= Mexican literature =

Literature written or related to Mexico

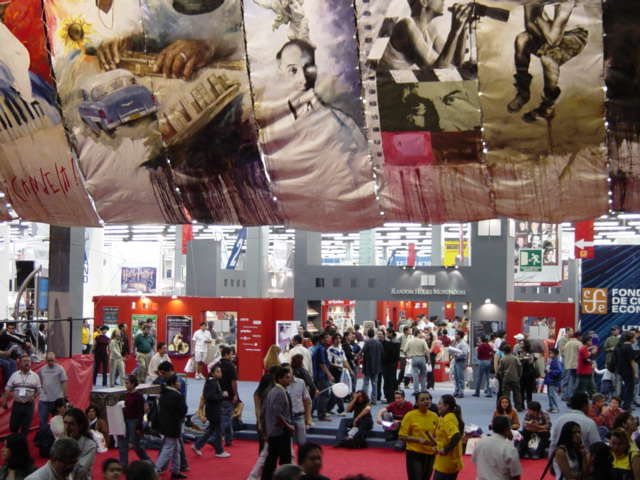
Main entrance of the Guadalajara International Book Fair 2002. The largest book fair of the Americas, and first largest book display in Mexico after Frankfurt's.

Mexican literature is one of the most prolific and influential of Spanish-language literatures along with those of Spain and Argentina. Found among the names of its most important and internationally recognized literary figures are authors Octavio Paz, Alfonso Reyes, Carlos Fuentes, Sergio Pitol, José Emilio Pacheco, Rosario Castellanos, Fernando del Paso, Juan Rulfo, Amado Nervo, Sor Juana Inés de la Cruz, Ramón López Velarde, and Carlos de Sigüenza y Góngora, among others.

== Introduction ==
Mexico has the second most Miguel de Cervantes Prize, the most prestigious literary award in the Spanish language.

Mexico's literature has its antecedents in the literatures of the indigenous peoples of Mesoamerica and the literary traditions of Spain. With the arrival of the Spanish, a new literature was produced through mestizaje, which made way for a period of creolization of literature in the newly established Viceroyalty of New Spain. The literature of New Spain was highly influenced by the Spanish Renaissance, which was represented in all the Spanish literature of the time, and local productions also incorporated numerous terms commonly used in the vernacular of the viceroyalty and some of the topics discussed in the works of the period shaped a distinctive variant of the Spanish literature produced in Mexico.

During the colonial era, New Spain was home to Baroque writers such as Bernardo de Balbuena, Carlos de Sigüenza y Góngora, Juan Ruiz de Alarcón, Francisco de Castro, Luis Sandoval Zapata, Sor Juana Inés de la Cruz, Diego de Ribera and Rafael Landivar. Towards independence a new wave of writers gave the initial struggle for the emancipation of national literature from the literature of the Spanish peninsula: Diego José Abad, Francisco Javier Alegre and Friar Servando Teresa de Mier.

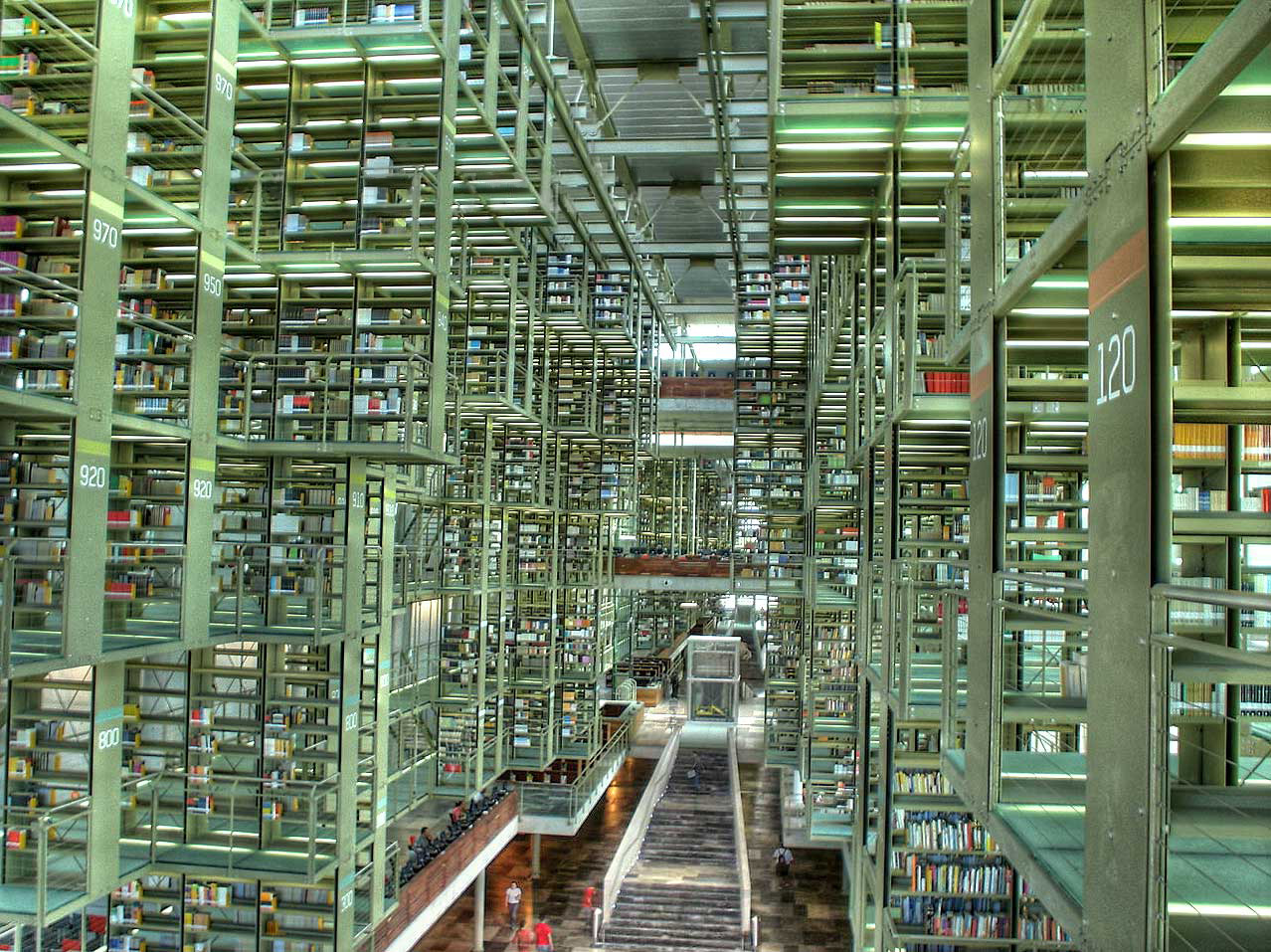
the interior of the José Vasconcelos Library.

Towards the end of colonial rule in New Spain arose figures like José Joaquín Fernández de Lizardi, El Periquillo Sarniento is considered as an emblem of the Mexican literature and the first modern novel written in the Americas. By the second half of that century, works like Los mexicanos pintados por sí mismos, a manners book that gives a rough idea of how intellectuals of the time saw the rest of his countrymen. Towards the end of the century, during the Porfirio Diaz government, Mexican writers inclined towards the dominant European trends of the time.

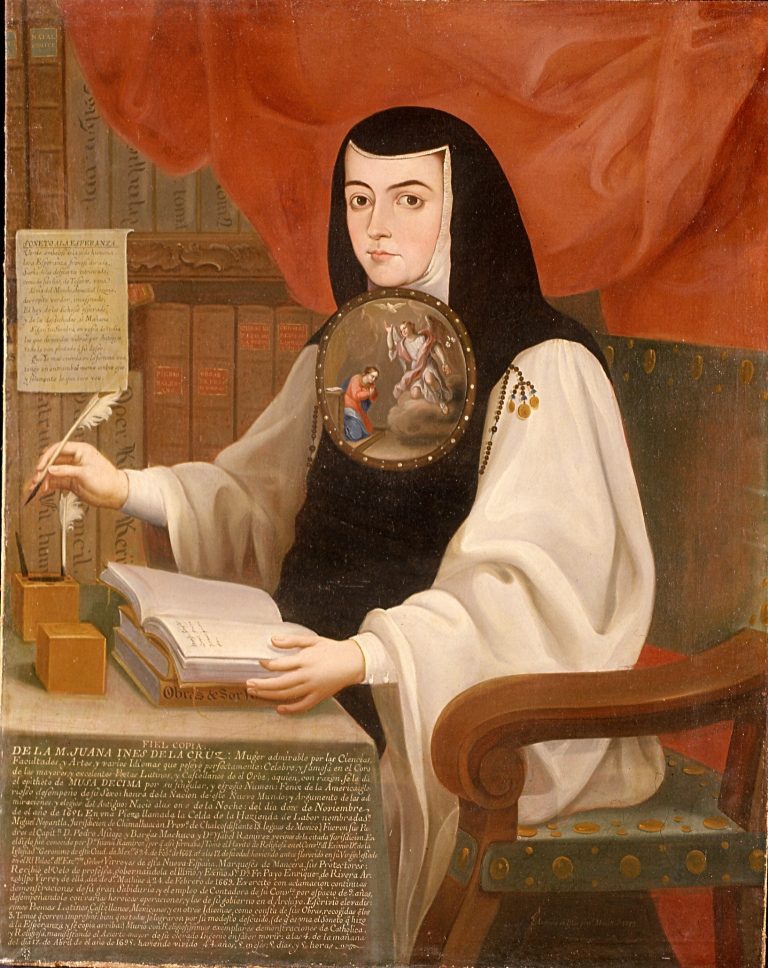
Sor Juana, in 1772 by Andrés d'Islles (Museum of the Americas, Madrid). Her outspoken opinions granted her lifelong names such as, "The Tenth Muse", "The Phoenix of America", or the "Mexican Phoenix".

To celebrate the centenary of the Independence of Mexico, there was a literary project surged Antología del Centenario which aimed to collect authors of the first hundred years of Mexico. This was truncated and only the first volume was published in two volumes primarily consisting of collected poetry. The poets of the time that were included were Friar Manuel de Navarrete, Fernando Calderón, Ignacio Rodríguez Galván. Notable modernists of the time included Amado Nervo and Manuel Gutiérrez Nájera. Other notable authors of that time were Luis G. Urbina, Efren Rebolledo, José Juan Tablada, Enrique González Martínez and Ramón López Velarde.

The emergence of the Mexican Revolution favored the development of journalistic genre. After the civil conflict finished, the Revolution theme appeared as a theme in many novels, short stories and plays like those of Mariano Azuela or Rodolfo Usigli. This trend would be an antecedent for the flowering of 'revolutionary literature', which was embodied in the work of writers like Rosario Castellanos or Juan Rulfo. A literature of indigenous themes, which aimed to portray the thoughts and life of the indigenous peoples of Mexico surged along with this revolutionary literature, although ironically, none of the writers were indigenous. The most notable indigenist authors of the time included Miguel Angel Menendez Reyes, Ricardo Pozas and Francisco Rojas González.

In alternative to these mainstream literature, also other literary styles were developed in the country, less known movements being outside the main focus. Among them, the estridentistas (1920s) that included authors such as Arqueles Vela and Manuel Maples Arce. Another relevant movement to the literary history of the country was a group of intellectuals known as Los Contemporáneos (1930s), which unified figures such as journalist Salvador Novo and poets like Xavier Villaurrutia and José Gorostiza.

During the second half of 20th century, Mexican literature had diversified into themes, styles and genres. There were new groups such as Literatura de la Onda (1960s), which sought for an urban, satirical and rebellious literature; among the featured authors were Parmenides García Saldaña and José Agustín; another literary style surged called Infrarrealismo (1970s), which sought to "blow his brains out the official culture"; La mafia cultural (1960s), was composed of Carlos Fuentes, Salvador Elizondo, José Emilio Pacheco, Carlos Monsivais, Inés Arredondo, Fernando Benítez among others. In 1990, Octavio Paz became the only Mexican to date to have won the Nobel Prize for Literature.

== Pre-Columbian literature ==
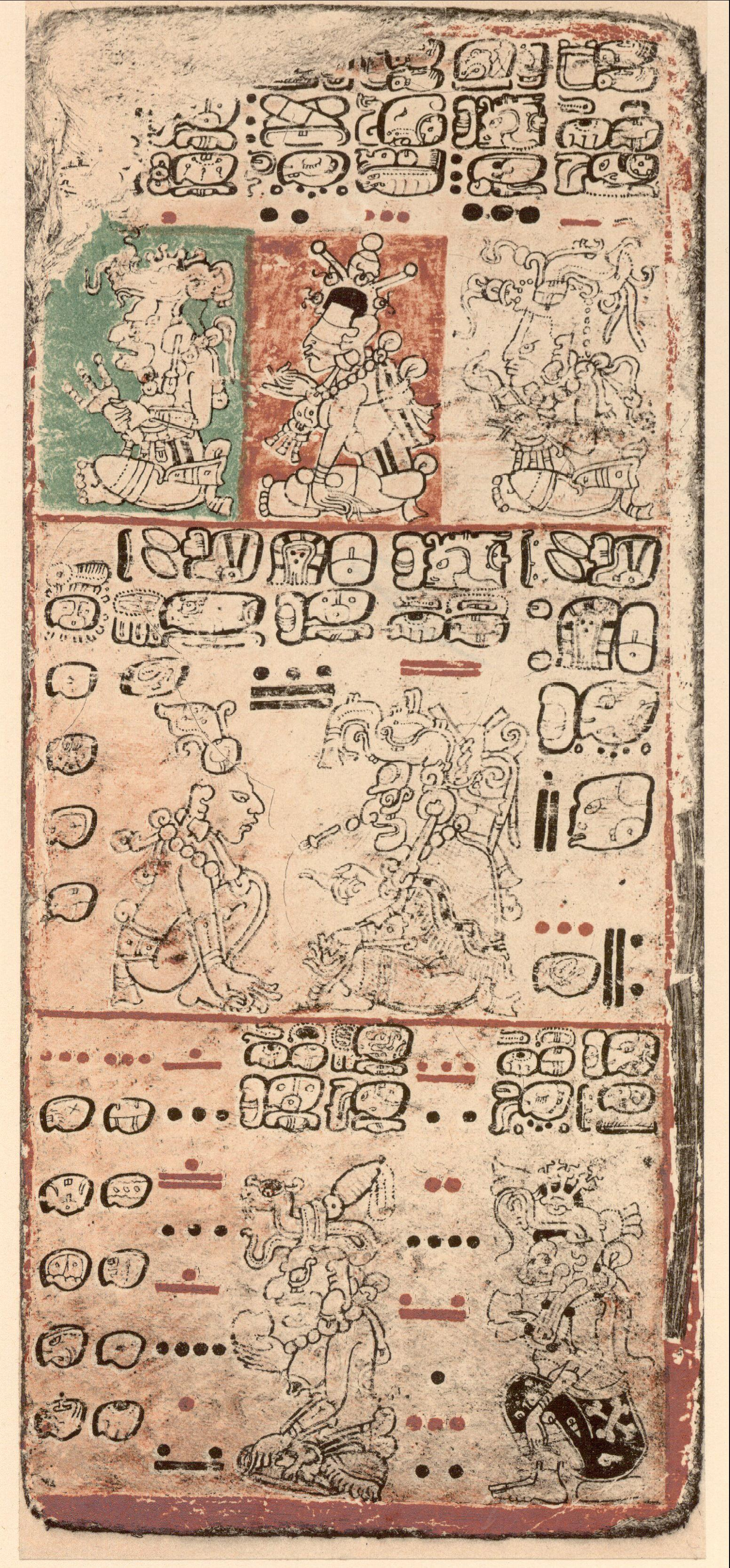
Page 9 of the Dresden Codex (from the 1880 Förstemann edition). It is located in the museum of the Saxon State Library Dresden, Germany.

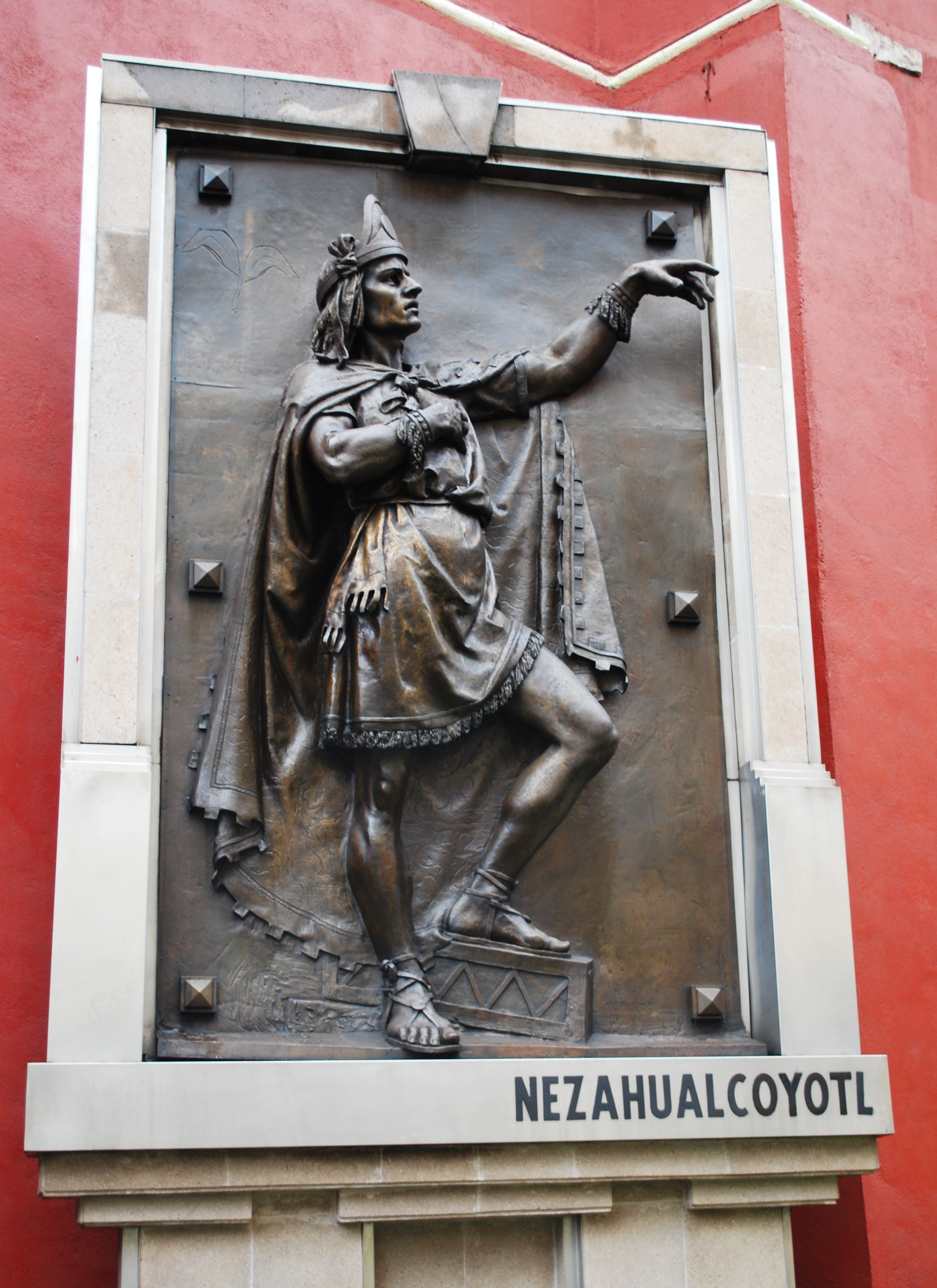
Nezahualcoyotl, who was revered as a sage and poet-king.

While the peoples of Mesoamerica developed systems of writing, these were not often used to preserve their literature. Most of the myths and literary works of the indigenous peoples of Mexico were transmitted by oral tradition. The peoples of Mesoamerica, despite having developed writing systems, primarily employed pictographic and logosyllabic forms rather than a phonetic writing system. Among these expressions, the Borgia Group codices are regarded by some scholars as exceptional artistic and literary works. While there is scholarly disagreement, it is commonly accepted that the central section of the Codex Borgia contains a narrative related to the creation of the universe, although an alternate hypothesis suggests that it may depict a series of rituals with an unclear purpose.

In addition to the Codex Borgia, the Mixtec codices Becker 1, Nutall, and Colombino depict the life of the hero-ruler 8-Venado and his efforts towards the unification of the Mixtec people. Another significant manuscript, the Boturini Codex or "Pilgrimage Strip," recounts chapters of the Mexicas' migration from northern Mexico to their eventual settlement in Texcoco Lake. However, it is worth noting that some scholars argue that the Boturini Codex is a copy of an older, unidentified document created during the early stages of the Conquest.

Within the cultural tapestry of ancient Mexico, a multitude of ceramic artifacts, stone carvings, stelae, and monoliths bear witness to historical, mythical-genealogical, cosmogonic, and legendary narratives. Notably, the Olmecs, Toltecs, Mayas, Nahua, and Mixtec peoples have produced a plethora of pieces that reflect their culutre.

The Olmecs, often credited as the originators of complex civilizations in Mesoamerica, are associated with the oldest known stone writing. Among their relics, a gravel block named 'Bloque de Cascajal' in Spanish is adorned with glyphs and has been carbon-dated to approximately 3,000 years ago, making it a significant archaeological find. This discovery sheds light on the early development of written communication in the region, highlighting the Olmecs' sophisticated cultural achievements.

We know that one of the activities that were to dominate the novices of priests among the Mexica was the memorization of lyrical works or mythology of their people.

Some of these productions were permanently fixed by writing them down using the Latin alphabet that the missionaries of the 16th century used to transcribe the information they received from the native inhabitants. Modern scholars such as Angel Maria Garibay K. and Miguel Leon-Portilla, have translated these works which were once dispersed in several texts and have reunited or reviewed these works in publications such as in "Visión de los vencidos. Relaciones indígenas de la Conquista" or "Historia de la literatura Náhuatl."

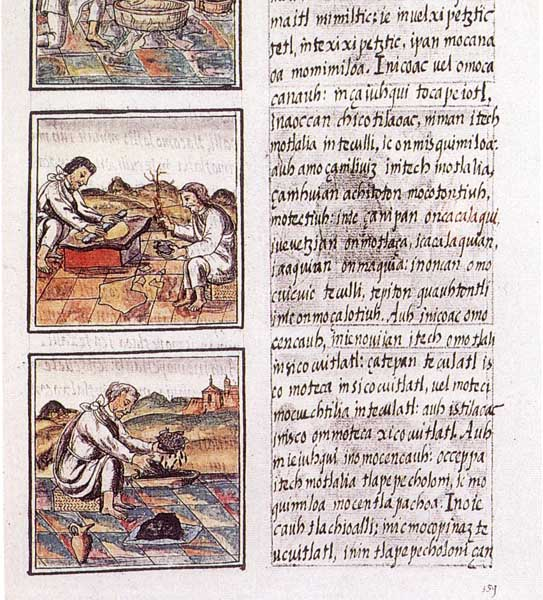
Page 51 of Book IX from the Florentine Codex. The text is in Nahuatl written with a Latin script.

The works of Spanish missionaries in central Mexico contributed to the preservation of the oral tradition of the Nahuatl speaking peoples by writing them down on paper using the Latin alphabet. In this regard the lyrical works of Acolmiztli Nezahualcoyotl (1402–1472), tlatoani of Texcoco, were preserved and passed down to posterity giving the author the title of Poet King. His works, along with other nobles of the nahuatlaca peoples of the Altiplano such as Ayocuan of Chalco-Atenco, and Tecayehuatzin of Huexotzinco, constitute the largest sample of pre-Columbian works and philosophical lyrics preserved into the modern era.

There are also smaller stocks of Postclassic Era literature recovered among other peoples such as the Purépecha, the Zapotec and Mixtec. The Case of the Mixtec is special as four codices have been preserved which have led to an approach to the study of the history of these people under the imprint of Eight Deer, Lord of Tututepec and Tilantongo. In the Mayan world there are preserved fragments called Books of Chilam Balam.

Another well known pre-Columbian literature is that of the Quiché people who did not inhabit the current Mexican territory, but rather, lived in what is now Guatemala. The Popol Vuh (Book of Counsel) was written in the Quiché language and incorporates two Mayan cosmogonical myths: the creation of the world and falling of Hunahpu and Xbalanque into Xibalba which is the underworld of the Maya.

Outside of Mesoamerica, Arturo Warman forwarded the hypothesis that the verses sung by the Yaquis and Mayo musicians during the performance of the Danza del Venado have their origin in pre-Columbian times and have survived to this day with very little change since then.

Among the prehispanic literature which flourished are:

- Epic Poetry which chronicles the life of famous people such as Topiltzin Quetzalcoatl, the founding of cities and pilgrimages of tribes.
- Lyric poetry of religious, military or philosophical context.
- Dramatic poetry, which mixed elements of music and dance, as the feast of Tezcatlipoca.
- Historical Prose and didactic genealogies, also proverbs called Huehuetlatolli ("The sayings of the old").

== Spanish colonial period ==
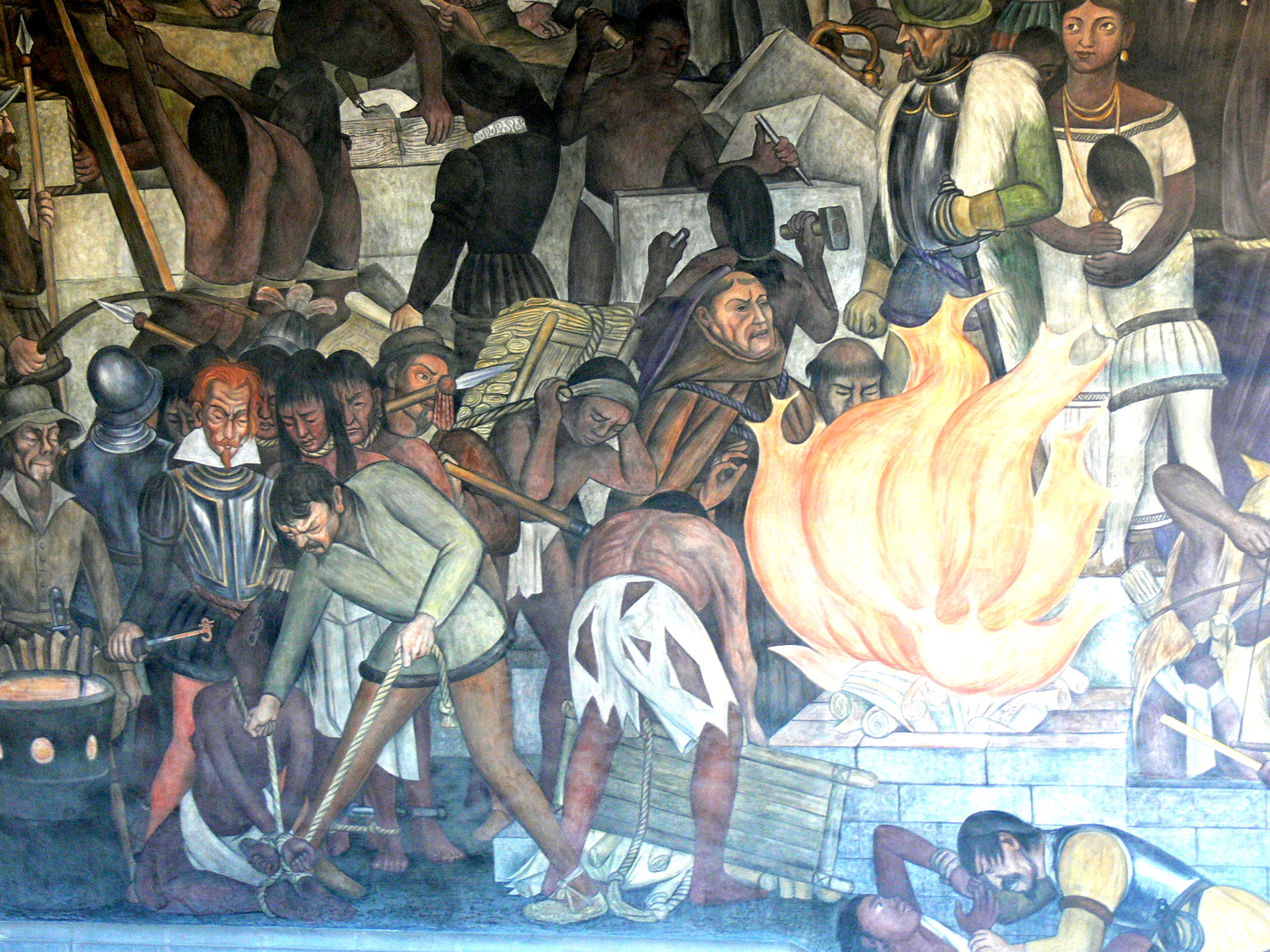
Mexico City - Palacio Nacional. Mural by Diego Rivera showing the History of Mexico: Detail showing the burning of Maya literature by the catholic church.

In the colonial literature of Mexico we can distinguish several periods. The first period is linked with the historical moment of conquest, it chronicles and letters abound.

=== 16th century ===
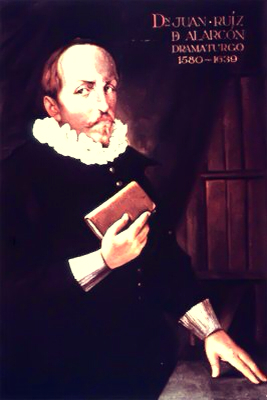
Juan Ruiz de Alarcón, one of the greatest Novohispanic dramatists of the Golden Age, was born in New Spain (modern Mexico).

The influence of indigenous themes in the literature of New Spain is evident in the incorporation of many terms commonly used in the common local tongue of the people in colonial Mexico as well as some of the topics touched in the works of the period which reflected local views and cultures. During this period, New Spain housed writers such as Bernardo de Balbuena.

In the colonial literature of Mexico we can distinguish several periods. The first examples of literature are linked with the historical moment of conquest, colonization chronicles and letters. Works and writers:

- Itinerario de la armada del rey católico a la isla de Yucatán[...], probably by Juan Díaz (1480–1549)
- Relación de algunas cosas de las que acaescieron a Hernan Cortés[...] by Andrés de Tapia (1498? -1561)
- Cartas de relación de Hernán Cortés (1485–1547)
- Historia verdadera de la conquista de la Nueva España by Bernal Diaz del Castillo (1492–1584)
- Historia general de las cosas de Nueva España Friar Bernardino de Sahagún (1499–1590)
- Historia de las Indias, Brevísima relación de la destrucción de las Indias, Apologética historia [...], etc. Friar Bartolomé de las Casas (1484–1566)
- Historia general de las Indias, La Conquista de México by Francisco Lopez de Gomara (1511–1566)
- Antigüedades de la Nueva España by Francisco Hernández (1517–1578)
- Relación de las cosas de Yucatán Friar Diego de Landa (1524–1579)
- Crónica mexicana y Crónica mexicáyotl by Fernando Alvarado Tezozómoc (c. 1525 – c. 1610)
- Historia de Tlaxcala by Diego Muñoz Camargo (c. 1530 – c. 1600)
- Historia Chichimeca by Fernando de Alva Cortés Ixtlilxóchitl (1568? -1648)
- Historia general de las Indias occidentales y particular de la gobernación de Chiapa y Guatemala by Friar Antonio de Remesal
- Francisco Cervantes de Salazar (1514? -1575). Born in Spain, was professor of rhetoric and then rector at the University of Mexico, author of Crónica de la Nueva España and poems such as Túmulo Imperial" y Diálogos latinos (following the example of Juan Luis Vives) of Mexican themes for the teaching of Latin.
- Gutierre de Cetina (1520 – c. 1567). Born in Spain, lived and died in Mexico. His poetry predates his stay in Mexico, but is very likely the existence of many plays of his authorship.
- Bernardo de Balbuena (1562–1627). Born in Spain, graduated from the University of Mexico, author of Grandeza mexicana (Mexican Greatness).
- Friar Luis de Fonsalida, author of "Diálogos o coloquios en lengua mexicana entre la Virgen María y el Arcángel San Gabriel".
- Friar Luis Cancer, author of "Varias canciones en verso zapoteco".
- Plácido Francisco, tepaneca prince, author of "Cánticos de las apariciones de la Virgen María".
- Andrés de Olmos, playwright author, "Representación de fin del mundo".
- Gaspar Perez de Villagra (1555–1620). Born in Puebla, participated in the conquest of New Mexico. Author of the poem Historia de la nueva México (1610) and several printed memorials.
- Francisco de Terrazas. First known poet born in New Spain.

=== 17th century ===
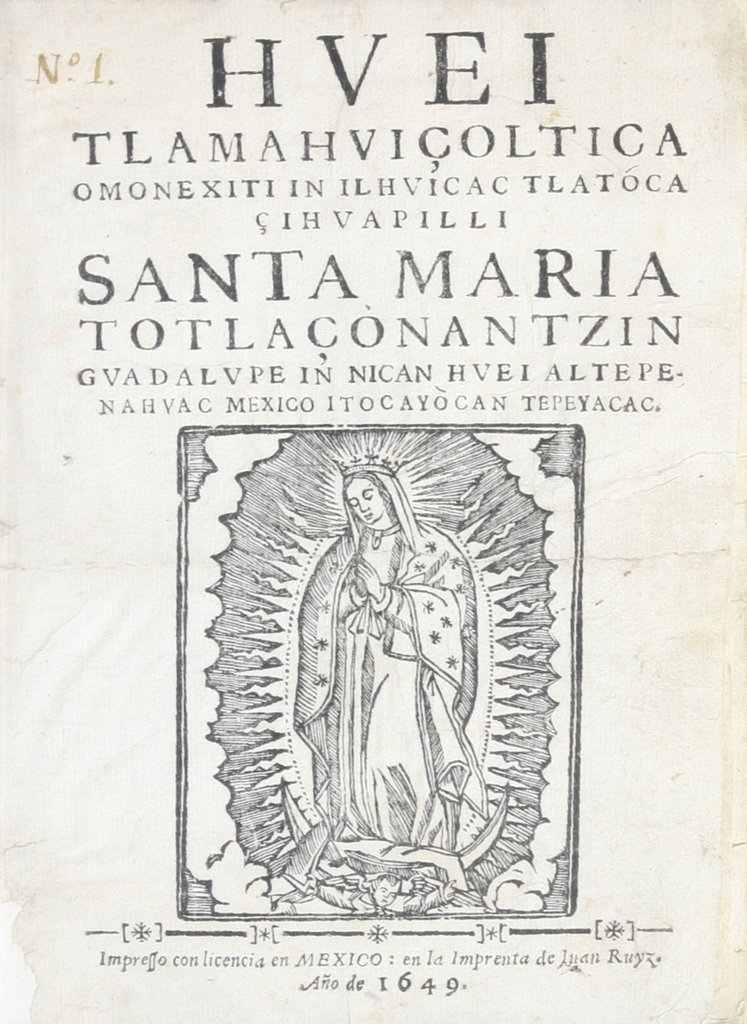
The first page of the Huei tlamahuiçoltica presently in the New York Public Library

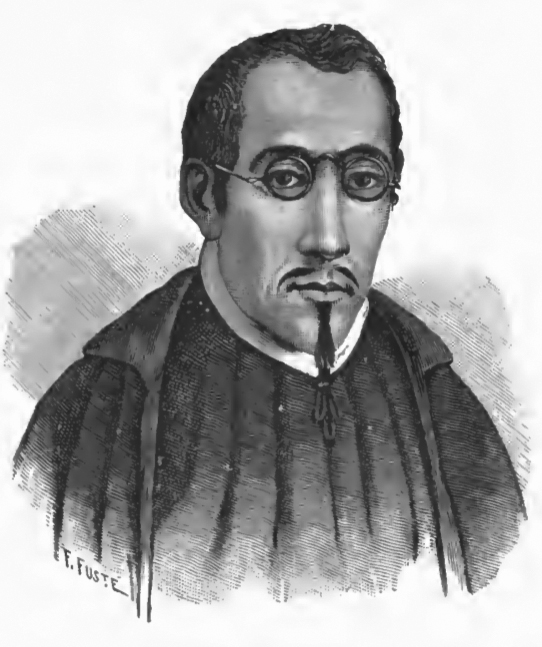
Carlos de Sigüenza y Góngora

In this period flourished particularly the Mexican variant of the Baroque literature. Many of the most famous authors of the century reached varying success in the area of literary games, with works like anagrams, emblems and mazes. There were notable authors in poetry, lyric, narrative and drama. The Baroque literature in New Spain followed the rivers of Spanish writers Góngora and Quevedo. Carlos de Sigüenza y Góngora, Juan Ruiz de Alarcón, Sor Juana Inés de la Cruz and Diego de Ribera were major exponents of the Mexican literature of this period.

The most notable authors:

- Arias Villalobos. He wrote "Historia de México en verso castellano", a narrative poetry.
- Bernardino de Llanos. Born in Spain, was known for his plays and literary whims.
- Diego de Ribera. A descriptive poetry writer of nature and art.
- Juan Ortiz de Torres and Jerome Becerra. Playwrights.
- José López Avilés. He wrote "Payo Enríquez", a biography in verse.
- Matías Bocanegra, author of "Canción la vista de un desengaño".
- María Estrada Medinilla and Sister Teresa de Cristo, verse reciters in civil and religious ceremonies.
- Fernando de Córdoba y Bocanegra (1565–1589). He was born in Mexico city and died in Puebla. He wrote Canción al amor divino and Canción al santísimo nombre de Jesús.
- Juan de Guevara, born in Mexico, was an acclaimed lyric poet.
- Juan Ruiz de Alarcón (1581–1639).
- Sor Juana Inés de la Cruz (1651–1695).
- Miguel de Guevara (c. 1586 – after 1646). Augustinian friar from Michoacan, with knowledge of 'Indigenous language'. A manuscript of him dating back 1638 includes, among other poems, sonnets such as No me mueve mi Dios para quererte....
- Antonio de Saavedra Guzman (? -¿? Published in 1599). Author of the poem El peregrino indiano, a praise of Hernán Cortés.
- Carlos de Sigüenza y Góngora (1645–1700).
- Francisco de Terrazas (? - ?, he was alive between 1525 and 1600). Born Mexico, close to Cortés, his works were praised by Miguel de Cervantes, as in La Galatea. Fragments of his poem Conquista y Mundo Nuevo are preserved.

=== 18th century ===
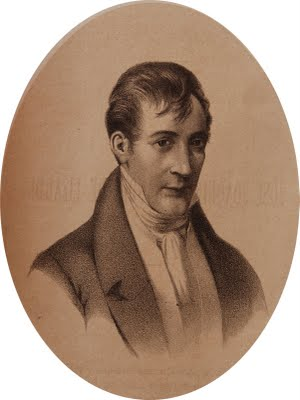
José Joaquín Fernández de Lizardi.

Towards the end of the colonial period emerged important figures such as José Joaquín Fernández de Lizardi, whose El Periquillo Sarniento, is considered emblematic of Mexican picaresque alongside other of his novels such as La Quijotita y su Prima and Don Catrín dela Fachenda represented the first novels written in the Americas.

Illustrated writers and classicists included:

- Diego José Abad (1727–1779)
- Francisco Javier Alegre (1729–1788)
- Francisco Javier Clavijero (1731–1787)
- Rafael Landivar (1731–1793)
- José Mariano Beristain (1756–1817)
- José Joaquín Fernández de Lizardi (1776–1827) also known as "The Mexican thinker"
- Friar Servando Teresa de Mier (1765–1827)

== Writers of independent Mexico (19th century) ==
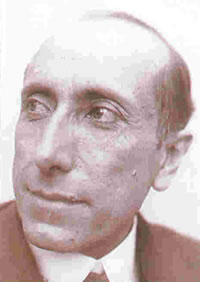
Amado Nervo

Due to the political instability of the 19th century, Mexico—already an independent nation—saw a decline not only in its literature but in the other arts as well. During the second half of the 19th century, Mexican literature became revitalized with works such as Los Mexicanos Pintados Por Si Mismos, a book that gives us an approximate idea of how intellectuals of the period saw their contemporaries. Towards the end of the century Mexican writers adopted the common tendencies of the period. Two modernist poets that stand out are Amado Nervo and Manuel Gutiérrez Nájera.

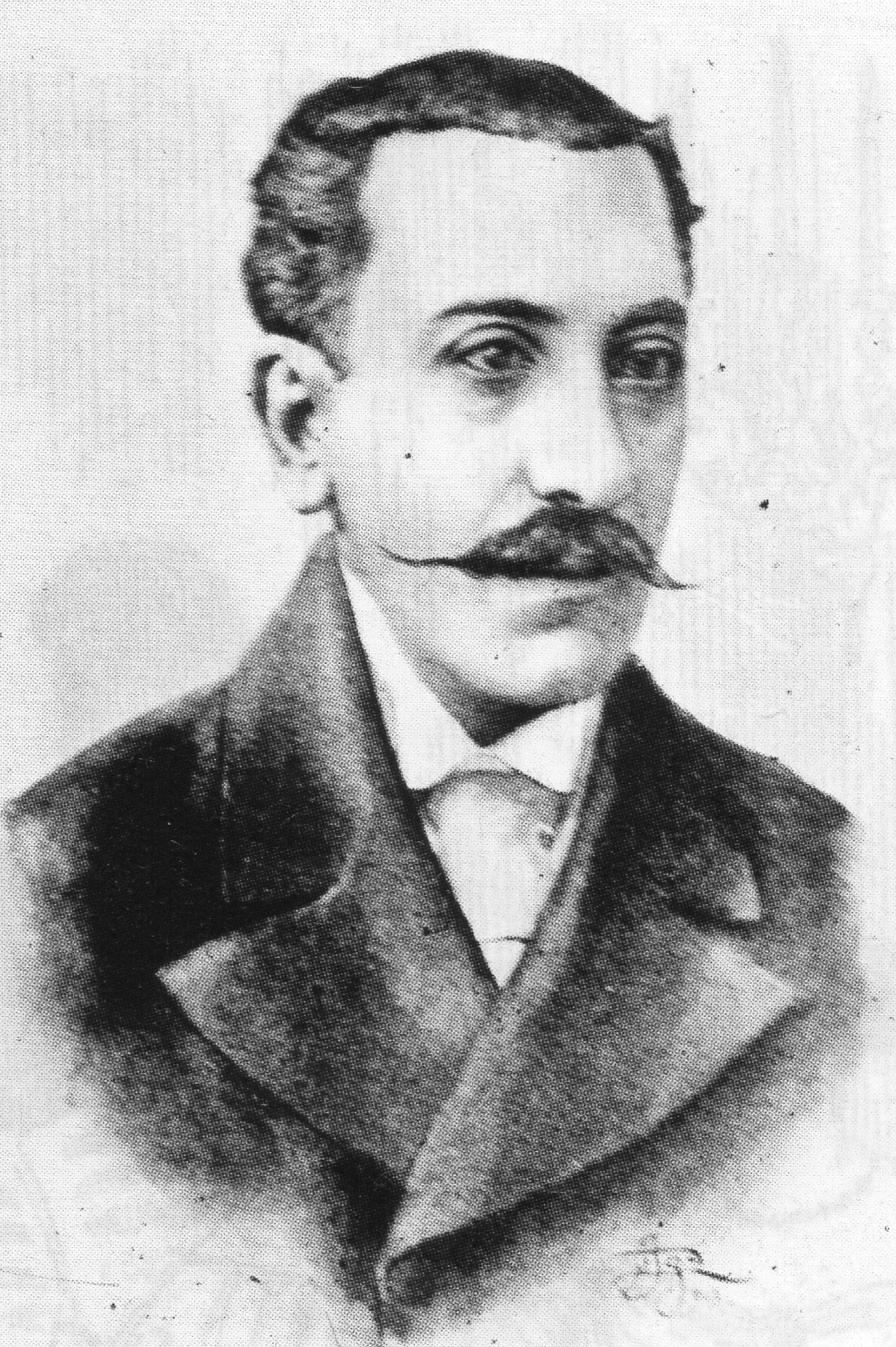
Manuel Gutiérrez Nájera

During the 19th century there were three major literary trends: romanticism, realism-naturalism and modernism.

Romantic writers gathered around hundreds of associations; among the most important the Academy Lateran, founded in 1836 (José María Lacunza, Guillermo Prieto, Manuel Carpio, Andrés Quintana Roo, José Joaquín Pesado, Ignacio Rodríguez Galván (Ignacio Ramirez). Liceo Hidalgo, was another prominent literary association founded in 1850, (Ignacio Manuel Altamirano, Manuel Acuña, Manuel M. Flores). Unto whom it was labeled as neo-classical or academic, as opposed to the category of "romantic" that was given to the former authors. Other authors belong to this group such as José Manuel Martínez de Navarrete, Vicente Riva Palacio, Joaquin Arcadio Caspian, Justo Sierra and Manuel Jose Othon.

Later, during the rise of positivism aesthetic taste changed. Between realists and naturalists Mexican writers were Luis G. Inclán, Rafael Delgado, Emilio Rabasa, José Tomás de Cuéllar, Federico Gamboa and Ángel de Campo.

Within the modernist superman, original literary revolution in Latin America, there were numerous metrics and rhyming innovations, revival of obsolete forms and mainly symbolic findings. Between 1895 and 1910 Mexico became a core of modernist activity; among famous writers there were Manuel Gutiérrez Nájera, Enrique González Martínez, Salvador Díaz Mirón and Amado Nervo.

=== Essayists ===
- Lucas Alamán (1792–1853)
- Serapio Baqueiro Barrera (1865–1940)
- Manuel Gutiérrez Nájera (1859–1895).
- Antonio Menendez de la Peña (1844–1912).
- Rodolfo Menéndez de la Peña (1850–1928).
- Justo Sierra Méndez (1848–1912).
- José Vasconcelos (1882–1959).

=== Novelists and short story writers ===
- Ignacio Manuel Altamirano (1834–1893).
- Angel del Campo (1868–1908).
- Florencio María del Castillo (1828–1863).
- José Tomás de Cuellar (1830–1894).
- Rafael Delgado (1853–1914).
- Federico Gamboa (1864–1939).
- Gregorio López y Fuentes (1897–1966).
- Manuel Payno (1810–1894).
- Guillermo Prieto (1818–1897).
- Vicente Riva Palacio (1832–1896)
- José Rubén Romero (1890–1952).
- Victoriano Salado Alvarez (1867–1931).
- Justo Sierra O'Reilly (1814–1861).
- Francisco Javier Moreno (1895–1961).

=== Poets ===
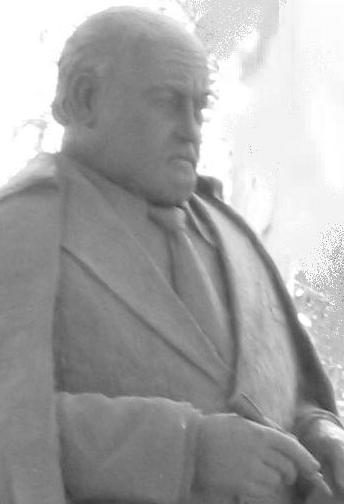
Alfonso Reyes was nominated for the Nobel Prize in Literature five times.

- Manuel Acuña (1849–1873).
- Manuel Carpio (1791–1860).
- Salvador Díaz Mirón (1853–1928).
- Enrique González Martínez (1871–1952).
- Enrique González Red (1899–1939).
- Manuel Gutiérrez Nájera (1858–1895).
- Renato Leduc (1898–1986).
- Rafael Lopez (1873–1943).
- Ramón López Velarde (1888–1921).
- Amado Nervo (1870–1919).
- Manuel Jose Othon (1858–1906).
- Juan de Dios Peza (1852–1910).
- Efren Rebolledo (1877–1929).
- Alfonso Reyes (1889–1959).
- José Juan Tablada (1871–1945).
- Luis G. Urbina (1864–1934).
- Granade Miriam (1995)
- Arianna Alvarez (2001)

== Contemporary Writers (20th and 21st centuries) ==
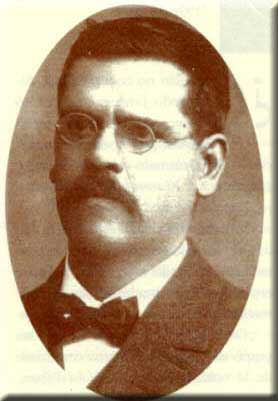
Mariano Azuela

=== 1900–1955 ===
The inception of the Mexican Revolution favored the growth of the journalistic genre. Once the civil conflict ended, the theme of the Revolution appeared as a theme in novels, stories and plays by Mariano Azuela and Rodolfo Usigli. This tendency would anticipate the flowering of a nationalist literature, which took shape in the works of writers such as Rosario Castellanos and Juan Rulfo. There also appeared on the scene an "indigenous literature," which purported to depict the life and thought of the indigenous peoples of Mexico, although, ironically, none of the authors of this movement were indigenous. Among them Ricardo Pozas and Francisco Rojas Gonzalez stand out.

There also developed less mainstream movements such as that of the "Estridentistas", with figures that include Arqueles Vela and Manuel Maples Arce (1920s). Other literary movements include that of Los Contemporáneos, which was represented by writers like Salvador Novo, Xavier Villaurrutia and José Gorostiza. Towards the end of the 20th century Mexican literature had become diversified in themes, styles and genres. In 1990 Octavio Paz became the first Mexican—and up until this point the only one—to win the Nobel Prize for Literature.

In the years between 1900 and 1914 it continued to dominate modernism in poetry and prose realism and naturalism. During this period lived representatives 19th-century literature with members of the Ateneo´s youth.

From 1915 to 1930 there were three streams: a stylistic renewal incorporating influences from the European vanguard (the estridentismo (Manuel Maples Arce, German List Arzubide, Arqueles Vela) and Contemporaries), a group of writers resumed colonial subjects (Xavier Villaurrutia, Jaime Torres Bodet, Jorge Cuesta, José Gorostiza, Salvador Novo), and others who began publishing calls "novels of the Revolution "(the best known is the Underdogs of Mariano Azuela): Martin Luis Guzman, Rafael Muñoz, Heriberto Frías, Jorge Ferretis, Nellie Campobello.

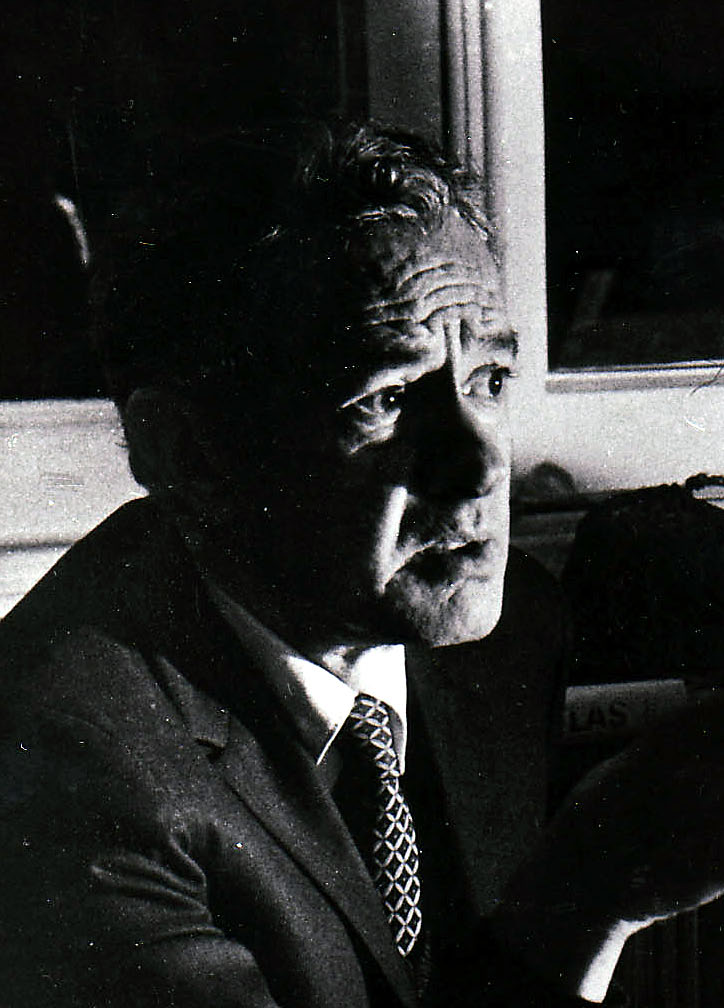
Juan Rulfo

Until the mid-1940s there were authors who continued realistic narrative, but also reached their peak the indigenista novel and reflections involved around on self and national culture. Emerged two new poetic generations, grouped around the magazines Taller y Tierra Nueva.

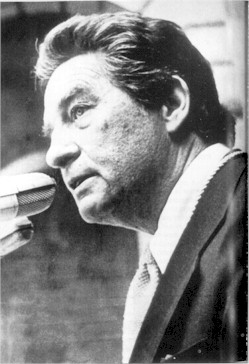
Octavio Paz

With the publication of Agustín Yáñez's Al filo del agua in 1947 began what we call "contemporary Mexican novel" incorporating innovative techniques, influences of American writers such as (William Faulkner and John Dos Passos), and European influences from (James Joyce and Franz Kafka), and in 1963, the hitherto known for his articles in newspapers and magazines and its beautiful theater Elena Garro, published which became the initiator of the boom Latin American and founder of the genre known as "magical realism": the novel Recollections of Things to Come , which inspired the Colombian Gabriel García Márquez to write his most celebrated One Hundred Years of Solitude. While during the period from 1947 to 1961 predominated the narrators (Arreola, Rulfo, Fuentes), then emerged poets worth as Rubén Bonifaz Nuño and Rosario Castellanos (also narrator).

=== The Lake House Generation ===
Like his colleagues of the Rupture movement (Spanish: Ruptura), the writers associated with the Lake House Generation (Spanish: Generación de la Casa del Lago) or the Mexican Literature Review generation (Spanish: Revista Mexicana de Literatura) sought to move away from nationalist sentiment and indigenist literature toward a more universal literary expression. Their principal influences included earlier Mexican intellectual movements that had also promoted broader artistic perspectives, such as the Ateneo de la Juventud (Athenaeum of Youth), contemporary authors, and the so-called Workshop Generation (Spanish: Generación Taller).

There is no precise date that can be defined as the beginning of this movement; however, 1956 was a crucial year for this group of artists, as it marked the publication of Octavio Paz's essay The Bow and the Lyre (Spanish: El arco y la lira), which addressed the nature of writing, poetry, and the novel, as well as the mystical vocation of literature and the sacred and mysterious dimensions of art. This work was highly influential for the writers of the Lake House Generation, as it helped define the qualities they sought to convey in their own works.

José Emilio Pacheco considered 1958 another key year for these intellectuals, marked by the publication of Carlos Fuentes' novel Where the Air Is Clear (Spanish: La región más transparente), widely regarded as the first formal urban novel in Mexican literature.

A factor that contributed to the cohesion of the authors associated with this movement was their participation in various cultural institutions, supported by Jaime García Terrés, who served as Director of Cultural Diffusion at the National Autonomous University of Mexico from 1953 to 1965.

The consolidation of this generation was closely linked to the founding of the Casa del Lago in Chapultepec Park in Mexico City. Its first director, Juan José Arreola, brought together a group of artists who significantly reshaped the cultural landscape of the period. Within this space, experimentation flourished, dominant artistic forms across disciplines were challenged, and new boundaries were explored. The university venue in Chapultepec thus became a key reference point for emerging art and a center for engagement with international artistic developments.

=== 1960–present ===
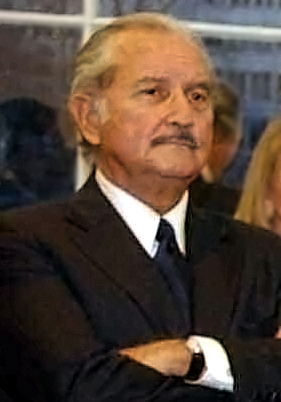
Carlos Fuentes

In 1960 an anthology was edited La espiga amotinada, which brought together the major group of poets: Juan Banuelos, Oscar Oliva, Jaime Augusto Shelley, Eraclius Zepeda and Jaime Labastida. Literary magazines were one of the main vehicles for disseminating the writers, so they tend to group many of them under the name of the journals in which they were active. The Prodigal Son was directed by Xavier Villaurrutia, the group Los Contemporaneos who had Octavio Paz as a coolaborador. Octavio Paz, after leaving founded the newspaper Excelsior, a magazine called Vuelta, which led for many years the national culture, mainly after the death of Martin Luis Guzman in 1976.

After the death of Octavio Paz, a group of his contributors tried to start a magazine, but the fledgling magazine, Letras libres, failed to have the acceptance of Vuelta. In 1979, Gabriel Zaid made a census of poets published in his anthology Assembly of young poets of Mexico; among those who were included, there were poets as Eduardo Hurtado, Alberto Blanco, Coral Bracho, Eduardo Casar, Eduardo Langagne, Manuel Ulacia, Vicente Quirarte, Victor Manuel Mendiola, Dante Medina, Veronica Volkow, Pearl Schwartz, Jaime Moreno Villarreal and Francisco Segovia. These and the other authors included are those who currently make up the group of authors at the peak of his literary career. Most worked in Vuelta. Present-day notable Mexican poets include Elsa Cross and Efraín Bartolomé.

Influenced by the mass media, social networks, and the Internet, the generation born in the 80s and 90s exhibits a strong inclination towards literature, which finds expression in various digital and print media platforms, such as blogs, internet pages, digital and printed magazines, and electronic books. The impact of this generation on the literary landscape is still challenging to trace. Nonetheless, their presence is evident through the emergence of literary creation schools established in recent decades, including Universidad del Claustro de Sor Juana (UCSJ), Casa Lamm, Centro Morelense de las Artes (CMA), Sociedad General de Escritores de México (Sogem), and Escuela Mexicana de Escritores (EME).

Within this generation of young writers, certain individuals have garnered attention for their literary contributions. Among them are Fernanda Melchor, Mercedes Alvarado, Martín Rangel, Aldo Vicencio, Davo Valdez, Iván Cruz, Juan Andrés Herrera, Víctor Ibarra (known by their pseudonyms Genkidama Ñu and Vraiux Dorós), Tania Carrera, Joana Medellín Herrero, Tania Langarica, Itzel Nayelli Palacios, Andrea Chaves, Rojo Córdova, Yaxkin Melchy, Karlos Atl, and many others. While the full extent of their impact is yet to be determined, these individuals represent the active and visible facet of this generation of writers.

=== Essayists ===
- Jorge Cuesta (1903–1942)
- Germán Dehesa (1944–2010)
- Ricardo Garibay (1923–1999)
- Margo Glantz (1930–)
- Manuel Hernández Gómez (1950–)
- Hugo Hiriart (1942–)
- Carlos Monsivais (1938–2010)
- Octavio Paz (1914–1998)
- Óscar René Cruz Oliva (1933–)
- Sergio Pitol (1933–2018)
- Elena Poniatowska (1932–)
- Vicente Quirarte (1954–)
- Alfonso Reyes (1889–1959)
- Guillermo Samperio (1948–)
- Sara Sefchovich (1949–)
- Carlos J. Sierra (1933–)
- Gabriel Zaid (1934–)

=== Novelists and short story writers ===
- Abraham Nissan (1969–)
- Andres Acosta (1964–)
- José Agustín (1944–)
- Homero Aridjis (1940–)
- Inés Arredondo (1928–1989)
- Juan José Arreola (1918–2001)
- René Avilés Fabila (1940–)
- René Avilés Rojas (1911–1979)
- Mariano Azuela (1873–1952)
- Mario Bellatín (1960–)
- Carmen Boulton (1954–)
- Juan de la Cabada Vera (1901–1986)
- Nellie Campobello (1900–1986)
- Rosario Castellanos (1925–1974)
- José de la Colina (1934)
- Alberto Chimal (1970)
- Leonardo Da Jandra (1951–)
- Amparo Dávila (1928)
- Guadalupe Dueñas (1920–2002)
- Salvador Elizondo (1932–2006)
- Beatriz Mirror
- Laura Esquivel (1950–)
- William Fadanelli (1963–)
- J. M. Servin (1962)
- Bernardo Fernández
- Jorge Ferretis (1902–1962)
- Heriberto Frías (1870–1925)
- Carlos Fuentes (1928–2012)
- Sergio Galindo (1926-1993)
- Juan García Ponce (1932–2003)
- Parmenides García Saldaña (1944–1982)
- Jesus Gardea (1939–2000)
- Ricardo Garibay (1923–1999)
- Elena Garro (1916–1998)
- José Luis González (1926)
- Martin Luis Guzman (1887–1977)
- Andrés Henestrosa (1906–2008)
- Yuri Herrera (1970–)
- Jorge Ibargüengoitia (1928–1983)
- Xavier Icaza (1892–1969)
- Patricia Laurent Kullick (1962–)
- Monica Lavin (1955–)
- Alfredo Lèal (1985)
- Vicente Leñero (1933–2014)
- Valeria Luiselli (1983–)
- Mauricio Magdaleno (1906–1986)
- Ángeles Mastretta (1949–)
- Elmer Mendoza (1949–)
- Miguel Angel Menendez Reyes (1904–1982)
- Thomas Mojarro (1932)
- Rafael Muñoz (1899–1972)
- Gilberto Owen (1904–1952)
- José Emilio Pacheco (1939–2014)
- Fernando del Paso (1935–2018)
- Sergio Pitol (1933-2018)
- Gerardo Horacio Porcayo (1966–)
- Maria Luisa Puga (1944–2004)
- Rafael Ramírez Heredia (1942–2006)
- Cristina Rivera Garza (1964–)
- Sergio-Jesús Rodríguez (1967)
- Octavio Rodriguez Araujo (1941)
- José Revueltas (1914–1976)
- Martha Robles (1949–)
- Bernardo Ruiz (1953–)
- Juan Rulfo (1918–1986)
- Rafael Saavedra (1967–2013)
- Daniel Sada (1953–2011)
- Alberto Ruy Sanchez (1951)
- Gustavo Sainz (1940)
- Guillermo Samperio (1948–)
- Federico Schaffler
- Mauricio-José Schwarz (1955–)
- Enrique Serna (1959–)
- Jordi Soler (writer)|Jordi Soler (1963–)
- Gerardo de la Torre (1938)
- David Toscana (1961–)
- Juan Tovar (1941)
- Elman Trevizo (1981)
- Gabriel Trujillo
- Edmundo Valadés (1915–1994)
- Arqueles Vela (1899–1977)
- Xavier Velasco (1964–)
- Juan Pablo Villalobos (1973–)
- Juan Villoro (1956–)
- Josefina Vicens (1911–1988)
- Janitzio Villamar (1969–)
- Jorge Volpi (1968)
- Agustín Yáñez (1904–1980)
- José Luis Zárate (1966–)
- Eraclius Zepeda (1937)
- Gerardo Arana (1987–2012)

=== Poets ===
- Griselda Álvarez (1913–2009)
- Guadalupe Amor (1918–2000)
- Homero Aridjis (1940–)
- List Germán Arzubide (1898–1998)
- Juan Banuelos (1932–)
- Efraín Bartolomé (1950–)
- José Carlos Becerra (1936–1970)
- Abigael Bohórquez (1936–1995)
- Rubén Bonifaz Nuño (1923–2013)
- Andrés Castuera-Micher (1976)
- Alí Chumacero (1918– 2010)
- Óscar Cortés Tapia (1960–)
- Jorge Cuesta (1903–1942)
- Gerardo Deniz (1934–2014)
- José Gorostiza (1901–1973)
- Daniel Gutiérrez Pedreiro (1964–)
- Francisco Hernández (1946–)
- Efraín Huerta (1914–1982)
- David Huerta (1949–)
- Martín Jiménez Serrano (1967)
- Jaime Labastida (1939–)
- Ricardo López Méndez (1903–1989)
- Tedi López Mills (1959–)
- Manuel Maples Arce (1898–1981)
- Yaxkin Melchy Ramos (1985–)
- Carmen Mondragón "Nahui Olin" (1893–1978)
- Marco Antonio Montes de Oca (1932–2008)
- Oscar Oliva (1938–)
- José Emilio Pacheco (1939–2014)
- Helena Paz Garro, (1939–2014)
- Octavio Paz (1914–1998)
- Carlos Pellicer (1899–1977)
- Jaime Sabines (1926–1999)
- Jaime Augusto Shelley (1937)
- Javier Sicilia (1956–)
- Concha Urquiza (1910–1945)
- Xavier Villaurrutia (1903–1950)
- Eraclio Zepeda (1937–2015)

=== Playwrights ===
- Hugo Argüelles (1932–2003)
- Homer Aridjis (1940–)
- Luis G. Basurto (1920–1990)
- Sabina Berman (1955–)
- Emilio Carballido (1925–2008)
- Andrés Castuera-Micher (1976)
- Elena Garro (1916–1998)
- Ricardo Garibay (1923–1999)
- Miguel Ángel Tenorio (1954–1)
- Luisa Josefina Hernandez (1928–)
- Vicente Leñero (1933–2014)
- Oscar Liera (1946–1990)
- Carlos Olmos (1947–2003)
- José Lorenzo Canchola (1962–)
- Victor Hugo Rascon Banda (1948–2008)
- Guillermo Schmidhuber (1943–)
- Juan Tovar (1941–)
- Luis Mario Moncada (1963–)
- Rodolfo Usigli (1905–1980)
- Xavier Villaurrutia (1903–1950)

=== Historians ===
- Alfonso Junco
- Carlos Antonio Aguirre Rojas (1954–)
- Carlos Pereyra
- Carlos Alvear Acevedo
- Eduardo Blanquel
- Guillermo Bonfil Batalla (1935–1991)
- Victor Manuel Castillo Farreras (1932–)
- Daniel Cosio Villegas (1898–1976)
- Martha Fernandez
- Mariano Cuevas
- José Fuentes Mares (1918–1986)
- Adolfo Gilly
- Pilar Gonzalbo Aizpuru
- Lucas Alamán
- Luis González y González (1925–2003)
- Luis González Obregón
- Enrique Krauze (1947–)
- Miguel León-Portilla (1926–2019)
- Alfredo López Austin (1936–)
- Leonardo López Luján (1964–)
- Jorge Alberto Manrique
- Francisco Martin Moreno (1946–)
- Álvaro Matute Aguirre
- Margarita Menegus
- Alfonso Mendiola
- Jean Meyer (1942–)
- Lorenzo Meyer (1942–)
- Juan Miralles Ostos (1930–2011)
- Moguel Josefina Flores (1952–)
- Edmundo O'Gorman (1906–1995)
- Héctor Pérez Martínez (1906–1948)
- Constantino Reyes-Valerio (1922–2006)
- Antonio Rubial
- Rafael Tovar y de Teresa
- Guillermo Tovar y de Teresa
- Paco Ignacio Taibo II
- Cristina Pacheco Torales
- Elisa Vargas Lugo
- Bolívar Zapata
- José David Gamboa
- Vito Alessio Robles

== Chronology ==
¿Zan yuhqui nonyaz in compolihui xóchitl ah?
¿Antle notleyp yez in quenmanian?
¿Antle nitauhca yez in tlaltipac?

¡Ma nel xóchitl, ma nel cuícatl!
¿Quen conchihuas noyolo, yehuaya?
¡On nen toquizaco in tlaltipac!

I only have to leave similar to the flowers that were perishing?
Nothing will my glory ever be?
Nothing will my fame be on earth?

Even flowers, even songs!
Oh, what will my heart do?
In vain we come to pass on earth!

Tr. Ángel María Garibay K.

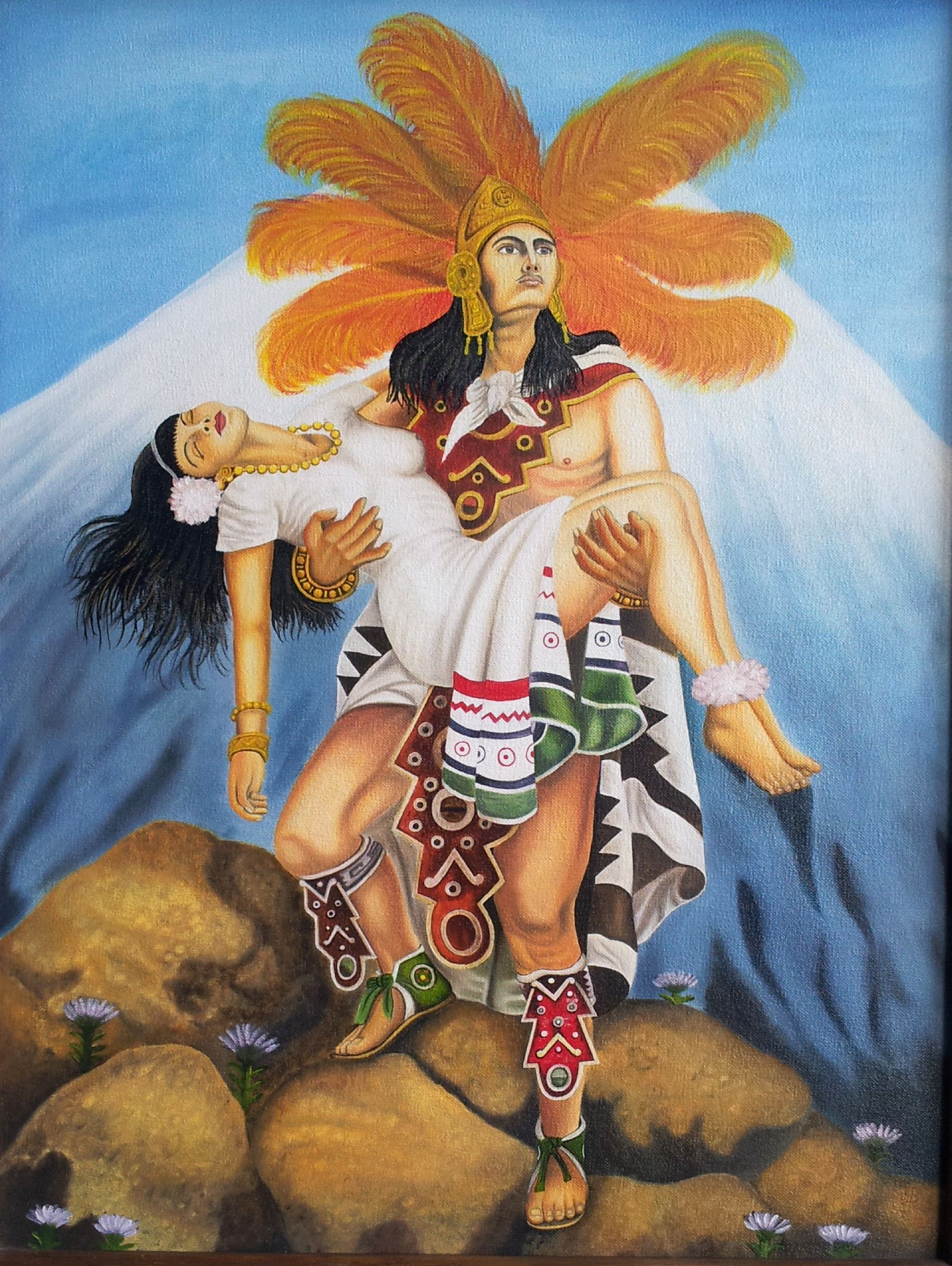
Replica of "Grandeza Azteca" (Aztec greatness) by painter Jesús Helguera, depicting the legend of Popocatepetl

Name	Date
Nezahualcóyotl	1402–1472
Juan Ruiz de Alarcón	1581–1639
Sor Juana Inés de la Cruz	1651–1695
José Joaquín Fernández de Lizardi	1776–1827
Ignacio Ramírez	1818–1879
Ignacio Manuel Altamirano	1834–1893
José Rosas Moreno	1838–1883
Manuel Acuña	1849–1873
Juan de Dios Peza	1852–1910
Salvador Díaz Mirón	1853–1928
Manuel Gutiérrez Nájera	1858–1895
Manuel José Othón	1858–1906
Luis Gonzaga Urbina	1864–1934
Federico Gamboa	1864–1939
Amado Nervo	1870–1919
Mariano Azuela	1873–1952
Alfonso Reyes	1889–1959
Bruno Traven	1890–1969
Carlos Pellicer	1899–1977
José Gorostiza	1901–1973
Xavier Villaurrutia	1903–1950
Agustín Yáñez	1904–1980
Salvador Novo	1904–1974
Francisco Tario	1911–1977
Octavio Paz	1914–1998

Name	Date
José Revueltas	1914–1976
Elena Garro	1917–1998
Alí Chumacero	1918
Juan José Arreola	1918–2001
Juan Rulfo	1918–1986
Guadalupe 'Pita' Amor	1918–2000
José Luis Martínez	1918–2007
Ricardo Garibay	1923–1999
Rosario Castellanos	1925–1974
Jaime Sabines	1926–1999
Tomás Segovia	1927
Jorge Ibargüengoitia	1928–1983
Inés Arredondo	1928–1989
Carlos Fuentes	1928–2012
Héctor Azar	1930–2000
Margo Glantz	1930
Salvador Elizondo	1932–2006
Elena Poniatowska	1932
Maruxa Vilalta	1932
Juan García Ponce	1932–2003
Vicente Leñero	1933
Sergio Pitol	1933
Gabriel Zaid	1934
Gerardo Deniz	1934
Fernando del Paso	1935

Name	Date
José Carlos Becerra	1937–1970
Francisco Cervantes	1938–2005
Carlos Monsiváis	1938–2010
José Emilio Pacheco	1939–2014
Jesús Gardea	1939–2000
Eduardo Lizalde	1939
Homero Aridjis	1940
Esther Seligson	1941
Héctor Aguilar Camín	1946
Guillermo Samperio	1948
Paco Ignacio Taibo II	1949
Angeles Mastretta	1949
Francisco Serrano	1949
Laura Esquivel	1950
Coral Bracho	1951
Jose Tlatelpas	1953
Carmen Boullosa	1954
Juan Villoro	1956
Fernando Nachón	1957
Araceli Ardón	1958
Mario Bellatin	1960
Cristina Rivera Garza	1964
Eloy Urroz	1968
Ignacio Padilla	1968

== National Prize for Arts and Sciences (Premio Nacional de Ciencias y Artes) awarded ==
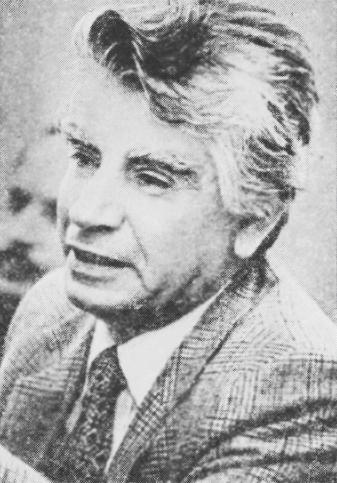
Leopoldo Zea

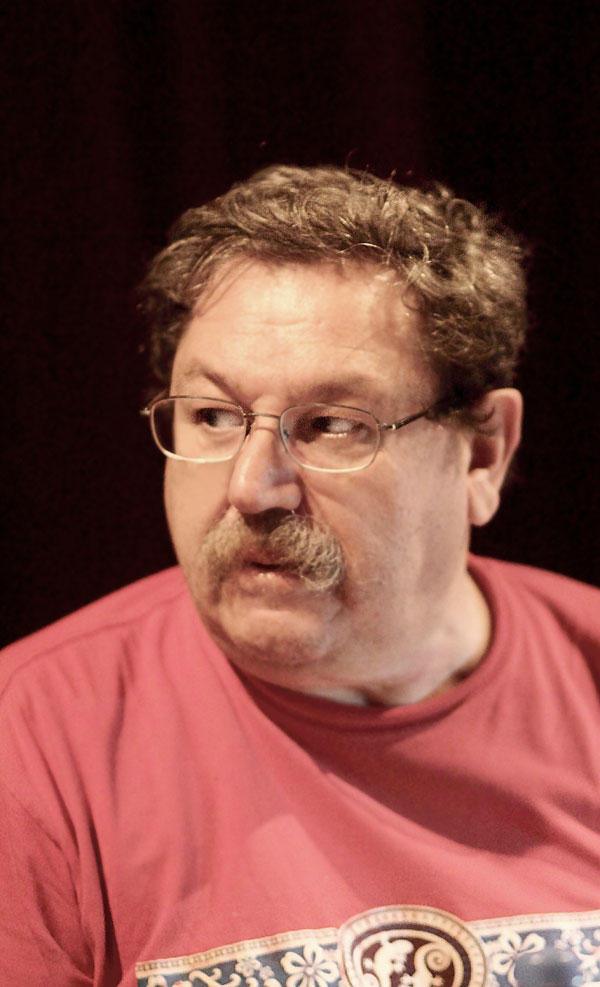
Paco Ignacio Taibo II

=== Linguistics and literature ===
Lingüística y Literatura

- 2014: Dolores Castro
- 2011: Daniel Sada
- 2010: Maruxa Vilalta
- 2005: Carlos Monsiváis
- 2004: Margo Glantz
- 2002: Elena Poniatowska
- 2001: Vicente Leñero
- 2000: Margit Frenk
- 1995: Juan Miguel Lope Blanch
- 1993: Sergio Pitol
- 1988: Eduardo Lizalde
- 1987: Alí Chumacero
- 1986: Rafael Solana
- 1985: Marco Antonio Montes de Oca
- 1984: Carlos Fuentes Macías
- 1983: Jaime Sabines
- 1982: Elías Nandino
- 1981: Mauricio Magdaleno
- 1980: José Luis Martínez Rodríguez
- 1979: Juan José Arreola
- 1978: Fernando Benítez
- 1977: Octavio Paz
- 1976: (Tie)
  - Antonio Gómez Robledo
  - Efraín Huerta
- 1975: Francisco Monterde
- 1974: Rubén Bonifaz Nuño
- 1973: Agustín Yáñez
- 1972: Rodolfo Usigli
- 1971: Daniel Cosío Villegas
- 1970: Juan Rulfo
- 1969: Silvio Zavala Vallado
- 1968: José Gorostiza
- 1967: Salvador Novo López
- 1966: Jaime Torres Bodet
- 1965: Ángel María Garibay
- 1964: Carlos Pellicer Cámara
- 1958: Martín Luis Guzmán
- 1949: Mariano Azuela González
- 1946: Alfonso Reyes
- 1935: Gregorio López y Fuentes

=== History, Social Sciences, and Philosophy ===
Historia, Ciencias Sociales y Filosofía

- 2007: Pilar Gonzalbo Aizpuru and Eduardo Matos Moctezuma
- 1997: Rodolfo Stavenhagen
- 1986: Luis Villoro Toranzo
- 1985: Alfonso Noriega Cantú
- 1984: Pablo González Casanova
- 1983: Luis González y González
- 1982: Héctor Fix Zamudio
- 1981: Miguel León-Portilla
- 1980: Leopoldo Zea Aguilar
- 1979: Gonzalo Aguirre Beltrán
- 1978: Mario de la Cueva
- 1977: Víctor L. Urquidi Bingham
- 1976: Eduardo García Máynez
- 1962: Jesús Silva Herzog
- 1960: Alfonso Caso

== Awards ==
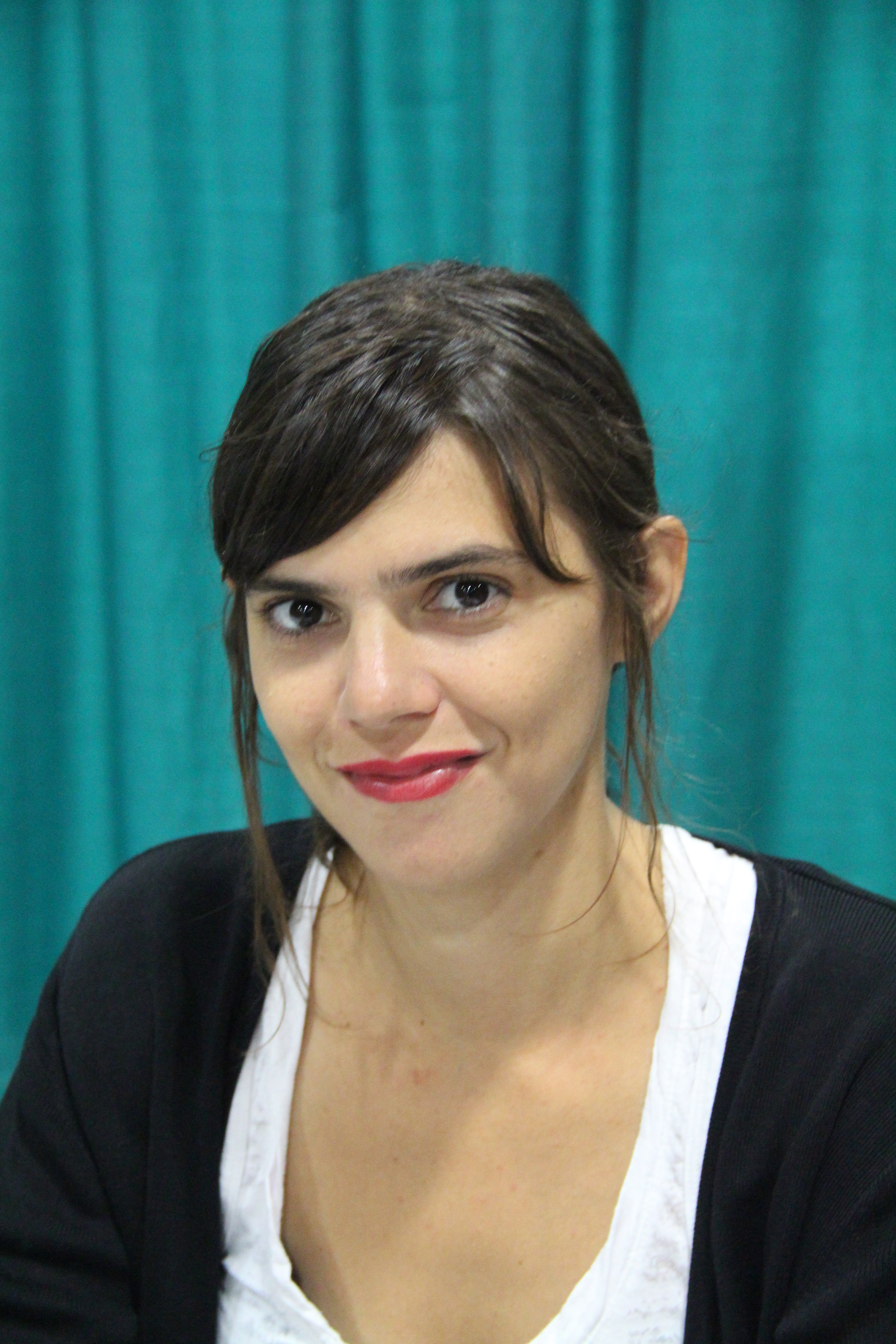
Valeria Luiselli in 2015

- Nobel Prize for Literature: Octavio Paz
- Miguel de Cervantes Prize: Octavio Paz, Carlos Fuentes, Sergio Pitol, José Emilio Pacheco, Elena Poniatowska, Fernando del Paso.
- Neustadt Prize: Octavio Paz, Carlos Fuentes (candidate), Homero Aridjis (candidate)
- Jerusalem Prize: Octavio Paz
- Alfonso Reyes Prize: Octavio Paz, Juan José Arreola, José Emilio Pacheco, Ali Chumacero, José Luis Martínez, Ramón Xirau, Rubén Bonifaz Nuño
- National Prize for Literature: Octavio Paz, Sergio Pitol, Juan Rulfo, Carlos Monsivais, Juan José Arreola, Margo Glantz, Elena Poniatowska, Ali Chumacero, Vicente Leñero, Mariano Azuela, Alfonso Reyes, Jaime Sabines, Maruxa Vilalta
- Menendez y Pelayo International Prize: Octavio Paz, Carlos Fuentes, José Luis Martínez
- Prince of Asturias Award: Carlos Fuentes, Juan Rulfo
- Guggenheim Fellowship: Sergio Pitol, Homero Aridjis, Juan García Ponce, Alfredo López Austin, Margo Glantz, Elena Poniatowska, Fernando del Paso, Vicente Leñero, Ramón Xirau, Rubén Bonifaz Nuño, Leonardo López Luján
- Romulo Gallegos Prize: Carlos Fuentes, Elena Poniatowska, Fernando del Paso, Ángeles Mastretta
- Federico Garcia Lorca Prize: José Emilio Pacheco
- Juan Rulfo Prize: Sergio Pitol, Carlos Monsiváis, Tomás Segovia, Juan José Arreola, Juan García Ponce
- Octavio Paz Prize: Tomás Segovia, José Emilio Pacheco

== See also ==
- List of Mexican writers
- List of Mexican poets
- Infrarealism
- Crack Movement
- List of libraries in Mexico
