= Francisco Monterde =

Mexican writer (1894–1985)

Francisco de Asís Monterde García Icazbalceta (August 9, 1894 in Mexico City – February 27, 1985 in Mexico City) was a prolific and multifaceted Mexican writer whose career spanned over fifty years. He was an important promoter of the arts and culture in Mexico in the years following the Revolution.

== Bibliography ==
His parents were Francisco de Asís Ángel María Monterde y Adalid and María Trinidad de los Dolores García Icazbalceta y Travesi de Monterde, aristocrats who both died when he was still young. He studied dentistry but never practiced. In 1924 he founded and edited the short-lived Mexican avant-garde cultural magazine Antena. In 1925 he famously deciphered a letter that conquistador Hernán Cortés left written in code. He wrote, in addition to plays and poetry, various novels set in colonial Mexico, a genre known as colonialista. In 1930 he created in conjunction with Alejandro Gómez Arias, the department of Mexican and Hispano-American Literature at the National Preparatory School. He was a founding member in 1938 of the Asociación Mexicana de Críticos de Teatro (AMCT). He belonged to the "grupo de los siete autores" (group of seven authors), a circle of dramatists active in the 1950s who revived the theatrical arts in Mexico. He was an admirer of José Juan Tablada and an imitator of the latter's haiku-inspired poetry (a style at the time referred to as haikai). He held important posts in the Ministry of Public Education. He was from 1922-65 a professor of Spanish and Latin-American literature at the Universidad Nacional Autónoma de México (UNAM), his alma mater (M.A. 1941, Ph.D. 1942). He served as subdirector of the Biblioteca Nacional de México; as head librarian of the Museo Nacional de Antropología e Historia (1931); and as director of the Imprenta Universitaria de la UNAM (UNAM University Press). He was director of the Centro Mexicano de Escritores from 1973-85.

Monterde was a numerary member (seat 2) of the Academia Mexicana de la Lengua and served as its director from 1960 to 1972.

== Awards ==
- Premio Nacional de Ciencias y Artes (1975)

== Published works ==
(list not comprehensive)

- Los virreyes de la Nueva España. Síntesis de la época colonial (1922)
- Itinerario contemplativo (1923)
- En el remolino: drama (1924)
- La hermana pobreza : novela mexicana inédita (1925)
- Manuel Gutierrez Nájera (1925)
- La que volvío a la vida (comedia en tres actos) (1926)
- Oro Negro (1927)
- Amado Nervo (1929)
- Antología de poetas y prosistas hispanoamericanos modernos (1931)
- Bibliografía del teatro en México (1933)
- Don Juan Ruiz de Alarcón (1939)
- Navarrete y sus Poesias profanas (1939)
- Guillermo Prieto y la "Musa callejera (1940)
- Algunos puntos oscuros en la vida de Salvador Díaz Mirón (1940)
- Fábulas sin moraleja y finales de cuentos (1942)
- El pensamiento de Bolívar (1943)
- Novelistas hispanoamericanos (del prerromanticismo a la iniciación del realismo) (1943)
- Proteo : fábula (1944)
- Cultura mexicana aspectos literarios (1946)
- Anales de los Xahil de los indios Cakchiqueles (other contributors: Georges Raynaud; Miguel Ángel Asturias; J. M. González de Mendoza; Francisco Hernández Arana Xajila; Francisco Díaz Gebuta Queh) (1946)
- Moctezuma: el de la silla de oro (1947)
- Chapultepec: poema (1947)
- La careta de cristal: comedia en tres actos (1948)
- Tres comedias : Apostolado en las Indias y martirio de un cacique, Si el amor excede al arte, ni amor ni arte a la prudencia, La pérdida de España (Eusebio Vela; Jefferson Rea Spell; Francisco Monterde) (1948)
- Una evasión romántica de Fernando Calderón : [discurso de recepción como académico de número en la Academia Mexicana] (1952)
- Dos comedias Mexicanas (1953)
- Teatro indígena prehispánico (Rabinal Achí) (1955) (editor)
- Teatro mexicano del siglo XX (1956) (co-written with Manuel José Othón)
- Salvador Díaz Mirón: documentos, estética (1956)
- Presente involuntario : evocación dramática en tres entrevistas (1957)
- La dignidad de don Quijote (1959)
- Cuaderno de estampas (1961)
- Netsuke haikai (1962)
- Sakura, tercinas del Oriente Remoto (1963)
- Una moneda de oro y otros cuentos (1965)
- Moctezuma II, Senor del Anahuac (1966)
- Historia de la literatura española, e Historia de la literatura mexicana (1966) (co-written with Guillermo Díaz-Plaja)
- Momentos de Oaxaca (1967)
- El madrigal de Cetina (1968)
- 18 novelas de "El Universal ilustrado" 1922-1925 (1969)
- Páginas escogidas (relatos, estampas, narraciones, cuentos, novela y novela corta) (1969)
- Cortejo de sombras (1971)
- Diccionario Porrúa de la lengua española (1972)
- Mariano Azuela y la crítica mexicana : estudios, artículos y resenas (1973)
- Aspectos literarios de la cultura mexicana : poetas y prosistas del siglo XVI a nuestros días (1975)
- Cumbres de la poesía mexicana en los siglos XIX y XX (1977)
- El temor de Hernán Cortés: y otras narraciones de la Nueva España (1980)
- Salvador Díaz Mirón, el hombre y su obra (1984)
