= Xanto: Novelucha libre =

1994 novel by José Luis Zárate

- Author: José Luis Zárate
- Language: Spanish
- Genre: Novel
- Published: 1994
- Publication place: México
- Pages: 172
- ISBN: 9684064926

Xanto: Novelucha libre is a novel written by Mexican writer José Luis Zárate and published in 1994. It is Zárate's first work published and also the first novel of his trilogy Las fases del mito (The phases of the myth), in which he reinvents a part of the life of some characters: El Santo, a Mexican wrestler, Dracula and Superman.

The novel is a confrontation between El Santo and Lovecraft-like deities.

== Synopsis ==
Adrián Villalobos is an office worker living in the city of Puebla (Mexico) that suffers hallucinations. His mental condition makes him to believe he is the famous Mexican wrestler and movie star known as El Santo. Villalobos begins to exchange his personality with that of El Santo more frequently since he realizes the end of the world is going to begin in Puebla and El Santo is the only hero that can stop it.

== See also ==
- Mexican literature
- Cosmic horror
