= Eduardo Lizalde =

Mexican poet, academic, and administrator (1929–2022)

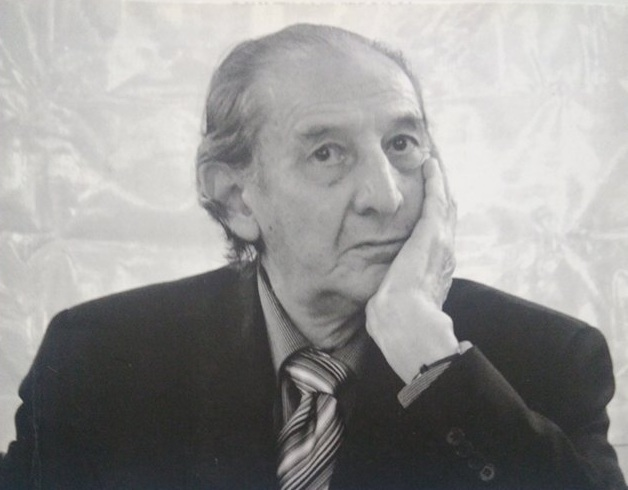
Eduardo Lizalde

Eduardo Lizalde Chávez (14 July 1929–25 May 2022) was a Mexican poet, academic and administrator.

Lizalde was known as "El Tigre" for recurring themes in his work which stem from his childhood fondness for the stories of Salgari and Kipling. As he explains: "The tiger has been a fascinating figure from Biblical times until now, and I don't believe there has ever been a writer who has never made a reference to tigers. The tiger is an image of death, destruction and, also, of beauty..."

== Career ==
Lizalde was born in Mexico City in 1929. His father, an engineer, taught him to read at an early age and introduced him to literature. He also began writing early and published his first short poems in 1948, at the age of eighteen, in the magazine El Universal. His first full book of poems, La Mala Hora, was published when he was 27. While studying literature at the National Autonomous University of Mexico (UNAM), he also attended night classes at the National Conservatory of Music.

In 1955, he became a member of the Communist Party of Mexico, but was expelled at the beginning of the 1960s, together with José Revueltas. He and Revueltas then founded the "Liga Leninista Espártaco", an alternative movement with which they both soon became disenchanted.

Shortly thereafter Lizalde, Enrique González Rojo, and Marco Antonio Montes de Oca started Poeticísmo, a literary movement which quickly fizzled out. Lizalde himself severely criticized the movement in his book Autobiografía de un Fracaso ("Autobiography of a Failure"), in which he said the movement's goal to create poetry with "originality, clarity and complexity" was so vague that, in reality, "there was nothing". In fact, despite his continuing efforts to promote Mexican literature, Lizalde has expressed dissatisfaction with his own work and poetry in general, of which he has frequently said "no sirve para nada" (it's useless).

He has served as the director of the Casa del Lago at UNAM and has held several positions at the Secretariat of Public Education. He was also the director of the José Vasconcelos Library and co-hosted Contrapunto, a weekday radio program from the Instituto Mexicano de la Radio (IMER).

== Awards and honors ==
- 1970: Awarded the Xavier Villaurrutia Prize
- 1988: Awarded the Premio Nacional de Lingüística y Literatura
- 2002: Awarded the Premio Iberoamericano Ramón López Velarde
- 2007: Elected to the Academia Mexicana de la Lengua
- 2011: Awarded the Alfonso Reyes International Prize
- 2016: Awarded the Carlos Fuentes International Prize for Literary Creation in the Spanish Language

== Selected works ==
- La Zorra Enferma, Mortiz (1974)
- Caza Mayor, UNAM (1979) ISBN 968-582-615-3
- Autobiografía de un Fracaso. El Poeticísmo, INBA (1981) ISBN 968-471-009-7
- Memoria del Tigre, Katún (1983) ISBN 968-430-034-4
- ¡Tigre, Tigre!, Fondo de Cultura Económica (1985) ISBN 968-16-1811-4
- Antología Impersonal, SEP Cultura (1986) ISBN 968-290-888-4
- Tabernarios y Eróticos, Vuelta (1988) ISBN 968-622-905-1
- Almanaque de Cuentos y Ficciones (1955-2005), ERA (2010) ISBN 607-445-033-1
- El Tigre en la Casa, Valparaíso (2013) ISBN 84-941036-1-X
