= José Carlos Becerra =

Mexican poet

José Carlos Becerra (21 May 1936 – 27 May 1970) was a Mexican poet from Villahermosa, Tabasco. He was one of only two people from Tabasco to receive a Guggenheim Fellowship. While traveling in Europe, he was killed in a car accident near Brindisi, Italy, age 34.
