= Manuel Gutiérrez Nájera =

Mexican writer and political figure

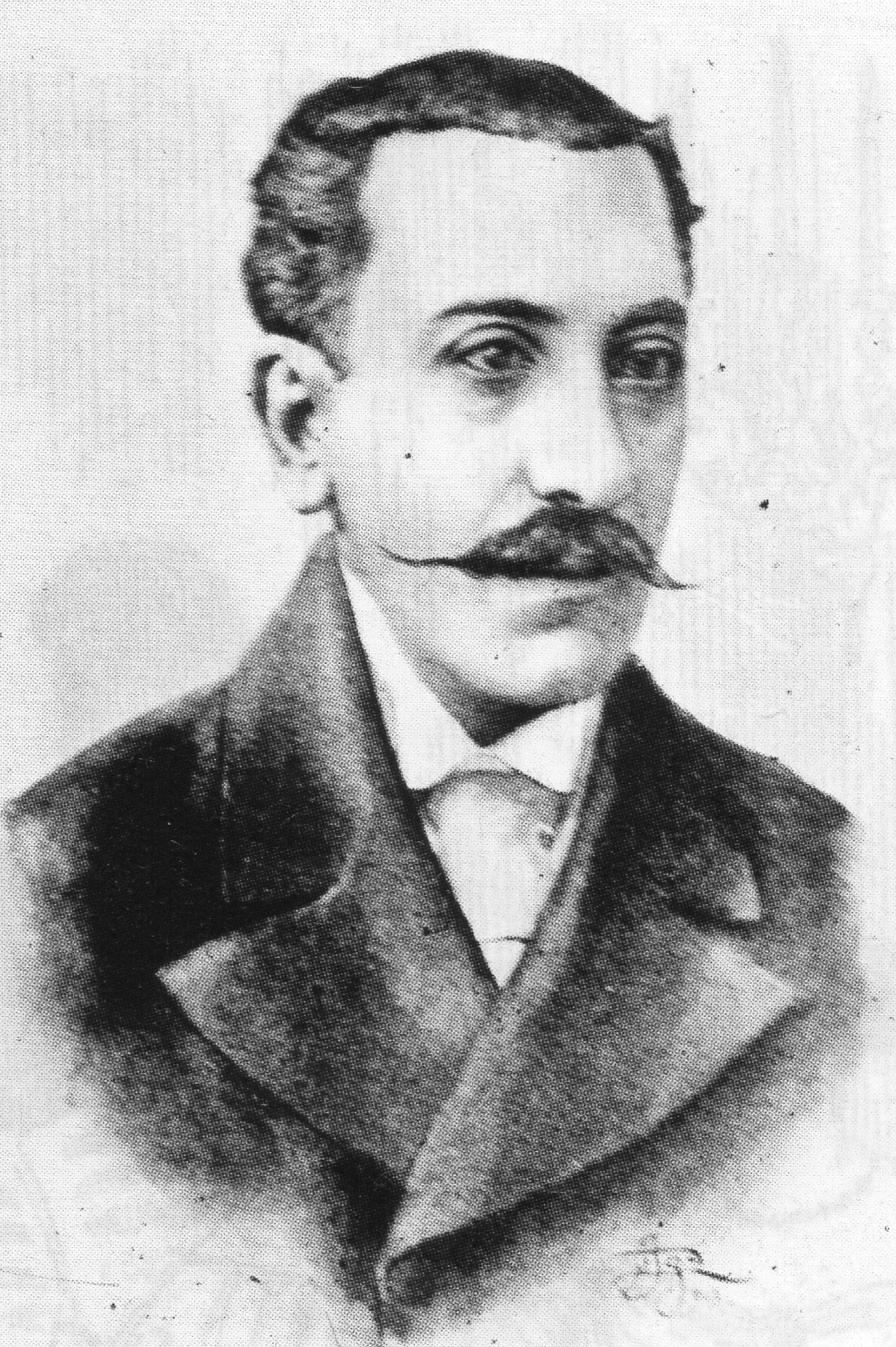
Portrait of Manuel Gutiérrez Nájera

Manuel Gutiérrez Nájera (Spanish: [maˈnwel ɣuˈtjeres ˈnaxeɾa]; (Note: In isolation, Gutiérrez is pronounced [ɡuˈtjeres].) December 22, 1859 – February 3, 1895) was a Mexican writer and political figure.

== Biography ==
Gutiérrez Nájera was born to catholic parents Manuel Gutiérrez Gómez (1818-1889) and Dolores Nájera y Huerta (1831-1895) in Mexico City on December 22, 1850. He was the oldest of four children, and received most of his early education from his mother in their home. Gutiérrez Nájera also received private lessons in French and Latin during his early which allowed him to gain an appreciation for the French authors who would later shape his literary style.

In his youth, he worked as a journalist, writing poems and short stories for Mexico City's La Iberia.

Gutiérrez Nájera served as the deputy of Texcoco. This position allowed him to marry Cecilia Maillefert. They were married until Manuel's death, and had two daughters.

Gutiérrez Nájera died in Mexico City at the age of 35, during the height of his career. Due to his hemophilia, a minor operation caused him to bleed out on the surgical table.

== Literary career and reputation ==
As a writer, Gutiérrez Nájera managed to bridge the gap between romanticism and the contemporary movements of modernismo and Symbolism in North America. He used several pseudonyms throughout his writing career, but his best known signature is El Duque Job, made famous by his poem La Duquesa Job, in which Duke Job sings of his Duchess's incomparable beauty and charm. Other pseudonyms of Gutiérrez Nájera's include Raphael, Frú-Frú, Puck, Junius, Recamier, Juan Lanas, El Cura de Jalatlaco, El Perico de los Palotes, and Mr. Can-Can. Gutiérrez Nájera likely resorted to using such a wide variety of pen names in the hopes that the people of Mexico City would not tire of reading so many pieces by the same author. In addition to using pen names, Gutiérrez Nájera simply signed some of his works with professional titles, such as "the farmer" ("el campesino), "the priest" ("el sacerdote"), or whatever other position would lend credibility to his opinions.

Gutiérrez Nájera's first works appeared in La Iberia in 1873, when he was just 13 years old. His verse was influenced heavily by French writer Paul Verlaine, as well as by Alfred de Musset, Théophile Gautier, and Gustavo Adolfo Bécquer, among others. His essay, Art and Materialism, was published in La Iberia in 1876 and is considered to be the first modernist manifesto.

He was the founder of the Mexican magazine Revista Azul alongside fellow friend and writer Carlos Díaz Dufoo in 1894. Besides pioneering the modernist movement in Mexico himself, Gutiérrez Nájera's Revista Azul helped to establish several aspiring young modernist authors of the time, including José A. Castillón. He was also an editor of Mexico City periodical, El Partido Liberal.

Just before his death, he was named president of La Asociación de Prensa de México (Mexico's Associated Press).

Due to the brevity of his career, as well as his tendency to use a wide range of pseudonyms, most of Gutiérrez Nájera's works was not organized into collections until after his death. Many of his works were published posthumously.

== Works ==
Collections of Gutiérrez Nájera's short stories and chronicles include:

- Cuentos frágiles ("Gossamer Stories")
- Cuentos de color de humo ("Smoke-colored Stories")
- Crónicas color de rosa ("Rose-Colored Chronicles")
- Crónicas color de lluvia ("Rain-Colored Chronicles")
- Crónicas color de oro ("Gold-Colored Chronicles")
- Crónicas de mil colores ("Chronicles of a Thousand Colors")

Some of Gutiérrez Nájera's more popular poems include:

- La Duquesa Job
- Non omnis moriar
- Para entonces
- De blanco
- Mis enlutadas
