= Francisco Javier Alegre =

Mexican Jesuit scholar, translator and historian (1729–1788)

Francisco Xavier Alegre
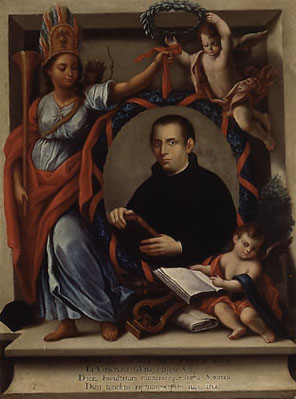
- Portrait (late 18th century)
- Born: 12 November 1729; Veracruz, Mexico
- Died: 16 August 1788 (aged 58) near Bologna, Italy
- Other name: Francisco Javier Alegre (modern-day)
- Education: Royal College of San Ignacio (Puebla)
- Occupations: Historian, translator and scholar

Francisco Xavier Alegre (November 12, 1729 – August 16, 1788) was a Mexican Jesuit scholar, translator, and historian of New Spain.

== Life ==
Alegre was born in Veracruz, New Spain. He studied philosophy in the Royal College of San Ignacio in Puebla, then canon and civil law in Mexico City and theology in Angelópolis. On March 19, 1747, he entered the novitiate with the Company of Jesus (Jesuits) in Tepozotlán. According to his own account, he learned Italian, Greek, Hebrew and Náhuatl. He was able to preach in Náhuatl. He was a dedicated scholar of theology, history, mathematics, and especially classical literature.

He later taught grammar in Mexico City, and during those years he learned French. For reasons of health he returned to Veracruz, where he taught for two years. He then returned to Mexico City to take an examination in theology, and there he was ordained a priest.

His health was still poor. He was sent to Havana, where he taught rhetoric and philosophy for seven years.

On leaving Havana, he went to Mérida, to the Jesuit college there. He took over the work on the Historia de la provincia begun by Father Francisco de Florencia (1620–1695). He continued work on this history when he moved to the Royal College and Seminary of San Ildefonso in Mexico City. In less than three years, he finished the Historia de la Compañía de Jesús en Nueva España. This work was on the point of being published when the Jesuits were expelled from the Spanish dominions, on July 25, 1767. When he left New Spain, the manuscript and his sources remained behind.

Alegre died of apoplexy near Bologna, Italy, in 1788. Some of his works remained unpublished at his death.

== Works ==
In exile, he established himself in Bologna, Italy, and there he rewrote his Historia from memory, in the form of a compendium. It was published in Mexico in 1841–1842. He also wrote 18 books, published together under the title Instituciones teológicas.

His literary works included Alexandrias, a short epic poem about the conquest of Tyre by Alexander the Great (1775) and a Latin eclogue entitled Nysus. He also published a Latin translation of the Iliad, at Bologna in 1776 and, after revisions, at Rome in 1788. He translated the first three cantos of Nicolas Boileau's L'Art poétique into Spanish.

He left quite a number of shorter works, mostly translations of classics. Among them are the "Alexandriadas" (1773, Italy), the "Iliad" in Latin (Rome, 1788), "Homeri Batrachiomachia" in Latin (Mexico, 1789), together with fragments of Horace and a good translation into Spanish of the first three cantos of the "Art Poétique" of Boileau.

But the work for which he is especially noted is his History of the Society of Jesus in New Spain (ed. Carlos María Bustamante, Mexico, 1841). The Catholic Encyclopedia praises this work for its lack of "attacks upon Spain and the Spaniards" despite anti-Jesuit attitudes prevalent in Spain at the time.

He published Carta geográfica del hemisferio mexicano, which introduced some information about New Spain previously unknown to European scholars.

In 1889, Joaquín García Icazbaleta published his lyrical works under the title Opúsculos inéditos latinos y castellanos del P. Francisco Xavier Alegre (Unedited Latin and Spanish tracts of Father Francisco Xavier Alegre). His Latin writing style was pure and classical, comparing well with theologians of the Renaissance.
