= Salvador Díaz Mirón =

Mexican poet (1853–1928)

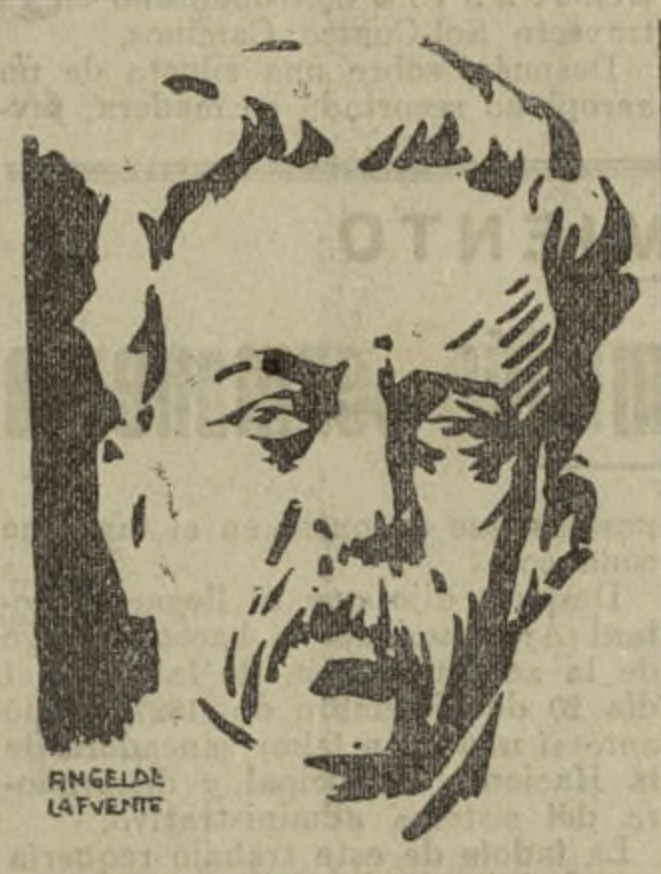
- Born: Salvador Antonio Edmundo Espiridión y Francisco de Paula Díaz Ibáñez; 14 December 1853 Veracruz, Mexico
- Died: 12 June 1928 (aged 74) Veracruz, Mexico
- Occupation: Writer, politician, journalist

Salvador Díaz Mirón (December 14, 1853 – June 12, 1928) was a Mexican poet. He was born in the port city of Veracruz. His early verse, written in a passionate, romantic style, was influenced by Lord Byron and Victor Hugo. His later verse was more classical in mode. His poem, A Gloria, was influential. His 1901 volume Lascas ("Chips from a Stone") established Diaz Mirón as a precursor of modernismo. He worked as a journalist and teacher.

As a politician, he was an opposition congressman in the 1880s, during the presidency of Porfirio Díaz. He later became supporter of Díaz, and in the 1900s he was again federal congressman.

In the 1890s, he was incarcerated for 4 years for a murder.

As a poet, he celebrated the centennial of the Mexican War of Independence. Díaz Mirón delivered the main speech at the dedication ceremony of the Angel of Independence monument, which was attended by President Porfirio Díaz and foreign dignitaries. The monument itself, also known as El Ángel, was erected to commemorate the start of the war in 1810.

Díaz Mirón was director of the Díaz aligned newspaper El Imparcial. In 1914, he resigned and went into exile in Spain and then Havana, Cuba.

In 1919 the president Venustiano Carranza allowed him to return to Mexico. He was elected a member of the Academia Mexicana de la Lengua in 1922.

Díaz Mirón died in Veracruz on June 12, 1928. His remains are interred at the Rotunda of Illustrious Persons in Mexico City.

== Work ==
- The Mexican Parnassus (1886)
- Poetry (New York, 1895)
- Poems (Paris, 1900)
- Flakes (Xalapa, 1901 with several reprints)
- Poems (1918)
- Complete Poems (UNAM, with notes of Antonio Castro Leal, 1941)
- Collection of poems (UNAM 1953)
- Prosas (1954)
