= Francisco de Terrazas =

Mexican poet

- Occupation: Poet
- Years active: 16th century
- Notable work: Sea and Land; The New World and its Conquest

Francisco de Terrazas (fl. 16th century) was a poet from New Spain who wrote during the sixteenth century. Not much is known about Terrazas's life, and his work has only been found in fragments. His works include Sea and Land and The New World and its Conquest. Don Quixote author Miguel de Cervantes Saavedra was among those who praised Terrazas.

== Personal life ==
Terrazas's father was a conquistador who died in 1549 after working as the justice of the peace in Mexico City. Based on a reference from Don Quixote author Miguel de Cervantes Saavedra, Terrazas was alive during 1583. Joaquín García Icazbalceta said that Terrazas probably traveled to Spain, where Cervantes became acquainted with him.

== Career ==
Terrazas was well known in Mexico and Spain. He might have been taught by Gutierre de Cetina as a friend or disciple, as thought by Marcelino Menéndez y Pelayo based on Terrazas imitating Cetina's work. The earliest known works by Terrazas are three sonnets that were first published in Garlands of Varied Poetry in 1577 and later republished in Essay by Bartolomé José Gallardo. By the time Garlands of Varied Poetry was published, Terrazas might have been famous and around 50 years old. The works by Terrazas can only be found in fragments, but he has been attributed as the author of Sea and Land, which was cited in History of Tlaxcala by Diego Muñoz Camargo. Terrazas wrote an epic poem, titled The New World and its Conquest. In a fragment of The New World and Its Conquest, Terrazas wrote about Francisco Hernández de Córdoba traveling on a failed expedition to the Bay Islands Department. In one of the fragments. Terrazas compared conquistador Hernán Cortés to king Xerxes I. Another fragment has the speech that Cortés gave to the indigenous people of Cozumel with the help of the indigenous interpreter Melchorejo. Terrazas wrote a poem about the love between indigenous Huitzel and Quetzal in another fragment. The epic poem begins with two unsuccessful expeditions to Mexico before Cortés, and documented Cortés's interpreter Gerónimo de Aguilar.

== Reception ==
Terrazas received praised from his contemporaries. Andrés Dorantes de Carranza said that Terrazas "wrote excellent poetry in the Tuscan, Latin, and Castilian languages". Cervantes wrote of Terrazas, "The first, Francisco de Terrazas, has a name known here and there. His genius has given a new Hippocrene to his lucky native land."

Carlos González Peña said in his book History of Mexican Literature that Terrazas's sonnets were "facile and elegant" and that Terrazas "lacked vigor and polish. Icazbalceta said that Terrazas had "mediocre ability". His lyrical poetry was said by some critics to be mannerist, especially that of the story of Huitzel and Quetzal.

However, more recent criticism has found much to be admired in the “tender lyricism and expressive gentleness” of both The New World fragments and his excellent Petrarchan sonnets.
