= Maruxa Vilalta =

Catalan-born Mexican playwright and theatre director

Maria Vilalta i Soteras (23 September 1932 – 19 August 2014) was a Catalan-born Mexican playwright and a theatre director. Her plays have been translated, published and produced in numerous countries. She won the critic’s prize for the best play of the year ten times. In November 2010 she was awarded the National Prize for Arts and Sciences in the field of Linguistics and Literature, for her work which has national and international resonance.

== Early life and education ==
Maruxa Vilalta was born in Barcelona in 1932, daughter of lawyer Antonio Vilalta y Vidal, and María Soteras Maurí. Antonio Her father was a supporter for the Estatut de la Generalitat and one of the founders of Esquerra Republicana party. He was also a distinguished jurist, elected and proclaimed deputy of the Ilustre Colegio de Abogados de Barcelona. María Soteras was the first woman to graduate with a degree in law from the University of Barcelona and she was also a member of the Colegio de Abogados. In 1936, at the start of the Civil War in Spain, they went in exile to Brussels and they arrived in Mexico by the way of New York City in 1939. She became a Mexican citizen at eight years of age. She received all her education in Mexico, from primary school and then six years of French baccalauréat at the Liceo Franco Mexicano. She enrolled in the School of Liberal Arts at the Universidad Nacional Autónoma de México, where she studied for a master's degree in Spanish literature.

== Career ==
Vilalta started as a novelist. Her first works were El castigo (The Punishment) in 1957, Los desorientados (The Disoriented Ones), reprinted several times in 1959, and Dos colores para el paisaje (Two Colors for the Landscape) in 1961. She adapted Los desorientados for the theatre and since the first performance, in 1960, she began her career as a playwright. She wrote dramas and some short stories, among them El otro día, la muerte (The Other Day, Dead), a 1974 collection which includes Diálogos del narrador, la muerte y su invitado (Dialogues of the Narrator, Death and Her Guest), Romance con la muerte de agua (The Romance of Watery Death), Aventura con la muerte de fuego (Adventure with Fiery Death), and Morir temprano, mientras comulga el general (To Die Early, While the General Receives Communion).

Vilalta was a stage manager in plays by such writers as Jean Anouilh, Peter Ustinov, and many others. Since 1970, she only managed her own plays, however. She gave theater courses, seminars and conferences in universities and cultural centers from Mexico and other countries. Researcher María Elena Reuben, of Hofstra University (New York), compiled a bibliography of Vilalta's work.

Fondo de Cultura Económica published several plays by Vilalta in the collections Teatro I (1972, fourth edition 1997), Teatro II (1989, second edition 1992) and Teatro III (1990, third edition 1994).

In 2002 the Universidad Nacional Autónoma de México (UNAM) published, in "Voz Viva" series, the CD-book Antología de teatro (Anthologie of Theatre), with selections from plays of Maruxa Vilalta in the voice of the author and in published texts. The same year, the Sociedad General de Escritores de México publishes three plays from this dramaturge in the CD Cien años de teatro mexicano (One Hundred Years of Mexican Theater). In November 2003 Fondo de Cultura Económica published Antología de obras de teatro de Maruxa Vilalta (Anthology of Theatrical Works by Maruxa Vilalta) in its collection, Letras Mexicanas. In 2006, Edwin Mellen Press (Lewiston, New York) published A Voice in the Wilderness. The Life of Saint Jerome, translated by Edward Huberman and Sharon Magnarelli.

In 2006–07, Ignacio y los jesuitas was performed in El Progreso, Honduras, Lafragua Theater. In 2007, Una mujer, dos hombres y un balazo was performed in Bogotá, Colombia, produced by the Universidad Estatal. In 2007, Con vista a la bahía (With a View of the Bay), was performed in Mexico, and published in 2010 by CONACULTA (Consejo Nacional para la Cultura y las Artes).

== Plays and awards ==
- Los disorientados (The Disoriented Ones), 1960.
- Un país feliz (A Happy Country), 1964.
- Soliloquio del Tiempo (Time's Soliloquy), 1964.
- Un día loco (A Crazy Day), 1964.
- La última letra (The Last Letter), 1964.
- El 9 (Number Nine), 1965.
- Cuestión de narices (A Question of Noses), 1966. Prize for the Best Group and Best Director, Ramón Dagés, at the Manresa Theatre Festival, 1974.
- Esta noche juntos, amándonos tanto (Together Tonight, Loving Each Other so Much), 1970. Juan Ruiz de Alarcón Best Play of the Year Prize, and Best Play of the Year Prize at the Las Máscaras Festival, Morelia.
- Nada como el piso 16 (Nothing Like the Sixteenth Floor), 1976. Juan Ruiz de Alarcón Best Play of the Year Prize and Sor Juana Inés de la Cruz Best Play of the Year Prize.
- Historia de él (The Story of Him), 1978. Juan Ruiz de Alarcón Best Play of the Year Prize and El Fígaro Best Play of the Year Prize.
- Una mujer, dos hombres y un balazo (A Woman, Two Men and One Bullet), 1981. It contents four one act-plays that can be staged separately.
- Pequeña historia de horror (y de amor desenfrenado) (Little Story of Horror (and Unbridled Love)), 1985.
- Una voz en el desierto. Vida de San Jerónimo (A Voice in the Wilderness. The Life of Saint Jerome) Mexican Association of Theatre Critics Best Play of Creative Research Prize, 1991. Society of Theatre Journalists Prize and the Claridades Best Play of the Year Prize (both 1991).
- Francisco de Asís (Francis of Assisi), Mexican Association of Theater Critics Best Play of Creative Research Prize), 1992.
- Jesucristo entre nosotros (Jesus Christ Among Us), 1994.
- Ignacio y los jesuitas (Ignatius and the Jesuits), 1997.
- 1 9 1 0 (1 9 1 0), 2000/2001.
- Con vista a la bahía (With a View of the Bay) is produced by Conaculta, Instituto Nacional de Bellas Artes and Centro Cultural Helénico, from May until September 2007.

== Death ==
Vilalta died on 19 August 2014, aged 81.

== Sources ==
- (Spanish) Diccionario de escritores mexicanos, siglo XX : desde las generaciones del Ateneo y novelistas de la Revolución hasta nuestros días. Mexico: Universidad Nacional Autónoma de México, Instituto de Investigaciones Filológicas, Centro de Estudios Literarios, 1988.
