= Diego José Abad =

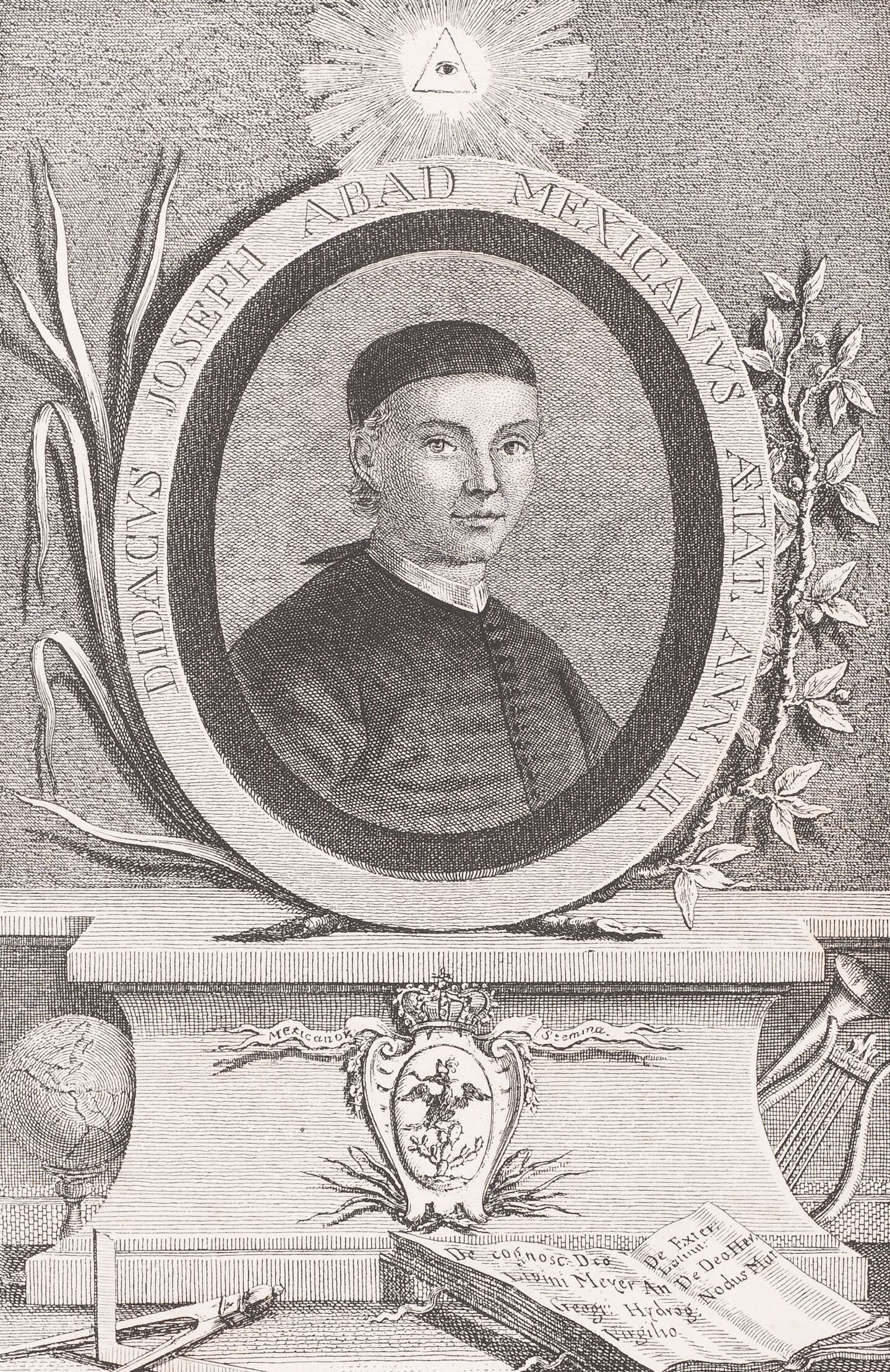
Diego José Abad

Diego José Abad y García (1 June 1727 in La Lagunita, near Jiquilpan, Michoacán – 30 September 1779 in Bologna, Italy) was a Jesuit poet and translator in New Spain and Italy.

== Biography ==
Abad y García studied letters and philosophy at the College of San Ildefonso. In 1741 he entered the Society of Jesus (Jesuits), becoming a teacher of rhetoric, philosophy, canon law and civil law in seminaries of the order in Mexico City, Zacatecas and Querétaro.

In 1767, at the time of the expulsion of the Jesuits from the Spanish Empire, he was rector of the seminary of San Francisco Xavier in Querétaro. Like all other Jesuits, he was deported from the colony and left for Italy. He lived initially in Ferrara, and later in Bologna.

== Works ==
In 1750 he wrote Rasgo descriptivo de la fábrica y grandezas del templo de la Compañía de Jesús en Zacatecas (Descriptive flourish of the fabrication and grandeur of the Church of the Company of Jesus in Zacatecas), in eight-line stanzas in the manner of Luis de Góngora. He translated part of the Aeneid of Virgil into Castilian verse, and also Virgil's eighth Eclogue. In 1775 he wrote Cursus philosophicus (Philosophical Course) (four volumes).

His most important work is the didactic poem De Deo heroica carmina, which was begun in Querétaro and finished in Italy. It is written in Latin hexameter, in a strong style. It is divided into two parts, a Suma theologica and a life of Christ. The poem was published under various titles, and the second edition at least, under a pseudonym. The first edition was published with 29 cantos at Cádiz in 1769, the second at Venice in 1773, and the third at Ferrara in 1775. The definitive edition, in 43 cantos, was published posthumously at Cesana in 1780. The poem found many admirers.

Benjamín Fernández Valenzuela translated the work into Spanish in 1974, under the title Poema heroico. He wrote "The Poema heroico is the song of a new man who scrutinizes his history... and finds in his own time a sign of eternity."

Other works of Abad y García include:

- Compendio de álgebra
- Tratado del conocimiento de Dios (in Italian)
- Geografía hidrográfica (about notable rivers of the world)
- De Livino Meyer, el alma y su inclusión in the pequeñez del cuerpo
- El embrollado problema de las matemáticas resuelto
- Dissertación cómico seria acerca de la cultura Latina de los extranjeros
- Himnos del oficio de San Felipe de Jesús

He died in 1779 in Bologna.
