= Pilar Gonzalbo Aizpuru =

Spanish-Mexican academic (born 1935)

- Born: 13 January 1935; Madrid, Spain
- Died: 26 February 2024 (aged 89)
- Education: Central University of Madrid (nowadays Complutense) and National Autonomous University of Mexico
- Occupation: Academic
- Awards: National Prize for Arts and Sciences in the category of History, Social Sciences and Philosophy (Mexico, 2007).
- Scientific career
- Workplaces: Center for Historical Studies of El Colegio de México (since 1980)

Pilar Gonzalbo Aizpuru (13 January 1935 in Madrid, Spain - 26 February 2024) was a Spanish-Mexican academic who specialized in the cultural history of New Spain. In 2007 she received, along with archaeologist Eduardo Matos Moctezuma, the National Prize for Arts and Sciences of Mexico in the category of History, Social Sciences, and Philosophy.

Gonzalbo was a member of the Advisory Council on Sciences of the Presidency of Mexico and the Mexican Academy of Sciences.

== Biography ==
She received a degree in History of the Americas at the Complutense University of Madrid. She moved to Mexico City where she earned a Master's degree in Pedagogy, graduating with the thesis "Female education in New Spain: Colleges, Convents and Girls' Schools" and a Doctorate in History at the Faculty of Philosophy and Letters of the National Autonomous University of Mexico.

From 1980 she worked as a professor and researcher at the Center for Historical Studies of El Colegio de México, of which she was academic coordinator from 1989 to 2001. Additionally, she taught at the National Autonomous University of Mexico, at the Ibero-American University (UIA) and at the National School of Anthropology and History (ENAH).

She was a member of the Mexican Academy of Sciences, the Association of Latin American Historians and the Latin American Council of Social Sciences (CLACSO). She was a researcher for the National System of Researchers, and was appointed Emeritus researcher since 2006. She was a member of the Science Advisory Council of the Presidency of the Republic.

She is considered the leading specialist in the history of education in the Viceroyalty of New Spain; the value of her research in this area is her great knowledge of the history of Iberian and New Spain pedagogical institutions and ideas, such as Humanism. She is noted for her work on the history of the family in the colonial period, as well as observing the role of women in the history of Mexico. She is the introducer in Mexico of the Historiographic perspective, of French origin, which is known as the history of everyday life. Her research is supported by archive sources, such as: Archivo General de la Nación de México (AGN), Archivo del Arzobispado de México, General Archive of the Indies, Archive of the National Library of Mexico (BNM), archive of the Historical Archive of Mexico City. In her various works, her archival work and how she interpreted the information can be observed, making with it several specialized books on the history of women, castes, their education, and their role in daily life, as well as the education of the Jesuits.

Dr. Gonzalbo's interests focus on topics related to cultural history: family, women, education, daily life, and history of emotions. Her nine books of personal authorship refer to these themes. Additionally, she has edited or coordinated more than twenty collective works alongside the seminar on the history of everyday life, in which she has worked together with the group that has collaborated for more than two decades.

She was the author, editor, and coordinator of a series of books and numerous articles and book chapters in which she addresses the subject of history, mainly in the colonial period. Her works include the series "History of daily life in Mexico" published by Fondo de Cultura Económica and El Colegio de México in five volumes, with the collaboration of leading specialists on the subject.

In 2016, she ventured into massive open online courses (MOOC) with the course "History of daily life", produced by the Digital Education Program of El Colegio de México under the Mexico X platform. This massive open online course had 6,421 people enrolled, of which 1,341 completed all the evaluations in a timely manner.

== Distinctions and recognitions ==
- Recognition and honorable mention by the National Institute of Anthropology and History in 1999.
- "Gabino Barreda" Medal for his postgraduate studies at the National Autonomous University of Mexico in 1983.
- Best Review Award granted by the Mexican Committee of Historical Sciences in 2005.
- "Antonio Cubas" Prize awarded by the National Institute of Anthropology and History in 2005.
- Emeritus Researcher by the National System of Researchers in 2006.
- National Prize of Sciences and Arts, Social Sciences in the area of History and Philosophy in 2007

== Works ==
She has written more than 60 articles and book chapters, coordinated more than 16 books and authored another eight, notable works include:

- The education of women in New Spain, 1985.
- Women in New Spain. Education and Everyday Life, 1987.
- The popular education of the Jesuits, 1989.
- History of education in colonial times. The indigenous world, 1990.
- History of education in colonial times. Creole education and urban life, 1990.
- New Spanish families: 16th to 19th centuries, coordinator, 1991.
- Family history, coordinator, 1993.
- The family in the Ibero-American world, coordinator, 1994.
- Family and private life in the history of Latin America, coordinator, 1996.
- Rural and Indigenous Education in Ibero-America, coordinator, 1996.
- Gender, family and mentalities in Latin America, coordinator, 1997.
- Family and Colonial Order, 1998.
- Family and education in Ibero-America, coordinator, 1999.
- Ibero-American families. History, identity and conflicts, coordinator, 2001.
- Women in the construction of Ibero-American societies, coordinator, 2004.
- Alltagsgeschichte in Mexico, 5 volumes, director, 2005. (Monumental work in which several historians involved)
- Introduction to the history of everyday life, 2006.
- Traditions and conflicts. Stories of daily life in Mexico and Latin America, coordinator, 2007.
- Joys and sufferings in the history of Mexico, coordinator, 2007.
- Live in New Spain. Order and disorder in everyday life, 2009.
- The fears in history, coordinator, 2009.
- A history of the uses of fear, coordinator, 2009.
- Families and Differential Relationships: Gender and Age, coordinator, 2010.
- History of education in Mexico City, coordinator, 2012.
- Education, family and daily life in viceregal Mexico, 2013
- Love and history. The expression of affections in the world of yesterday, coordinator, 2013.
- New Spanish society: stereotypes and realities, with Solange Alberro, 2013.
- Spaces in history: invention and transformation of social spaces, 2014.
- Conflict, resistance and negotiation in history, 2016.
- The Invisible Walls: New Spanish Women and the Impossible Equality, 2016.
- From the neighborhood to the capital: Tlatelolco and Mexico City in the 18th century, 2017.
- Secular in the cloister. Happiness and misfortunes of New Hispanic women, 2018.
