= Ricardo Garibay =

Mexican writer and journalist

Ricardo Garibay (January 18, 1923 – May 3, 1999) was a Mexican writer and journalist. He studied law at the National Autonomous University of Mexico, where he was also a professor of literature. He also served as the chief of press for the Secretariat of Public Education and hosted the television program "Kaleidoscope" on the Imevisión Channel 13 network, Imevisión. He was president of the College of Sciences and Arts of Hidalgo in Pachuca.

His work appeared in the Magazine of the University of Mexico, Proceso (which he co-founded), Novedades and Excélsior. He was a fellow of the Mexican Center of Writers from 1952 to 1953, and joined the National System of Artistic Creators of Mexico (SNCA) as creator emeritus upon its foundation in 1994.

== Biography ==
He made his entry in television in 1975, first on Canal Once and then on Canal 13. channel 11 and then 13 (then Imevisión). Programs he created include Autores y libros (Authors and Books), A los normalistas con amor (To the Normalistas With Love), Poesía para militantes (Poetry for Militants) and Mujeres, mujeres, mujeres (Women, Women, Women). He also wrote several books, including Cómo se pasa la vida which compiles his biweekly column from Diorama de la Cultura. Garibay received several awards throughout his career including: a French award for best foreign novel in France in 1975 for The House that Burns at Night; the National Journalism Award in 1987; and the Colima Narrative Prize in 1989 for Taib. He was named Creator Emeritus of Conaculta in 1994.

== Work published ==
=== Anthology ===
- Garibay between the lines, Ocean, Mexico, 1985.

=== Chronicle ===
- The glories of the great Barbs Grijalbo, Mexico, 1979; 2a. ed., 1991.
- Tendajón mixed Proceso, Mexico, 1989.

=== Stories ===
- The new lover (platelet count), Costa-Amic, Monday, 26, Mexico, 1949.
- Tales Costa-Amic, epigraphs, 15, 1952.
- The Colonel Panoramas, Mexico, 1955.
- Rhapsody for a scandal, Novarro, Mexico, 1971.
- The government body, Joaquin Mortiz, Mexico, 1977.
- The smoke of the train and the smoke asleep (platelet count), Center for Information and Development of Communication and Children's Literature, clock Stories, Mexico, 1985.
- Cullet mirror State Government of Tabasco, Mexico, 1989.

=== Essay ===
- Our Lady of Solitude in Coyoacán, Ministry of Public Education (SEP), Mexico, 1955.
- How life goes, UNAM, Contemporary Texts, 1975.
- Dialogues Mexicanos Joaquin Mortiz, Counterpoint, Mexico, 1975.
- Confrontations (conference), Universidad Autonoma Metropolitana-Azcapotzalco (UAM-A), Mexico, 1984.
- Occupation read Ocean, 1996.

=== Screenwriting ===
- Iron Brothers , Dir. Ismael Rodriguez, 1961.
- What is Caesar Joaquin Mortiz, New Narrative Hispanic, Mexico, 1970.
- The thousand uses, 1971.
- The Barbs Agata, Guadalajara, Mexico, 1991.

=== Memories ===
- Fiera childhood and years, Ocean, Mexico, 1982; CNCA, Mexico, 1992.
- How to make a living, Joaquin Mortiz, Counterpoint, Mexico, 1992.

=== Novels ===
- Mazamitla Presents, Mexico, 1954; Costa-Amic, 1955.
- Drink a cup, Joaquin Mortiz, Series Volador, Mexico, 1962. Mazatlan Prize for Literature 1965
- Beautiful bay, Joaquin Mortiz, Mexico, 1968.
- The house that burns night, Joaquin Mortiz, Series Volador, Mexico, 1971; Ministry of Public Education (SEP) / Joaquin Mortiz, Mexican Readings, 2nd series, 45, Mexico, 1986.
- Pair of Kings, Ocean, Mexico, 1983.
- Aires de blues, Grijalbo, Mexico, 1984.
- Chamois UAM-Azcapozalco, Mexico, 1988.
- TAIB Grijalbo, Mexico, 1989.
- Triste domingo Joaquin Mortiz, Contemporary Novelists, Mexico, 1991.
- Trio , Grijalbo, Mexico, 1993.

=== Reports ===
- What you see you live! Excelsior, Mexico, 1976.
- Acapulco Grijalbo, Mexico, 1979.

=== Theatre ===
- Women in an act, Posada, Mexico, 1978.
- Lindas master! Joaquin Mortiz, Series Volador, Mexico, 1987.
