= Luis de Sandoval Zapata =

17th century Mexican poet

Luis de Sandoval y Zapata was a poet born in New Spain, probably between 1618 and 1629. He died in Mexico City in 1671. It is considered that he was a very famous author at his time, even though he has been "forgotten" by Mexican literature.

== Biography ==
He was son of Jerónimo Sandoval y Zapata and of Bernardina de Porras. He studied at the Old San Ildefonso College, and was interested in religion topics. He married Teresa de Villanueva and had four children with her.

== Works and style ==
Most of his work has been lost. However, some of it has been recovered, and because of them it is known that he wrote baroque style prose about literature and philosophical topics. His most famous writing was a sonnet to Virgen de Guadalupe, published by father Florencia and later reproduced by Antonio Mendoza in 1725. He also wrote Panegírico a la paciencia, published in 1645, and a few comedies. Alfonso Plancarte discovered 29 sonnets written by him. His works were edited in 1986 by José Pascual Buxó, and reflect the creole thinking and intellectuality that are aware of the European style and events. There are some Sandoval's works that were dedicated to the Immaculate Conception, that were awarded in a Royal and Pontifical University of Mexico contest. He also has sonnets, octaves and a romance entitled Relación fúnebre a la infeliz, trágica muerte de dos caballeros... (Funeral relation to the unhappy, tragic death of two gentlemen...), in which he describes the Martín Cortés' (son of Hernán Cortés) and brothers Ávila's conspiration, both creoles sons of conquistadors.

He wrote the theatre plays:

- Lo que es ser predestinado, prohibited by the Holy Office;
- El gentil hombre de Dios, presented at Corpus Christi;
- Dos comedias de santa Tecla;
- Dos autos sacramentales;
- Los triunfos de Jesús sacramentado;
- Andrómeda y Perseo.
