= Manuel José Othón =

Mexican poet, playwright, and politician

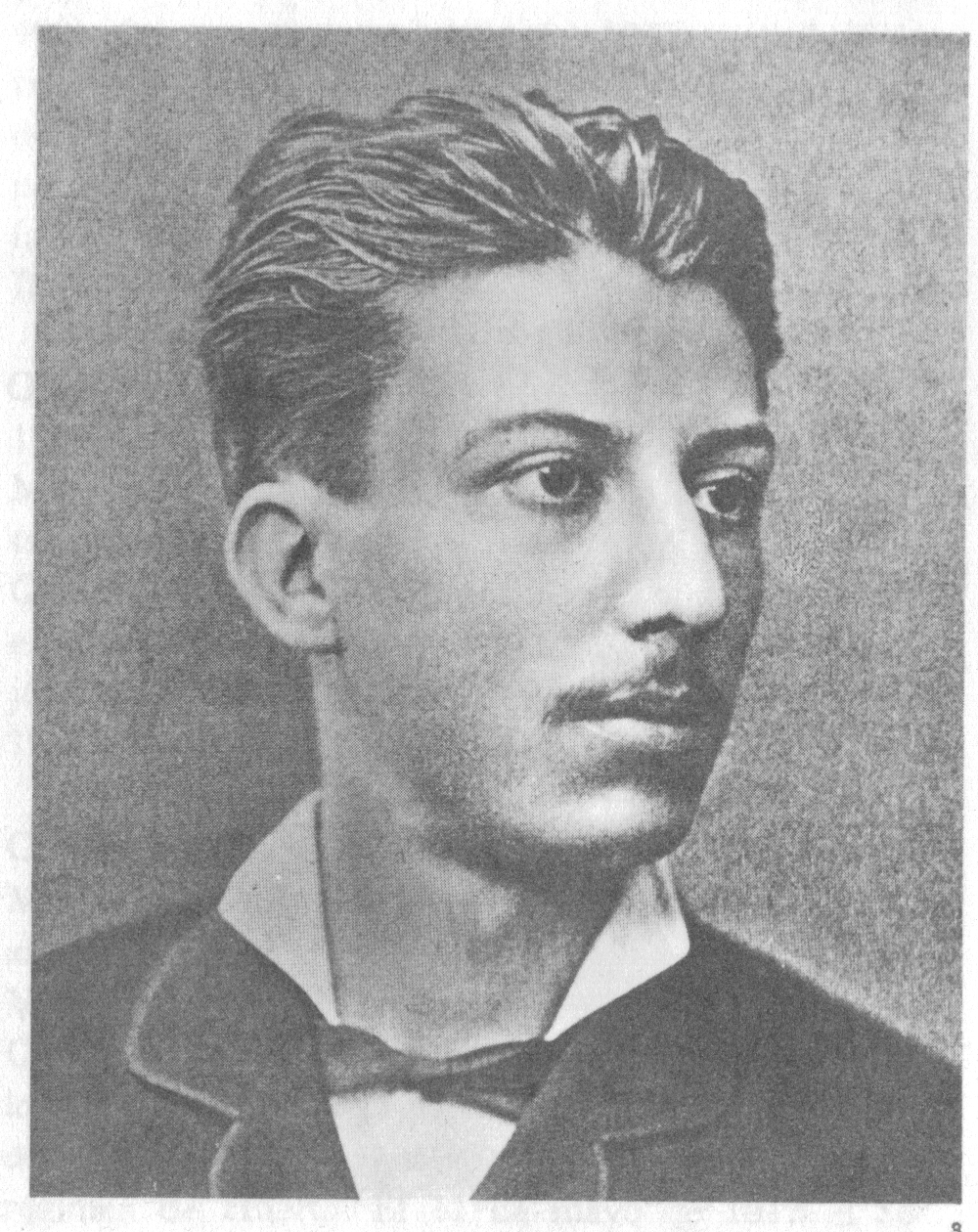
- Portrait of Manuel José Othón in his youth.
- Born: 14 June 1858; San Luis Potosí, San Luis Potosí, Mexico
- Died: 28 November 1906 (aged 48); San Luis Potosí, San Luis Potosí, Mexico
- Known for: Poet, Politician, Playwright

Manuel José Othón (June 14, 1858 – November 28, 1906) was a Mexican poet, playwright, and politician. One of his most famous works is Idilio salvaje, considered one of the most representative poems of Mexico.

== Early life and studies ==
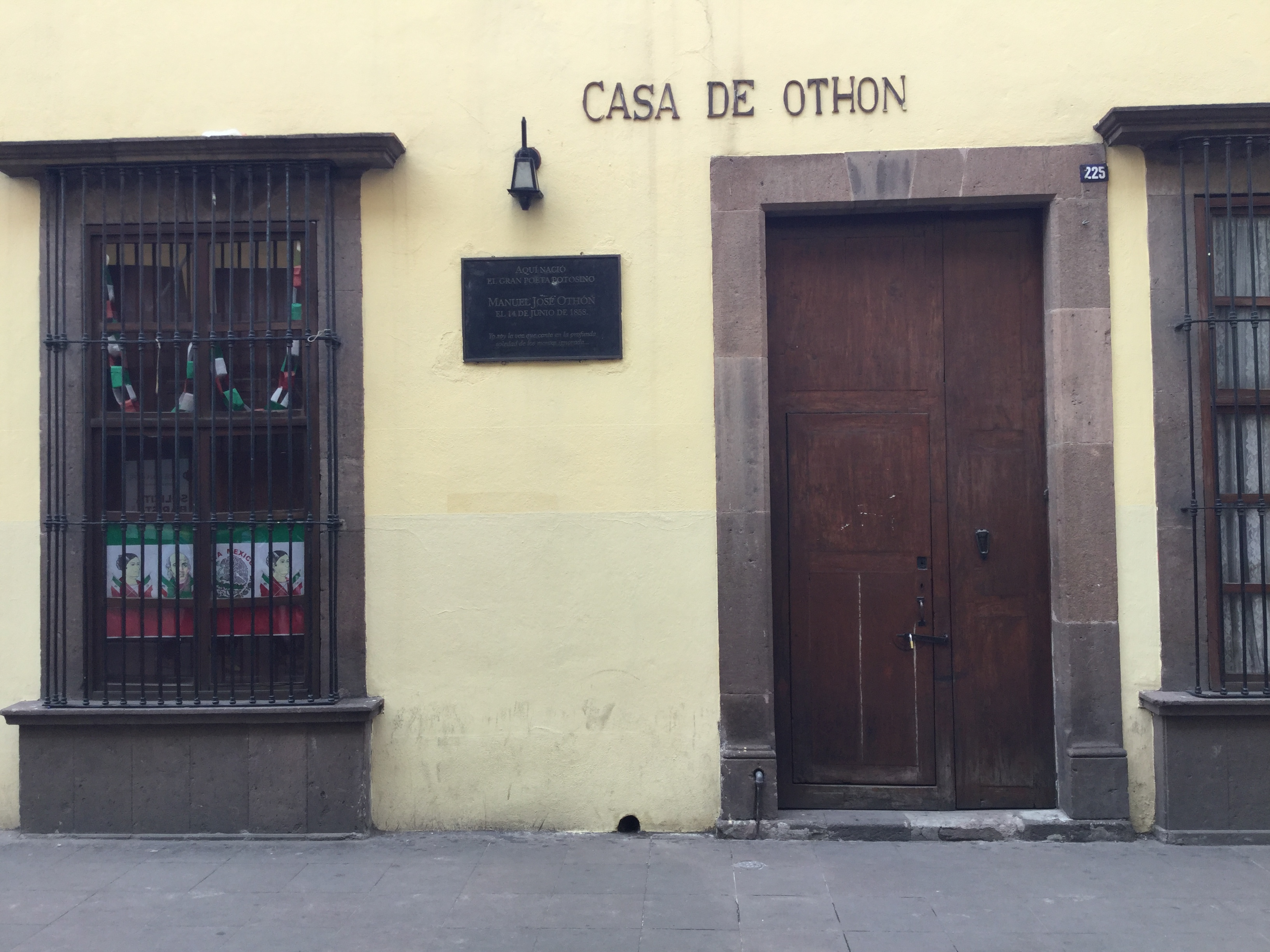
House where was born the poet in San Luis Potosí, now Museo Othoniano.

Othón was born in San Luis Potosí, San Luis Potosí, Mexico.

During his life he worked for the following newspapers and magazines:

- El Búcaro
- El Pensamiento
- La Esmeralda
- La Voz de San Luis
- El Correo de San Luis
- El Estandarte and
- El Contemporáneo.

== Literary life ==
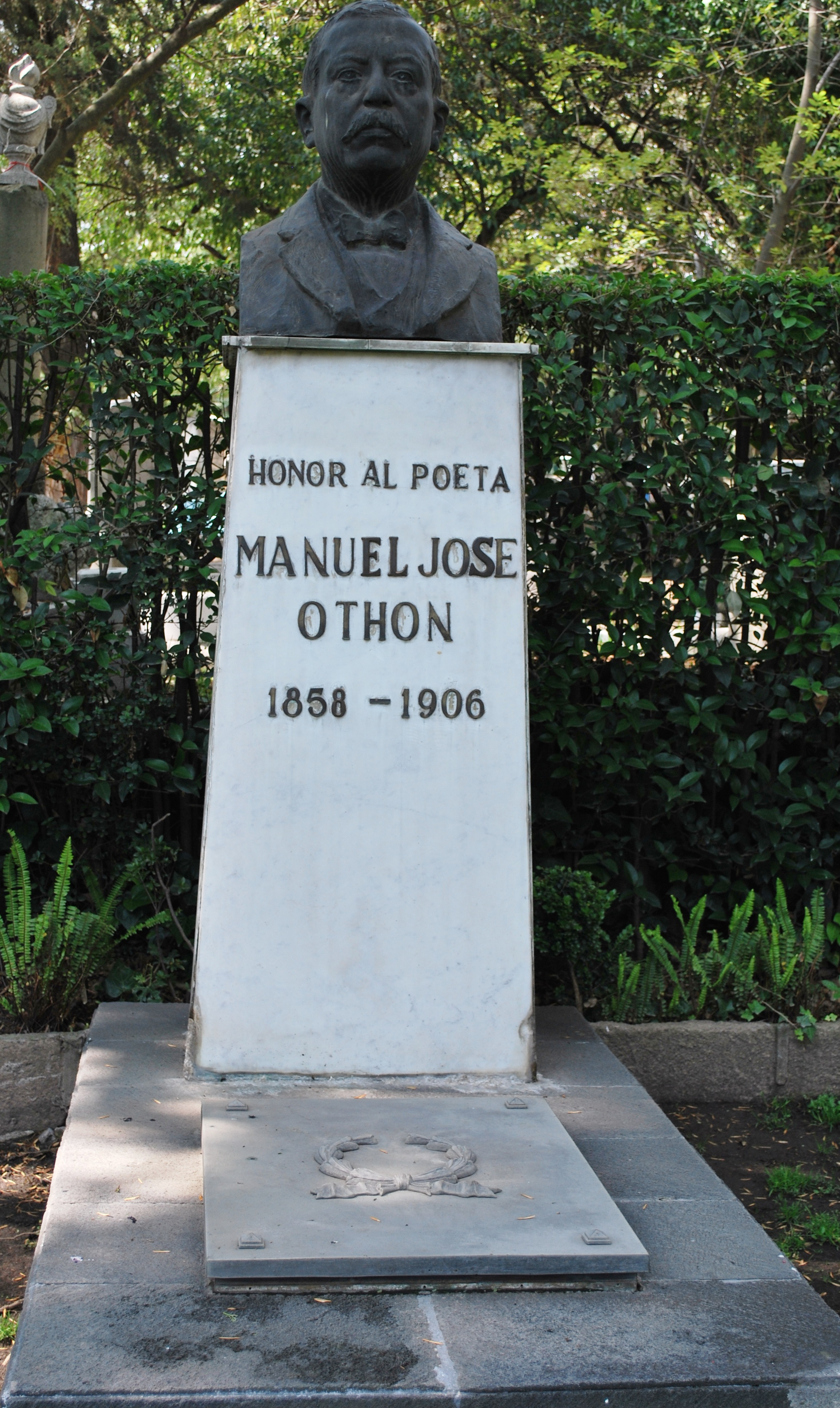
The grave marker of Manuel José Othón at the Rotunda of Illustrious Persons.

Othón began writing poetry at the age of 13. At 21, he began to publish his works under the name of Poesías. Three years later he published another poetry book. He wrote his most well-known poem Idilio salvaje in 1906.

== Death and legacy ==
Othón died in San Luis Potosí on November 28, 1906. In 1964, his remains were interred at the Rotunda of Illustrious Persons. Some of his work was published after his death in 1906.
