= Marco Antonio Montes de Oca =

Mexican poet and painter (1932–2009)

- Born: August 3, 1932; Mexico City, Mexico
- Died: February 7, 2009 (aged 76); Mexico City, Mexico
- Occupations: Poet, Painter
- Writing career
- Language: Spanish
- Notable works: Ruina de la infame Babilonia (1953), Delante de la luz cantan los pájaros (1959)

Marco Antonio Montes de Oca (August 3, 1932 - February 7, 2009) was a Mexican poet and painter.

Montes de Oca was a prolific and influential poet whose principal books include: Ruina de la infame Babilonia (1953), and Delante de la luz cantan los pájaros (1959), which won the Xavier Villaurrutia Prize. He also wrote a self-titled memoir in 1967, and a book of short stories Las fuentes legendarias (1966), and also dedicated a lot of time to painting and sculpturing.

Some of Montes de Oca's poetry was translated into English by Laura Villaseñor, including the books: The heart of the flute in 1978 (with an introduction by Octavio Paz), and Twenty-One Poems in 1982.

He died of a heart attack in Mexico City on February 7, 2009.

== Works ==
Poetry

- Ruina de la infame Babilonia (Stylo, 1953)
- Contrapunto de la fe (Los Presentes, 1955)
- Pliego de testimonios (Metáfora, 1956)
- Delante de la luz cantan los pájaros (FCE, Letras Mexicanas, 1959)
- Cantos al sol que no se alcanza (FCE, 1961)
- Fundación del entusiasmo (UNAM, Poemas y Ensayos, 1963)
- La parcela en el edén (Pájaro Cascabel, 1964)
- Vendimia del juglar (Joaquín Mortiz, Las Dos Orillas, 1965)
- Pedir el fuego (Joaquín Mortiz, 1968)
- Lugares donde el espacio cicatriza (Joaquín Mortiz, Las Dos Orillas, 1974)
- Se llama como quieras (UNAM, Poemas y Ensayos, 1974)
- Las constelaciones secretas (FCE, 1976)
- En honor de las palabras (Joaquín Mortiz, 1979)
- Migraciones y vísperas (Oasis, 1983)
- Cuenta nueva y otros poemas (Martín Casillas, 1983)
- Tablero de orientaciones (Premiá, 1984)
- Vaivén (Joaquín Mortiz, 1986)
- Altanoche (SEP, Lecturas Mexicanas, 1986)
- Vocación tras la ventana (bilingüe) (Centro de Estudios Universitarios Londres, 1998)

Short Stories

- Las fuentes legendarias (Joaquín Mortiz, 1966)

Memoir

- Marco Antonio Montes de Oca (Empresas Editoriales, 1967)

Anthologies

- Poesía reunida (1953–1970) (FCE, Letras Mexicanas, 1971)
- El surco y la brasa (FCE, Letras Mexicanas, 1974) Traducciones, en colaboración con Ana Luisa Vega.
- Poesía, crimen y prisión (Secretaría de Gobernación, 1975)
- Comparecencias (poesía 1968–1980) (Seix Barral, 1980)
- Pedir el fuego (antología 1953–1991) (Joaquín Mortiz/CONACULTA, 1992)
- Delante de la luz cantan los pájaros (Poesía 1953-2000) (FCE, Letras Mexicanas, 2000)
