= Alfonso Reyes International Prize =

Mexican literature award

The Alfonso Reyes International Prize (Spanish: Premio Internacional Alfonso Reyes) is a Mexican award given for meritorious lifetime contributions to literary research and criticism. It was founded in 1972 by the economist turned author/critic, Francisco Zendejas and was named in honor of Alfonso Reyes, a prominent Mexican literary critic, author and poet.

Since its creation, the prize has been awarded by the Instituto Nacional de Bellas Artes (INBA), in cooperation with the Consejo Nacional para la Cultura y las Artes (Conaculta), the Sociedad Alfonsina Internacional, the government of Nuevo León, the Universidad Autónoma de Nuevo León, the Universidad Regiomontana and the Instituto Tecnológico de Monterrey.

The first award was presented in 1973. No awards were given from 1996 to 1999 and in 2016.

== Recipients ==
- 1973: Jorge Luis Borges
- 1974: Marcel Bataillon
- 1975: Alejo Carpentier
- 1976: André Malraux
- 1977: Jorge Guillén
- 1978: James Willis Robb (Note: James Willis Robb (1918-2010, b. Queens, New York) was a Professor of Romance Languages at George Washington University. He wrote El Estilo de Alfonso Reyes (Imagen y Estructura), Fondo de Cultura Económica (1978) ISBN 968-16-0129-7)
- 1979: Carlos Fuentes
- 1980: Ernesto Mejía Sánchez
- 1981: Jacques Soustelle
- 1982: José Luis Martínez Rodríguez
- 1983: Paulette Patout (Note: Paulette Patout (b. Sète, France) was a Professor of Literature at the University of Toulouse II – Le Mirail. She wrote Alfonso Reyes et la France, Klincksieck (1978) ISBN 2-252-02059-8)
- 1984: Rubén Bonifaz Nuño
- 1985: Octavio Paz
- 1986: Alí Chumacero
- 1987: Gutierre Tibón
- 1988: Ramón Xirau
- 1989: Laurette Séjourné
- 1990: Adolfo Bioy Casares
- 1991: Andrés Henestrosa
- 1992: Arnaldo Orfila Reynal
- 1993: Joaquín Díez-Canedo (Note: Joaquín Díez-Canedo (1917–1999) was the son of poet Enrique Díez-Canedo. He was the founder of Editorial Joaquín Mortiz, a major publisher of new Mexican writers, and served as general manager of the Fondo de Cultura Económica.)
- 1994: Germán Arciniegas
- 1995: Juan José Arreola
- 2000: Arturo Uslar Pietri
- 2001: Miguel León-Portilla
- 2002: Rafael Gutiérrez Girardot
- 2003: Harold Bloom
- 2004: José Emilio Pacheco
- 2005: Antonio Candido
- 2006: Margit Frenk
- 2007: George Steiner
- 2008: Ernesto de la Peña
- 2009: Alfonso Rangel Guerra
- 2010: Mario Vargas Llosa
- 2011: Eduardo Lizalde
- 2012: Ignacio Bosque
- 2013: Fernando del Paso
- 2017: Alberto Manguel
- 2019: Herbert S. Klein
- 2020: Carlos García Gual
- 2021: Liliana Weinberg
- 2022: Malva Flores
- 2023: Elsa Cross
- 2024: Alberto Enríquez Perea
- 2025: Patrick Johansson
- 2026: José María Micó

Source: INBA
