= María Fernanda Heredia =

Ecuadorian writer, illustrator, and graphic designer (b. 1970)

María Fernanda Heredia Pacheco (Quito, 1 March 1970) is an Ecuadorian writer, illustrator and graphic designer. She writes novels and short stories for children and young people. Having obtained her bachelor's degree, she worked for several years as a graphic designer and publishing before starting to write professionally. She has been awarded on five occasions the Darío Guevara Mayorga Children's and Young People's National Award, and she was awarded with the Latin American Children's and Young People's Norma-Fundalectura prize for her novel Amigo se escribe H.

In 2015 her book Strange Days, co-written with Roger Ycaza, won the A la Orilla del Viento award of the Fondo de Cultura Económica.

== Career ==
Children's literature was never in her plans, it emerged spontaneously when she was 22 years old as a way of exploring her own feelings, looking for answers in a time of personal crisis. When the first editor that read her stories told her it was children's literature, María Fernanda was stunned.

After several years writing short stories she wrote her first novel in 2001 Amigo se escribe con H, but when she presented it to two publishing houses they turned it down, saying it was not a commercially viable. Although María Fernanda was discouraged, a close friend of hers prompted her to register her novel for the Latin American Children's Literature Norma-Fundalectura Prize, the most important prize in the region in the field, which she won.

== Style ==
Her lectors and editors highlights her simple style, full of emotions and sense of humour. Heredia writes, from her own words "to readers that thrpugout humour and love find the key to understand the sense of life".

The most relevant characters form her piece are the grandparents, who give a sense of affection, warmth and wisdom in each situation. Also, her stories about "the first love" are very significative: "Friend is written with H" ("Amigo se escribe con H"), "Cupid is a bat" ("Cupido es un muerciélago"), "There are words that fish don't understand" ("Hay palabras que los peces no entienden"), "Broken Hard Operation" ("Operación Corazón Roto"), among others; where romantic love is in a second plane to give its way to a more cheerful, real and sometimes foolish love.

At the same time, her work puts in question the adult world - divorce, abandonment, rupture, domestic violence- or current issues at the school context such as bullying, harassment, stalking, sexting, etc.

Even though her style is always fresh and delicate, this is not a reason to elude important and serious matters in the life of children and the youth, creating in this way a natural and spontaneous identification with the reader: "In my books I don't speak to children in a maternal or a pedagogycal way, and is probable that this is the reason to connect with complicity and closeness with them. I think that language is simple, clear and a wide metaphor that allow to reach kids and also adults".

== Awards and recognition ==
- Darío Guevara Mayorga, categories best children's story and best illustration. Awarded by the municipality of Quito in 1997 to the work Como debo hacer para no olvidarte.
- Norma-Fundalectura, categories for best children's story for children from 6 to 10 years old. Awarded by Editorial Norma and Fundalectura foundation in 2003to the work Amigo se escribe con H.
- Benny, categorie for best illustration for a children's book. Awarded by Printing Industries of America (PIA) in 2003 to the work Por si no te lo he dicho.
- A la orilla del viento, from the Economic Culture Fund with the book "Los días raros, written in conjunction with Roger Ycaza.
