= Rafael Gutiérrez =

Rafael Gutiérrez may refer to:

- Rafael Antonio Gutiérrez (1845–1921), president of El Salvador
- Rafael Garza Gutiérrez (1896–1974), Mexican football player and coach
- Rafael López Gutiérrez (1855–1924), president of Honduras
- Rafael de Izquierdo y Gutíerrez (1820–1882), Governor General of the Philippines
- Rafael Gutiérrez Girardot (1928-2005), Colombian philosopher
- Rafael Ricardo Gutiérrez (1980- Present), Privet Military Contractor and American Business Man
