= Charlotte Weidler =

German art dealer, curator and art historian

- Born: 1895; Berlin, Germany
- Died: 1983 (aged 87–88); New York City, New York, U.S.
- Occupations: art dealer, curator
- Known for: Pivotal role in bringing major works of German expressionism to the United States and the resulting restitution claims concerning the collections of Paul Westheim and Alfred Flechtheim

Charlotte Weidler (1895–1983) was a German art dealer, curator and art historian. Her dealings concerning artworks from the collections of Paul Westheim and Alfred Flechtheim during the Nazi–era have been the focus of several high-profile lawsuits.

== Early activities ==
Weidler was born in Berlin and dealt in modern art. Initially a close friend of the German Jewish art collector and editor of Das Kunstblatt, Paul Westheim, she later betrayed him. The exact nature of her actions regarding Westheim's art collection has been the subject of much controversy, generating lawsuits, book and articles and speculation as to her motivations.

== Curator at the Carnegie Institute of Art ==
Weidler began working as a curator for the Carnegie Institute in Pittsburgh while she was still in Berlin and continued after she emigrated to the United States in 1939, traveling between the two countries for work. She made the acquaintance of the Pittsburg steel magnate G. David Thompson and helped him build his collection. selected art to acquire and was responsible for bringing numerous important artworks into American museums. Reputed to be an important expert in German modern art. Weidler's correspondence with the Carnegie is considered to provide "unique insight and detail about the situation of artists in Nazi Germany" and that her exchanges with Carnegie president Homer St. Gaudens are "an extraordinary source of information for provenance researchers about the location of artwork pre-war and the changing attitude towards modern art in Germany as the Nazis rose to power.".

== Controversies and lawsuits ==
Weidler's friend, the Jewish art collector Paul Westheim, fled Nazi Germany for Paris in 1933, leaving his important art collection in Weidler's care. After initially helping him, she cut off contact and, at end of World War II, told Westheim that his paintings had been lost or destroyed. However, this turned out to be false, as after Westheim's death Weidler began selling his paintings. Eventually someone recognised one of Westheim's paintings and informed his surviving family, who sued Weidler. In 2013, Westheim's stepdaughter, Margit Frenk, filed suit in the New York Supreme Court against a Manhattan art gallery, the owner of which was acting as executrix of Weider's estate, demanding the gallery return four paintings, as well as over 3 million dollars earned from the sale of a fifth; the paintings included Max Pechstein's "Portrait of Paul Westheim" and a watercolor by Paul Klee. in 2018, the New York Supreme Court ruled against Frenk, stating that a legal release signed in 1974 by Mariana Frenk-Westheim, Westheim's widow, abandoning the right of her or her heirs to sue Weidler, prevented Margit Frenk from bringing suit against Weidler. Frenk appealed the ruling, but the case was dismissed in 2019.

Weidler also claimed that the famous German Jewish dealer Alfred Flechtheim bequeathed paintings to her, but this assertion was also contested in several lawsuits. In 2009, the family of the deceased artist Georg Grosz filed a claim against the Museum of Modern Art for the return of three paintings that Weidler had sold to the museum; Weilder countered that Alfred Flechtheim, Grosz's art dealer, had gifted them to her. The Grosz family criticized Weidler's account as false, submitting evidence that the paintings had transited through a Dutch auction house, Mak Van Waay, known for dealing in looted art.

Some historians have tried to explain Weidler's actions as the result of a frustrated love affair with Westheim.

Weidler also played a role in dealing with the property of the photographer (Else) Neulander Simon. Persecuted as a Jew, Simon was "forced to hand the (photography) studio over to her friend Charlotte Weider.” Simon was deported to the concentration camp at Majdanek-Lubin and died in 1944.

== Notable artworks ==
Notable works that Weidler sold as her own include George Grosz' work, Portrait of the Poet Herrmann-Neisse (1927); Self-Portrait with a Model; and Republican Automatons.
