= Antonio Alatorre =

Mexican writer, philologist and translator

- Born: Antonio Alatorre Chávez; July 25, 1922; Autlán, Jalisco, Mexico
- Died: October 21, 2010 (aged 88); Mexico City, Mexico
- Education: Universidad Nacional Autónoma de México
- Occupations: Philologist, literary critic, translator, novelist
- Spouse: Margit Frenk (divorced in 1975)
- Writing career
- Language: Spanish
- Notable work: Los 1001 años de la lengua española
- Notable awards: National Prize for Arts and Sciences 1998

Antonio Alatorre Chávez (July 25, 1922 – October 21, 2010) was a Mexican writer, philologist and translator, famous due to his influential academic essays about Spanish literature, and because of his book Los 1001 años de la lengua española (The 1001 Years of the Spanish Language).

== Early years ==
Antonio Alatorre was born in Autlán de la Grana, Jalisco. He studied Latin, Greek, French and English during his youth. He studied law at first, but switched to studying literature at the National Autonomous University of Mexico (UNAM) and philology at El Colegio de México (Colmex), where he met Margit Frenk. He studied in France and Spain with professors such as Raymond Lebergue and Marcel Bataillon.

== Career ==
He was the director of the Linguistics and Literature Studies Center of El Colegio de México from 1953 to 1972, when he edited and directed the Nueva Revista de Filología Hispánica. He taught since 1943 and participated in conferences and courses in several countries.

Alatorre won the National Prize for Arts and Sciences in the Linguistics and Literature category in 1998. He was appointed as a member of El Colegio Nacional on June 26, 1981, and as an honorary member of the Academia Mexicana de la Lengua in September 2001.

== Personal life ==
Alatorre was married to the philologist Margit Frenk; they had 3 children and divorced in 1975. He died in Mexico City on October 21, 2010.

== Journals ==
In addition to the Nueva Revista de Filología Hispánica (NRFH), Alatorre edited the literary journal Pan (Guadalajara, 1945) which he founded with the poet Juan José Arreola, Historia Mexicana (El Colegio de México, 1952–1959), was the co-director of the Revista Mexicana de Literatura (1958–1960) and participated in Diálogos and Nexos.

== Books ==
- El apogeo del castellano. Fondo de Cultura Económica. México.
- Enigmas ofrecidos a la casa del placer de Sor Juana Inés de la Cruz (edición comentada). El Colegio de México.
- Ensayos sobre crítica literaria. Centro Nacional para la Cultura y las Artes (CNCA).
- Juana de Asbaje de Amado Nervo (Introducción y edición). CNCA.
- Los 1001 años de la lengua española. 3a. ed. México: Fondo de Cultura Económica. 2002.
- El sueño erótico en la poesía española de los siglos de oro. México: Fondo de Cultura Económica, 2003.
- Sor Juana Inés de la Cruz, Obras completas, t. I, 2a ed. (Introducción, edición y notas). México: FCE, 2009.

== Translations ==
- Bataillon, Marcel. Erasmo y España. Estudios sobre la historia espiritual del siglo XVI, translation from French corrected by Antonio Alatorre. Fondo de Cultura Económica. México, 1950. (The second edition was published in Madrid in 1964.)
- Curtius, E. R. Literatura europea y Edad Media Latina (two volumes), translated from German by Antonio Alatorre and Margit Frenk. Fondo de Cultura Económica. México, 1975.
- Chevalier, Francois. La formación de los latifundios en México, translated from French by Antonio Alatorre. Problemas Agrícolas e Industriales de México. México, 1956. Fondo de Cultura Económica. México, 1976.
- Freire, Paulo. Cartas a Guinea-Bissau. Apuntes de una experiencia pedagógica en proceso, translated from Portuguese by Antonio Alatorre. Siglo XXI. Madrid, 1977.
- Gerbi, Antonello. La disputa del Nuevo Mundo 1750–1900, second edition, corrected, prologue and translated by Antonio Alatorre, Fondo de Cultura Económica. México, 1983.
- ————————. La naturaleza de las Indias Nuevas (de Cristóbal Colón a Gonzalo Fernández de Oviedo), translated by Antonio Alatorre. Fondo de Cultura Económica. México, 1978.
- Highet, G. La tradición clásica. Influencias griegas y romanas en la literatura occidental (two volumes), translated from English by Margit Frenk and Antonio Alatorre. Fondo de Cultura Económica. México, 1954.
- Humphreys, Robert Arthur. William Robertson y su historia de América, translated by Antonio Alatorre. Instituto Panamericano de Geografía e Historia, 1958.
- King, Willard F. Juan Ruiz de Alarcón, letrado y dramaturgo. Su mundo mexicano y español, translated and edited by Antonio Alatorre. El Colegio de México. 1989.
- Lacan, Jacques. De la psicosis paranoica en su relación con la personalidad, translated from French by Antonio Alatorre, Siglo XXI, 1976.
- Las "Heroidas" de Ovidio y su huella en las letras españolas, translated into Spanish and notes by Antonio Alatorre. UNAM. México, 1950. (A new edition, with "lots of corrections" was published by Mexico's Secretariat of Public Education in 1987.)
- Machado de Asís, J. M. Memorias póstumas de Blas Cubas, translated from Portuguese by Antonio Alatorre. Fondo de Cultura Económica. México, 1951.
- Pereida Graáa Aranha, José. Canáan, translation and notes by Antonio Alatorre. Fondo de Cultura Económica. México, 1954.
- Rodríguez, José Honorio. Historiografía del Brasil, siglo XVI, translation from Portuguese by Antonio Alatorre. Instituto Panamericano de Geografía e Historia, 1957.
- ————————. Historiografía del Brasil, siglo XVIII, translation from Portuguese by Antonio Alatorre. Instituto Panamericano de Geografía e Historia, 1963.
- Sapir, Edward. El lenguaje. Introducción al estudio del habla, translated from English by Margit Frenk and Antonio Alatorre. Fondo de Cultura Económica. México, 1954. (Later, eight editions of this book were published.)
- Sarrailh, Jean. La España ilustrada de la segunda mitad del siglo XVIII, translated from French by Antonio Alatorre. Fondo de Cultura Económica. México, 1957.
- Varios autores. Portugal en revolución, translated from Portuguese by Antonio Alatorre. Siglo XXI, 1977.
- Warren, Howard Crosley, Diccionario de psicología, translated by Antonio Alatorre, E. Imaz and L. Alaminos, 3rd. ed. Fondo de Cultura Económica. México, 1948.
- Wedgwood, Cicely Verónica. Guillermo el taciturno. Guillermo de Nassau, Príncipe de Orange, 1533–1584, translation by Antonio Alatorre and J. Díez-Canedo. Fondo de Cultura Económica. México, 1947.
- Williams, George H. La Reforma radical, translated from English by Antonio Alatorre. Fondo de Cultura Económica. México, 1983.
- Zavala, Silvio. Programa de historia de América en la Época colonial, translated by Antonio Alatorre. Instituto Panamericano de Geografía e Historia, 1961.

== Bibliography ==
- Solana, Fernando (2006). Educación: visiones y revisiones México, Siglo XXI, ISBN 968-23-2647-8. Web page search made on December 6, 2009.
