= Consuelo Sáizar =

Mexican editor and public servant

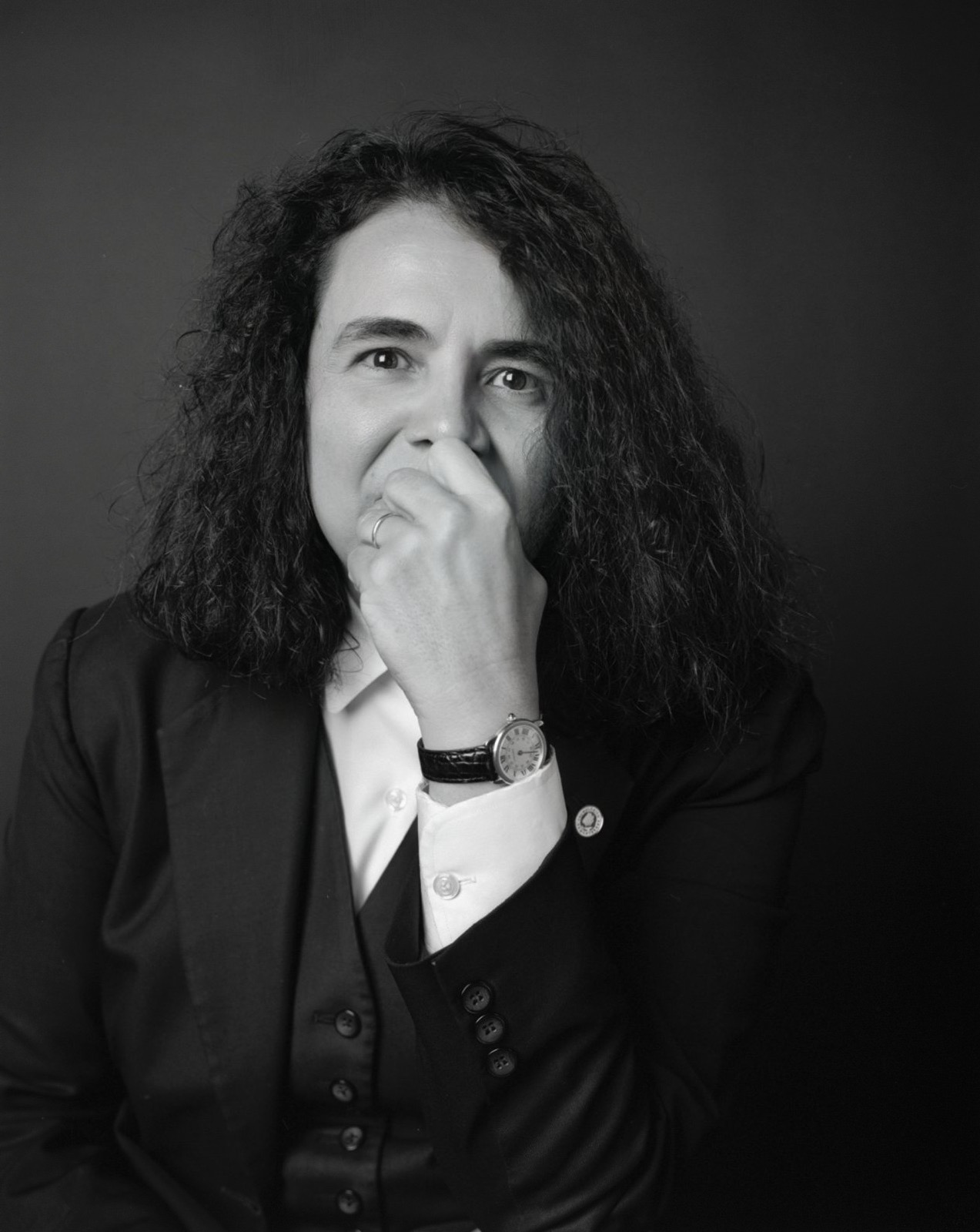

President of the National Council for Culture and the Arts
- In office 3 March 2009 – 30 November 2012
- President: Felipe Calderón
- Preceded by: Sergio Vela
- Succeeded by: Rafael Tovar y de Teresa

Personal details
- Born: Roxana del Consuelo Sáizar Guerrero; 1961 (age 64–65) Acaponeta, Nayarit, Mexico
- Education: Universidad Iberoamericana (BA); Clare College, Cambridge (MPhil, PhD); Harris Manchester College, Oxford (MSt)

Roxana del Consuelo Sáizar Guerrero (Acaponeta, Nayarit, 1961) is a book editor, consultant for cultural content companies, sociologist of culture, and former Mexican public servant. She has founded and directed publishing companies since the mid-1980s. She served as general director of the Fondo de Cultura Económica (FCE), president of the National Council for Culture and the Arts (CONACULTA), and of the Regional Center for the Promotion of Books in Latin America and the Caribbean (Cerlalc). During 2022, she was the general director of the Monterrey International Book Fair.

== Biography and career ==
She began her professional career as press chief of Fonapas between 1978 and 1979; during that period, she was also a reporter and editor for the newspaper El Observador de Nayarit in Tepic, Nayarit.

In 1983, she entered the publishing world as general manager of Editorial Jus until 1990, when, in partnership with Gerardo Gally, she founded Hoja Casa Editorial, a company she directed until April 2002.

She was general director of the Fondo de Cultura Económica (FCE) from May 2002 to March 2009. During this period, the publication of women’s literature gained greater importance, she founded the digital library, and new Cultural Centers were built that house bookstores, auditoriums, and various cultural activities; several others were also renovated.

Under her direction, new collections were created at the FCE and new bookstores were opened in various cities of the Mexican Republic, for example, the Centro Cultural Bella Época located in the Condesa neighborhood of Mexico City.

Her administration also had an international scope with the construction of the FCE Cultural Center Gabriel García Márquez, inaugurated in 2008 in Bogotá, Colombia; the remodeling of the Juan Rulfo Bookstore in Madrid, Spain; and the Arnaldo Orfila Bookstore project in Buenos Aires, Argentina. In addition, the nine branches of the Fondo located in their respective countries became distributors of Mexican publishing houses, extending their reach.

Many were Sáizar’s contributions to the Mexican publishing industry while she held that position: the Fund’s average annual editorial production grew from 1,234,086 copies to 4,056,579 copies; a large part of the publisher’s catalog was reprinted; the logo was redesigned with a fresher brand identity, the “Fondo” typographic family specific to the group was designed, and paper with a watermark bearing the FCE logo was produced; in addition, the Virtual Library was launched and the necessary preparations were made to begin the digital publishing department at the Fondo; and as a special mention, the FCE obtained ISO 9001-2000 certification for the warehouse, the publishing house, the library, and the bookstores.

Her leadership and achievements at the FCE earned her the appointment as president of CONACULTA in March 2009, a position she held until December 2012. As a public servant, she developed high-impact projects such as La ciudad de los libros, a profound renovation of the Biblioteca México José Vasconcelos in Mexico City.

Shortly afterward, in February 2010, she was unanimously elected president of Cerlalc, the Regional Center for the Promotion of Books in Latin America and the Caribbean, an intergovernmental organization under the auspices of UNESCO based in Bogotá that works to improve conditions for the development of reading societies, a responsibility Sáizar held until November 2012.

Subsequently, she assumed the general direction of the Monterrey International Book Fair, from March 2022 to November 2023, one of the most emblematic cultural projects of the Tecnológico de Monterrey. Since January 2026, Sáizar has been a full member of the Academia Hispanoamericana de Ciencias, Artes y Letras in seat A.

In September 2026, Sáizar published El Aleph digital. Del libro impreso a la lectura total, an essay released by Tusquets Editores in its Tiempo de Memoria series. Drawing on her experience as a reader and editor, the book examines the impact of digital technologies on publishing and reading. It also explores the growing participation of women in the publishing industry and the evolution of reading formats and access to published content.

== Education and recognitions ==
Consuelo Sáizar holds a bachelor’s degree in Communication Sciences from the Universidad Iberoamericana (1983), where she also pursued studies in Political Science and Public Administration (1990). She holds a master’s degree in Modern Societies and Global Transformations from the University of Cambridge in England (2015). She studied a master’s degree in Intellectual History at the University of Oxford (2021) and a PhD in Sociology at the University of Cambridge (2021), in England.

== Awards ==
In 2000, she received the Editorial Art Award from the National Chamber of the Mexican Publishing Industry (CANIEM). Three years later, the Government of the Kingdom of Spain awarded her the decoration of the Order of Civil Merit, in the rank of Grand Cross Officer. In 2008, she received the Emilia Ortiz Medal, which the state of Nayarit grants to its distinguished citizens.

She received the Cultural Merit Medal from the Government of Colombia and the “Mont Blanc” Woman of the Year trophy in 2010. The following year, she was awarded the decoration of the Order of Bernardo O’Higgins from the Government of Chile.

In 2017, she was decorated by the Secretariat of National Defense, by the Academia Nacional A.C., and the National Academy of History and Geography with the Grand Order Victoria de la República.

She was considered one of “The 300 Leaders” by Líderes Mexicanos magazine, consecutively from 2003 to 2012. Forbes México recognized her as one of the “50 Most Powerful Women in Mexico” in 2011 and she was named one of the “50 people who move Mexico” in 2011 and 2012 by Quién magazine.

== Body ob work ==
- She is co-author of the book Gritos y Susurros, coordinated by Denise Dresser.
- She is a columnist for Opinión 51.
- La industria de la memoria: la necesidad de preservar archivos y bibliotecas (2020).
- Facing the Digital Reading Disruption: a Personal Account of Mexican Poetry Mobile Applications (2020).
- Gandhi, la cartografía de la memoria (2020).
- Nuevas dimensiones y retos para el lenguaje: los tiempos de emoticones y emojis (2020).
- Galería Arvil, 50 años (2019).
- Alí Chumacero: entre Cenzontle y Tezontle (2018).
- La B como epicentro de la Ñ. El ‘boom’ y su impacto en el mundo editorial (2018).
- La economía de los talentos debe profesionalizarse (2018).
- La Nación: espejo intelectual de una acción política nacional (2016).
- Cómo querer a Denise Dresser (2014).
- La cartografía de la memoria: bibliotecas digitales (2013).
- María Isabel Grañen Porrúa: filántropa, bibliófila, escritora e investigadora (2013).
- Bibliotecas personales: la primera gran hazaña cultural del siglo XXI mexicano (2012).
- Homenaje a un artista de excepción: Ricardo Legorreta (2012).
- Mexicana universal (2012).
- El Aleph digital. Del libro impreso a la lectura total (2026)
