= Margit Frenk =

German-Mexican philologist, folklorist and translator (1925–2025)

- Frenk in 2015
- Born: Margarita Ana María Frenk y Freund; August 21, 1925; Hamburg, Germany
- Died: November 21, 2025 (aged 100); Mexico City, Mexico
- Education: Bryn Mawr College; University of California, Berkeley; El Colegio de México
- Occupations: Philologist, folklorist, translator
- Spouse: Antonio Alatorre (divorced in 1975)
- Writing career
- Language: Spanish
- Notable awards: National Prize for Arts and Sciences 2000

Margarita Ana María Frenk y Freund (21 August 1925 – 21 November 2025), sometimes known by her married name Margit Frenk Alatorre or as Margit Frenk Freund, was a German-Mexican philologist, folklorist and translator born in Hamburg, Germany. She was a member of the Mexican Academy of Language from 1993 until her death. She was also a Doctor Honoris Causa at the National Autonomous University of Mexico (UNAM).

== Life and career ==
Frenk's Jewish parents moved the family from Germany to Mexico in 1930 as the Nazis gained power. Her mother was Mariana Frenk-Westheim, a writer of Spanish-Mexican prose, hispanist, lecturer in literature, museum expert and translator. Her father was Ernst Frenk, a physician. After he died, Frenk's mother remarried, to Paul Westheim, another German Jewish refugee.

In 1946, she spent some time at Bryn Mawr College in the United States on a scholarship, studying English literature and Spanish theater of the 16th century. This was followed by a few years at the University of California, Berkeley, where she taught Spanish, learned Italian and studied Spanish literature.

After obtaining her MA, she returned home to study at the Colegio de México, where she was a professor and researcher from 1950 to 1980, except for a brief stay in Paris to attend classes by Marcel Bataillon. She was a collaborator on the Nueva Revista de Filología Hispánica (NRFH), which was managed by Raimundo Lida and, later, by Antonio Alatorre, whom she married. Beginning in 1958, she was the coordinator for a group of researchers who, between 1975 and 1985, produced the five-volume Cancionero folklórico de México ("Mexican Folk Songbook").

She was a professor at UNAM from 1966 where, in 2000, she founded the Revista de Literaturas Populares, which she continued to edit, and she was a member of the scientific committee on the Spanish academic journal Paremia. From 1986 to 1996, she was coordinator of the Center for Literary Studies at the Institute for Philological Research at UNAM, where she founded the magazine Literatura Mexicana. She was also an honorary president of the Asociación Internacional de Hispanistas.

In 2000, she won the National Prize for Arts and Sciences in the Linguistics and Literature category. In 2006, she won the Alfonso Reyes International Prize and, in 2009, the 23rd Menéndez Pelayo International Prize.

In 2013, Frenk sued the executrix of Charlotte Weidler's estate, Yris Rabenou Solomon, in New York County Supreme Court for paintings that had belonged to her stepfather, Paul Westheim. The paintings included a Paul Klee watercolor and Max Pechstein’s "Portrait of Paul Westheim". Westheim had entrusted the paintings to Weidler when he fled Nazi Germany, and when he wanted to recover them, Weidler had claimed, falsely, that they had been destroyed in the war. "Much of the case hinged on a 1973 release through which Frenk’s mother, Marianna, relinquished claims to all the artworks in Westheim’s collection. Margit claimed that the release was fraudulently induced because Weidler had kept secret the whereabouts of Westheim’s holdings." The case was dismissed in 2019.

Frenk died in Mexico City on 21 November 2025, at the age of 100.

== Selected works ==
- Lírica Hispánica de Tipo Popular: Edad Media y Renacimiento, Universidad Nacional Autónoma de México (1966)
- Estudios Sobre Lírica Antigua. Castalia (1978) ISBN 84-7039-270-0
- Entre Folklore y Literatura, El Colegio de México (1984) ISBN 968-12-0258-9
- Cancionero de Romances Viejos, Universidad Nacional Autónoma de México (1984) ISBN 968-837-217-X
- Charla de Pájaros o Las Aves en la Poesía Folklórica Mexicana, UNAM (1994) ISBN 968-36-3939-9
- Lírica Española de Tipo Popular, Cátedra (2001) ISBN 84-376-0096-0
- Poesía Popular Hispánica: 44 estudios, Fondo de Cultura Económica (2006) ISBN 968-16-7368-9
- Estudios de Lingüística, El Colegio de México (2007) ISBN 968-12-1308-4.
