= Patrick Johansson =

Patrick Johansson may refer to:

- Patrick Johansson (historian) (born 1946), French-Mexican researcher
- Patrick Johansson (bandy) (born 1963), Swedish bandy player
