= Brazil, 1964–1985: The Military Regimes of Latin America in the Cold War =

2017 academic book of military history

Brazil, 1964-1985: The Military Regimes of Latin America in the Cold War
- Author: Herbert S. Klein, Francisco Vidal Luna
- Series: Yale-Hoover Series on Authoritarian Regimes
- Publisher: Yale University Press
- Publication date: 2017
- ISBN: 978-0-300-22331-6 (Hardcover)

Brazil, 1964–1985: The Military Regimes of Latin America in the Cold War is a book by historians Herbert S. Klein and Francisco Vidal Luna published by Yale University Press in 2017.

== Synopsis ==
The book starts off with looking at Latin America as a whole, and how the region was being converted to a dictatorship one country at a time. They also focus on looking at what the different countries' dictatorships were doing differently from one another in regards to oppression and laws being put into effect.

The next section focuses entirely on the politics of the military dictatorship in Brazil. This section of the book touched on the different laws and the oppression of the public under the dictatorship. This chapter explained the different measures that the dictatorship tried to put into effect to take complete control over the country, such as in the enactment of AI-5 or the disbanding of all the other political parties. The government also imposed step wage cutting measures for the working class, and disbanded or completely got rid of almost all of the workers unions. The last section of the book examines the social reforms that the military government put into effect, or that they updated the already in place procedures. This chapter references Getúlio Dornelles Vargas's regime and wrote about the overhauling he did to the public health, healthcare, pension plans, and a little in education. Klein and Luna argue that Vargas's regime laid the ground work for the military regimes of Brazil to come in and improve the very weak social and public health school systems so they could improve the countries very weak enrollment rate, health standards and illiteracy rate of Brazil.

== Critical reception ==
Review by Luis Roniger in The Americas 75 (2018): 241-242.
