= Alfonso Rangel Guerra =

Mexican lawyer, educator, writer and administrator (1928–2020)

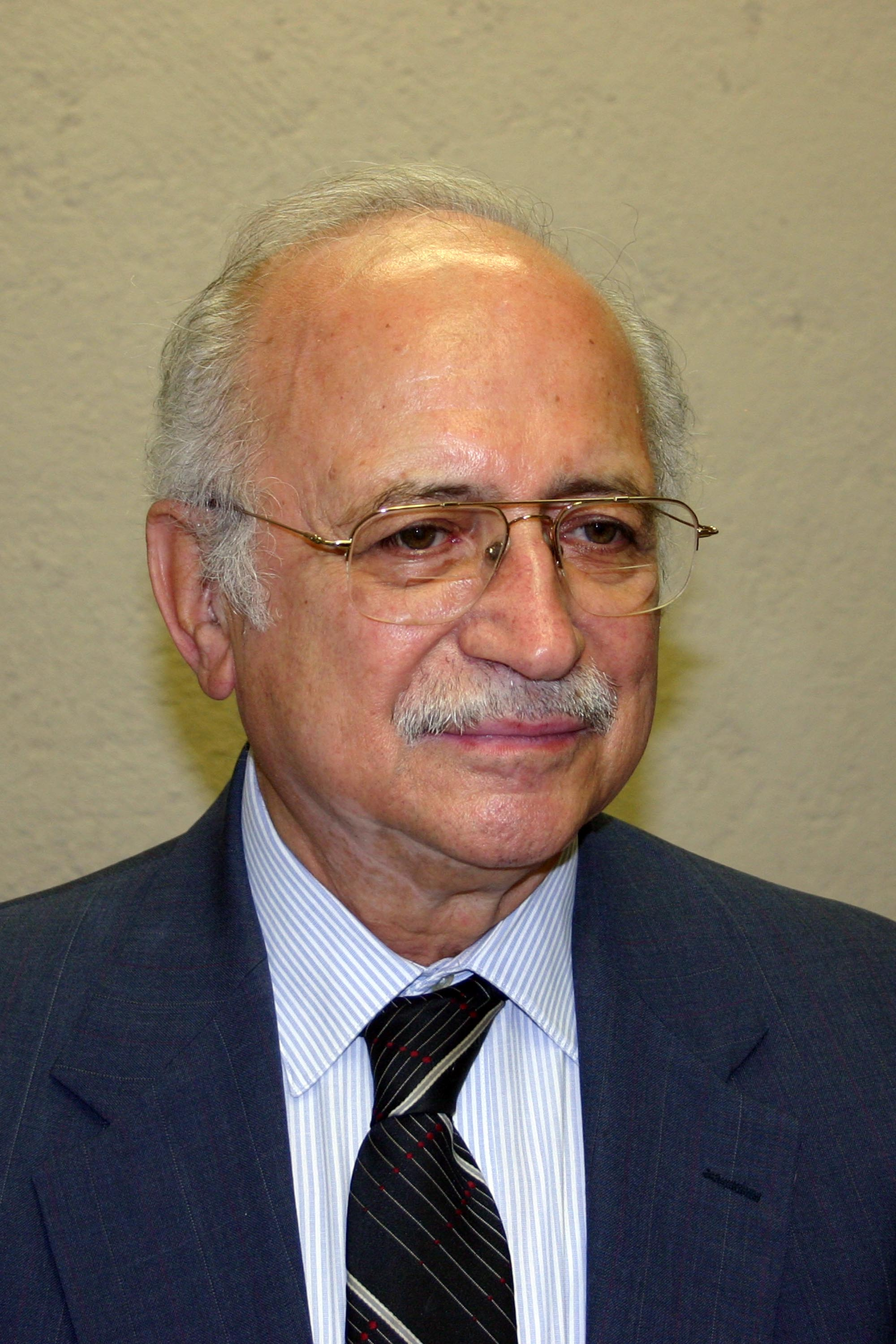
Alfonso Rangel Guerra in 2009

Alfonso Rangel Guerra (16 November 1928 – 6 May 2020) was a Mexican lawyer, educator, writer and administrator.

== Life and career ==
Alfonso Rangel Guerra was born in Monterrey, Nuevo León. He received his law degree from the Autonomous University of Nuevo León (UANL) in 1953. From 1958 to 1959, he had a scholarship which enabled him to study French literature at the Instituto Francés de América Latina and the Sorbonne. He served as Rector at UANL from 1962 to 1964, and was latterly the Director of UANL's Center for Humanistic Studies. Over the years, he held many professorships and administrative positions there. He twice served as the Secretary of Education and Culture for the state of Nuevo León (1988-1991, 1996-1997).

Outside his home state, he was the Executive Secretary of the National Association of Universities and Higher Education Institutions (ANUIES) (1965–67); Director General of Higher Education for the Secretariat of Public Education (1978-1982); Cultural Attaché at the Mexican Embassy in Spain (1983–85) and Secretary General of the College of Mexico (1985–88).

Rangel Guerra died on 6 May 2020, at the age of 91.

== Honors and awards ==
- 1989: Became a corresponding member of the Academia Mexicana de la Lengua
- 2007: Doctor Honoris Causa at the Autonomous University of Baja California (UABC)
- 2009: Alfonso Reyes International Prize

== Selected works ==
- La Educación Superior en México, El Colegio de México (1979) ISBN 968-12-0001-2
- Las Ideas Literarias de Alfonso Reyes, El Colegio de México (1993) ISBN 968-12-0414-X
- La Cuarta Presencia: Ensayos, Castillo (1995) ISBN 968-7415-27-4
- Universidad y Humanismo, Fondo Editorial de Nuevo León (2009) ISBN 607-7577-38-3
- La Opacidad y la Transparencia, Pendola (2010) ISBN 607-90991-1-X
