= Alí Chumacero =

Mexican poet, translator, literary critic and editor

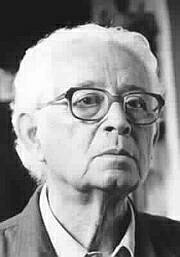
- Alí Chumacero in 2006
- Born: 9 July 1918
- Died: 22 October 2010 (aged 92)
- Occupations: Poet; translator; literary critic; editor
- Writing career
- Notable awards: Xavier Villaurrutia Award (1984); National Prize for Arts and Sciences (1987)

Alí Chumacero Lora (9 July 1918–22 October 2010) was a Mexican poet, translator, literary critic and editor. He was a member of the Mexican Academy of Language.

== Biography ==
Alí Chumacero Lora was born on July 9, 1918, in Acaponeta, Nayarit. His family moved to Guadalajara, where Chumacero studied from primary school to high school. In 1937 he went to Mexico City planning to study Philosophy and Literature at UNAM, but he could not immediately enroll due to having failed some courses in high school. He was living with an aunt and sharing a room with four people, and used the time to read and explore the city.

In 1940, while studying at the university, he founded the magazine Tierra Nueva, along with Jorge González Durán, Leopoldo Zea y José Luis Martínez, which was in circulation until 1942. In this publication the authors sought to balance the spontaneity of modern literature with the rigor of academic literary studies.

He married in 1949 with Lourdes Gómez Luna and the couple had five children.

He died in Mexico City from pneumonia in 2010, aged 92.

== Career ==
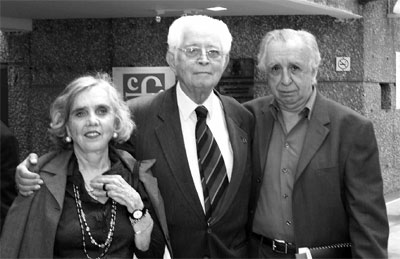
Alí Chumacero (center) with Elena Poniatowska, and Vicente Leñero, in 2005

Between 1952 and 1953, Chumacero received scholarships for the Colegio de México and for the Mexican Center of Writers. He became a member of the Mexican Academy of Language in 1964. He was a director of the Fondo de Cultura Económica.

He worked as an editor of various publications, starting as joint editor of Tierra Nueva magazine from 1940 to 1942 and going on to edit Letras de México, El Hijo Pródigo and La cultura en México (a cultural supplement to the Mexican newspapers Novedades and Ovaciones).

== Works ==
Chumacero's works include:

- Desert of Dreams (Páramo de sueños) (1944)
- Exiled Images (Imágenes desterradas) (1948)
- Words in Rest (Palabras en reposo) (1956)
- The critical moments (Los momentos críticos)

== Awards and recognition ==
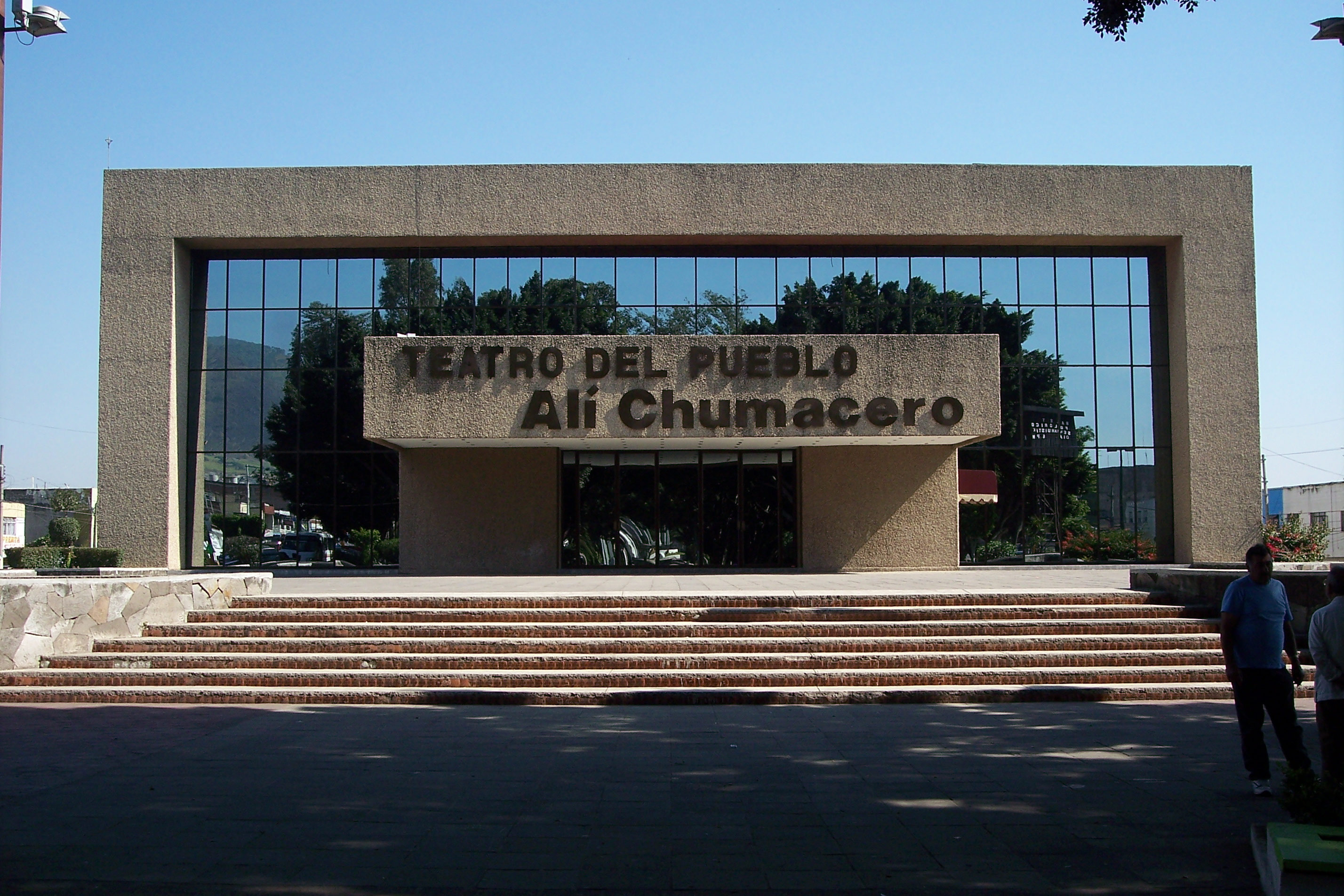
Ali Chumacero People's Theater, in Tepic

- Xavier Villaurrutia Award (1984)
- Alfonso Reyes International Prize (1986)
- National Arts and Sciences Award (Linguistics and Literature) (1987)

In 2008 he received a homage in the Palacio de Bellas Artes on the occasion of his 90th birthday, attended by some of his friends such as Carlos Montemayor, and Eduardo Lizalde.

The Ali Chumacero People's Theater was inaugurated in 1987 in Tepic, and is the most important cultural venue in the state of Nayarit.
