= Yva =

German photographer

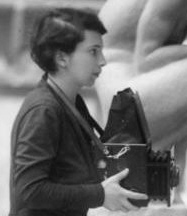
- Yva, 1930
- Born: Else Ernestine Neuländer; 26 January 1900; Berlin, German Empire
- Died: 31 December 1944 (aged 44); Lublin, German-occupied Poland
- Other names: Else Ernestine Neuländer-Simon, Else Simon
- Occupation: photographer
- Years active: 1920–1942
- Known for: multiple exposure fashion photography

Yva (26 January 1900 – disappeared June 1942?; officially declared dead on 31 December 1944) was the professional pseudonym of Else Ernestine Neuländer-Simon who was a German Jewish photographer renowned for her dreamlike, multiple exposed images. She became a leading photographer in Berlin during the Weimar Republic.

When the Nazi Party came to power, she was forced into working as a radiographer. She was deported by the Gestapo in 1942 and murdered, probably in the Majdanek concentration camp during World War II.

== Early life ==
Else Ernestine Neuländer was born on 26 January 1900 in Berlin as the youngest child of a Jewish merchant and a milliner. Her father died when she was twelve and her mother supported the nine siblings with her hatmaking. Neuländer probably was a student at the Lettehaus of Berlin, and completed her schooling and a six-month internship to learn her craft.

== Career ==
In 1925, Neuländer established her own photographic studio using the professional pseudonym Yva in a favorable location, near the avenue of Kurfürstendamm. In 1926, she had a brief collaboration with the painter and photographer Heinz Hajek-Halke, but due to a copyright dispute, they severed their partnership. Her brother, Ernst Neuländer, was a co-owner of the modeling salon Kuhnen and he hired her to shoot his models. She was able to publish ten photographs in Die Dame in 1927, which served as a breakthrough to the top fashion magazines of the day. She embraced the modernist approach using technical composition and avant-garde imagery, both capturing the sexual revolution of the period and emphasizing the female form in ungendered ways, which allowed her flexibility as an artist. Her decision to enter the field was itself a challenge to the accepted norm of the day, which saw men as artists and women as their passive models.

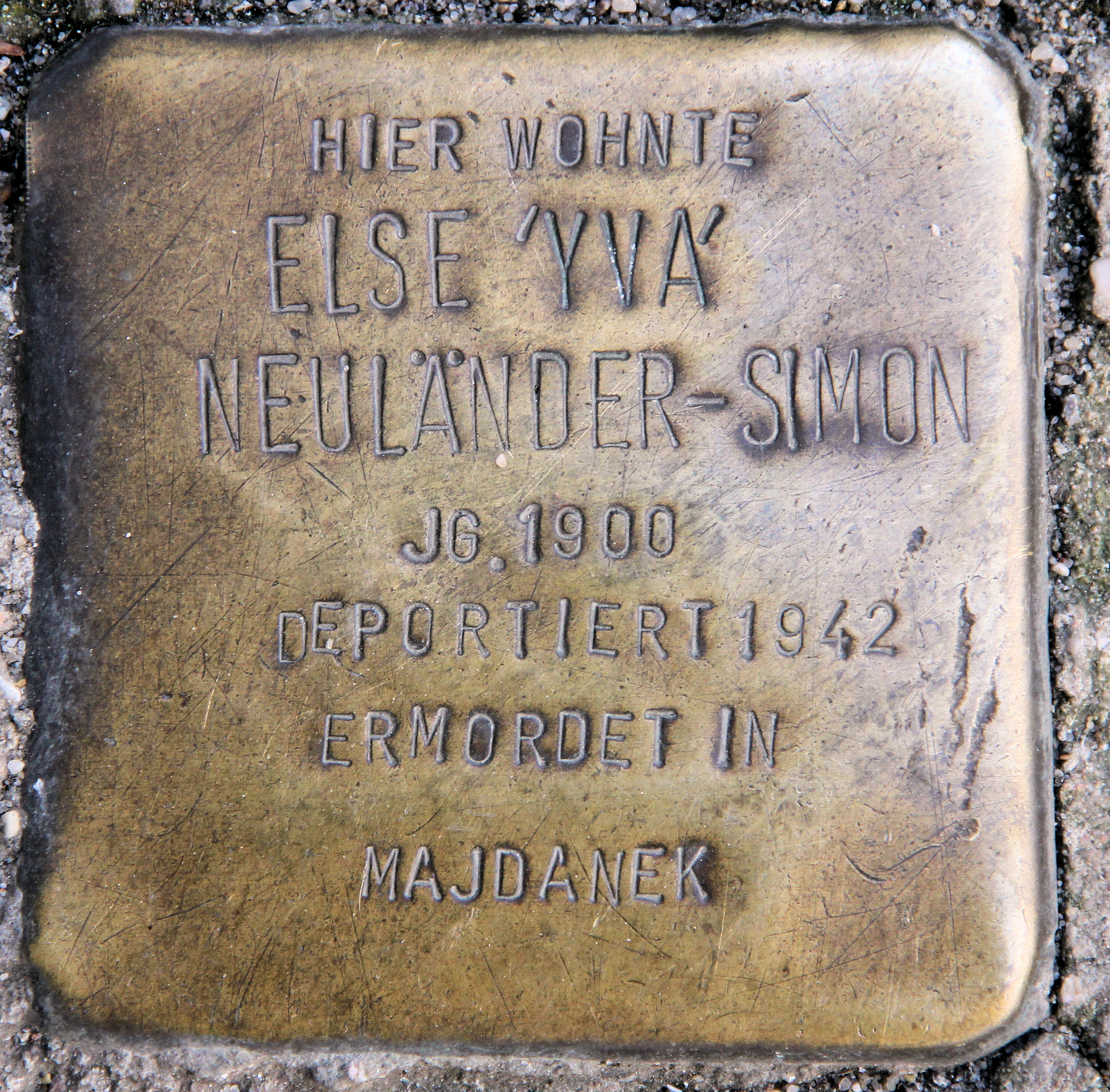
paving block on Schlüterstraße No. 45 for Else Neuländer-Simon

By 1927, Yva had become known for specializing in fashion, nudes, and portraiture, but increasingly she recognized the commercial aspects for photography and was one of the first professionals who worked in advertising. One such ad was a campaign done for "Amor Skin" which used multiple exposures of the film, to create dreamlike, surrealist images. Within a short time, she had establish a reputation for her innovative imagery and became a contributor to magazines, photographic journals and periodicals including Berliner Illustrirte Zeitung, Die Dame, the fashion magazine Elegant Welt, and Gebrauchsgraphik. She also participated in international exhibitions, including the 1929 "Film und Foto" exhibit in Stuttgart, the 1930 Das Lichtbild exhibit held in Munich, the 1932 First International Biennial of Photographic Art (Italian: Biennale Internazionale d'Arte Fotografica) held in Rome and then in 1933, she participated in both the annual international Parisian salon of nude photography La Beauté de la femme and the London Royal Photographic Society′s "The Modern Spirit in Photography" exhibition.

Yva was represented by Schostal Photo Agency (Agentur Schostal) From 1929 Yva's photographic "stories" appeared in the Ullstein Verlag′s Uhu Magazine. She had been contracted to produce 27 montages, but only 20 appeared before the magazine was forced to close. The photo strips told in action sequence the story of young women arriving from the provinces to the Berlin metropolis to seek their fortunes and represent a technical step between static pictures and motion picture films. In 1933, even though the Nazi Party began shutting down Jewish owned businesses and published her name on a list of undesirables, Yva decided to expand her business. In part, the ambiguity of the Nazi policies, her assimilation into the non-Jewish community, and her employment of ten assistants who were not Jewish, led Yva to a false sense of safety. She did not experience anti-Semitism from her advertising and fashion clients, and first moved to a larger studio on Bleibtreustraße before relocating again the following year to Schlüterstraße, shortly after her marriage. In 1934, she married Alfred Simon, who gave up his own career to manage the business aspects of Yva's firm.

Yva hired a young assistant, Helmut Neustädter in 1936, who would later become the well-known fashion photographer Helmut Newton. That same year, she Aryanized her firm and transferred ownership to her friend, the art historian Charlotte Weidler, to enable the business to continue operations. Yva made plans to emigrate, after receiving an offer of employment from Life to work in New York City. Her husband convinced her to abandon the plan and remain in Germany, hoping that things would improve, because he could not envision starting over in a new place in which he didn't even speak the language. Simon had guessed wrong, as in 1938 Yva was banned from practicing photography by a new series of regulations and forced to close her studio. She worked as an assistant in the radiography department of the Jewish Hospital of Berlin until 1942. Some efforts were made in 1942 for the couple to leave Germany, as after their arrest 34 crates of their belongings, most full of her photographic furnishings, were identified at the Hamburg port. Twenty-one of the crates were destroyed in a bombing and the other 13 were auctioned to offset the costs of their storage.

Else and Alfred Simon were arrested by the Gestapo on 1 June 1942 and on 13 June were sent via "15 Osttransport" to the extermination camps. Their transport was supposed to go to the Sobibór extermination camp, but on the way the train was moved to a side track at Lublin, Poland and 1030 prisoners were selected to go on to Sobibór. The remaining prisoners (how many remains unclear) were sent to the Majdanek concentration camp. No transport lists for this deportation have clarified the whereabouts of the couple, though the Jewish Registry at Yad Vashem shows Alfred Simon was murdered at Majdanek. No record of Yva's death has surfaced. It is probable that both of them were murdered upon arrival at a camp, probably in 1942. Else Ernestine Neuländer was officially declared dead on 31 December 1944 and Stolpersteine were placed outside her last home at Schlüterstraße 45 on 29 November 2005.

== Legacy ==
In 2001, a retrospective of Yva's work was featured at the Hidden Museum (German: Das Verborgene Museum) in Charlottenburg. The following year, her photographs were featured in an exhibit at the Stadtmuseum Berlin. In 2002, Yva: Photographies 1925–1938, a biography and evaluation of her work and contributions to photography was written by Marion Beckers and Elisabeth Moortgat and published in German and English by Wasmuth Publishing.

== Photo gallery ==
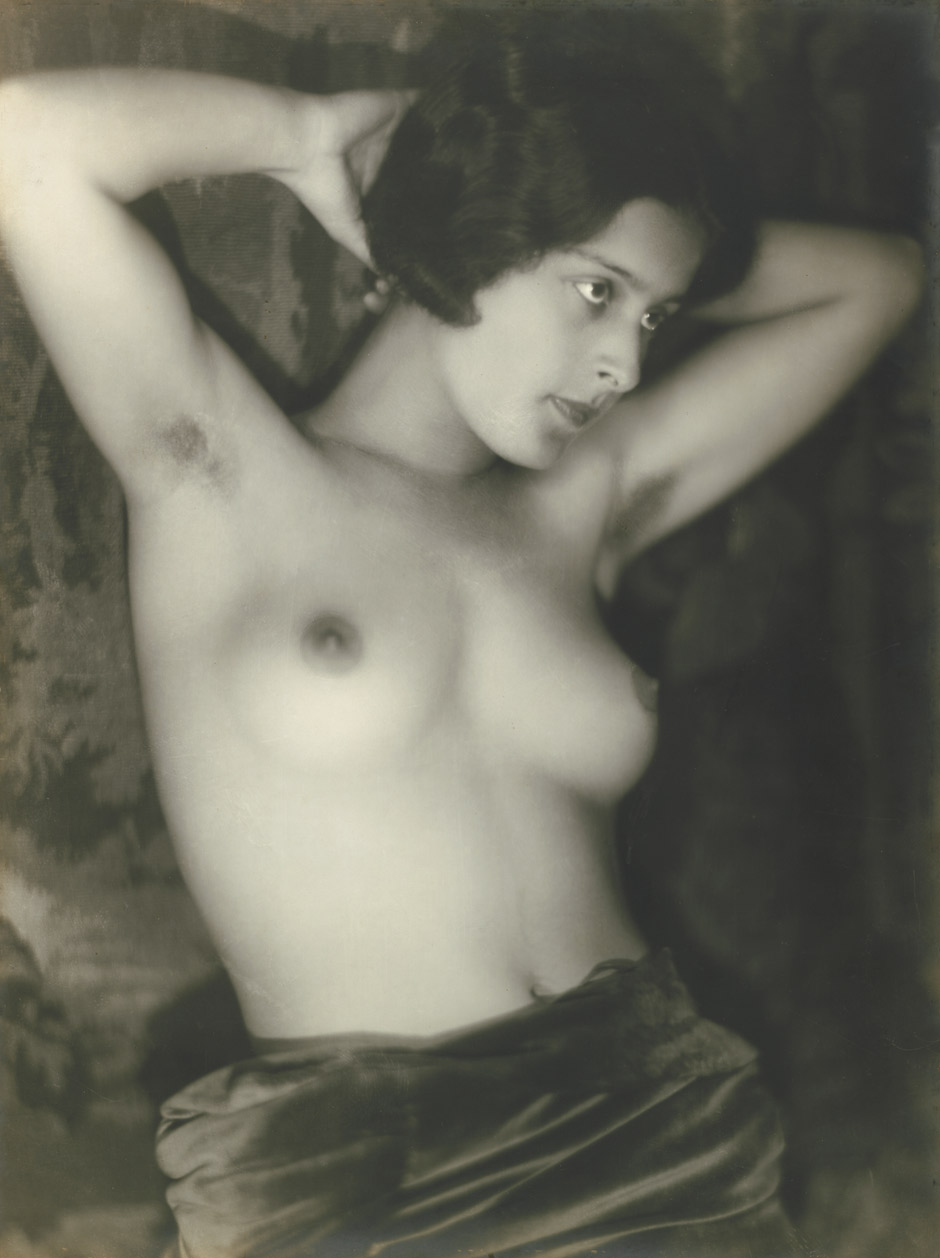
Female semi-nude 1920s

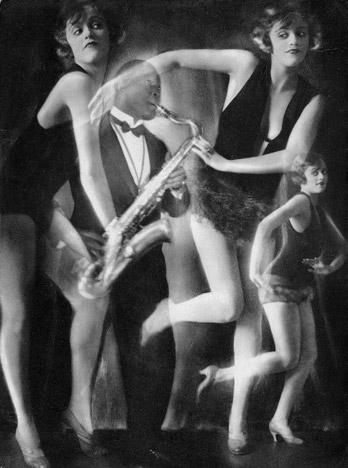
Charleston 1926-1927

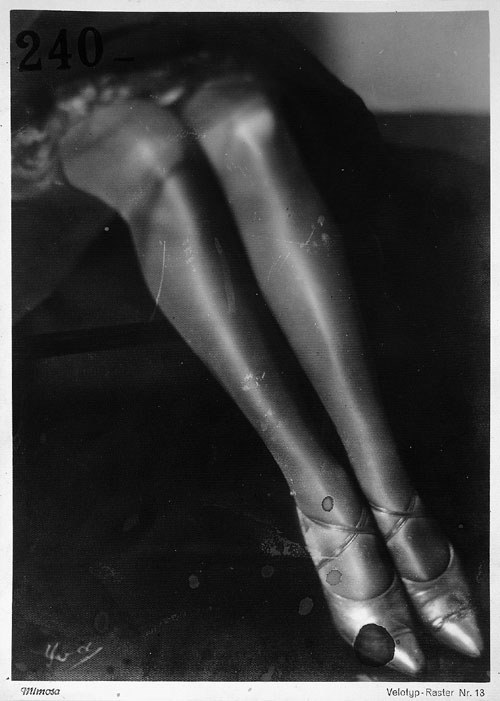
Legs 1927-1928

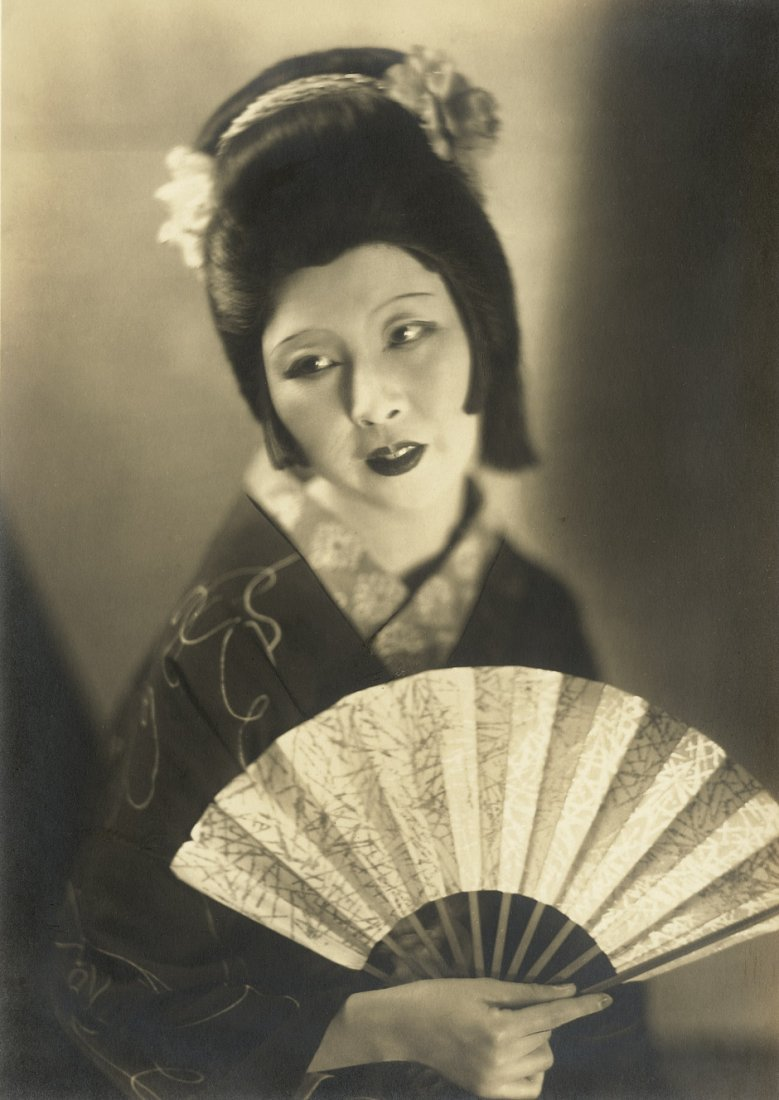
The Japanese dancer Takebayashi 1929

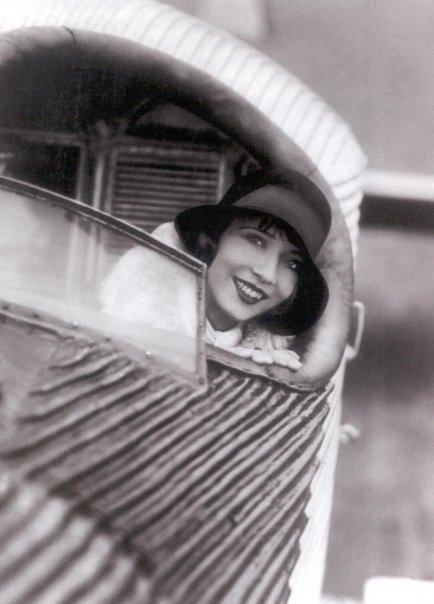
Ramona in the little flying machine 1929

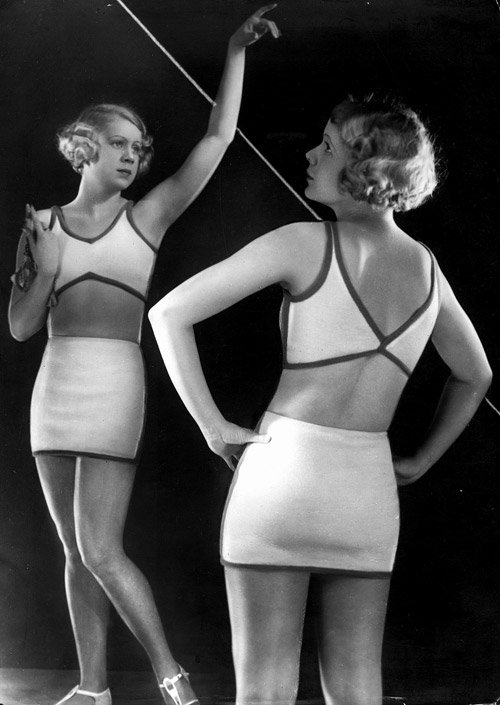
Bathing Suit Model Schenk ca. 1930

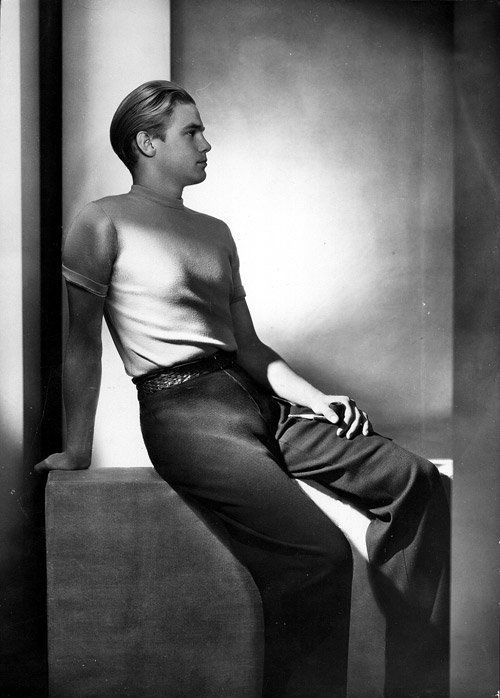
Fashion Model Jantzen ca. 1932

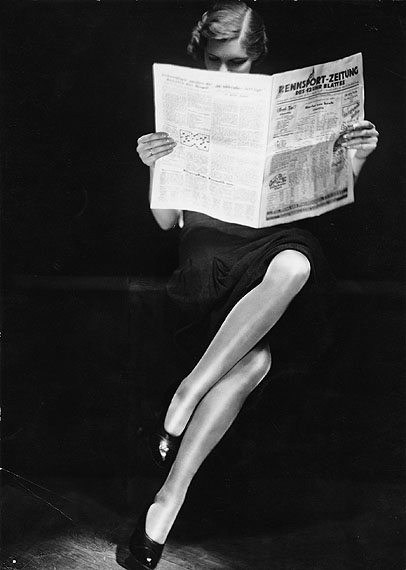
Lady reading newspaper ca. 1932

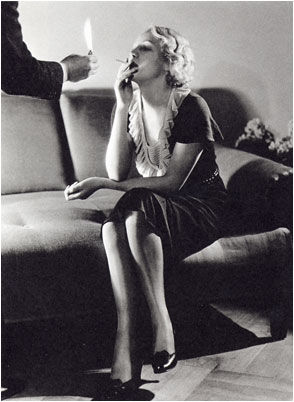
Untitled (Smoking) ca. 1932

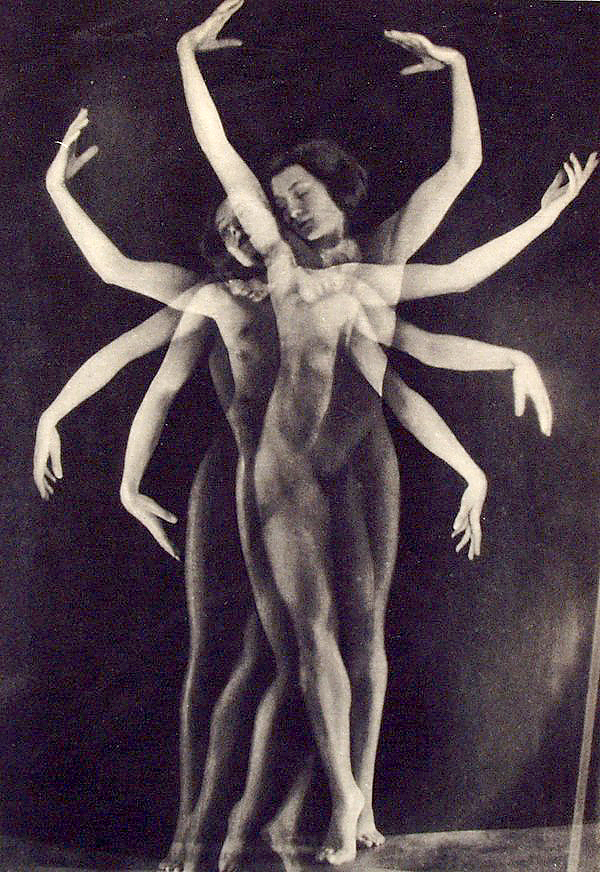
Danse ca. 1933

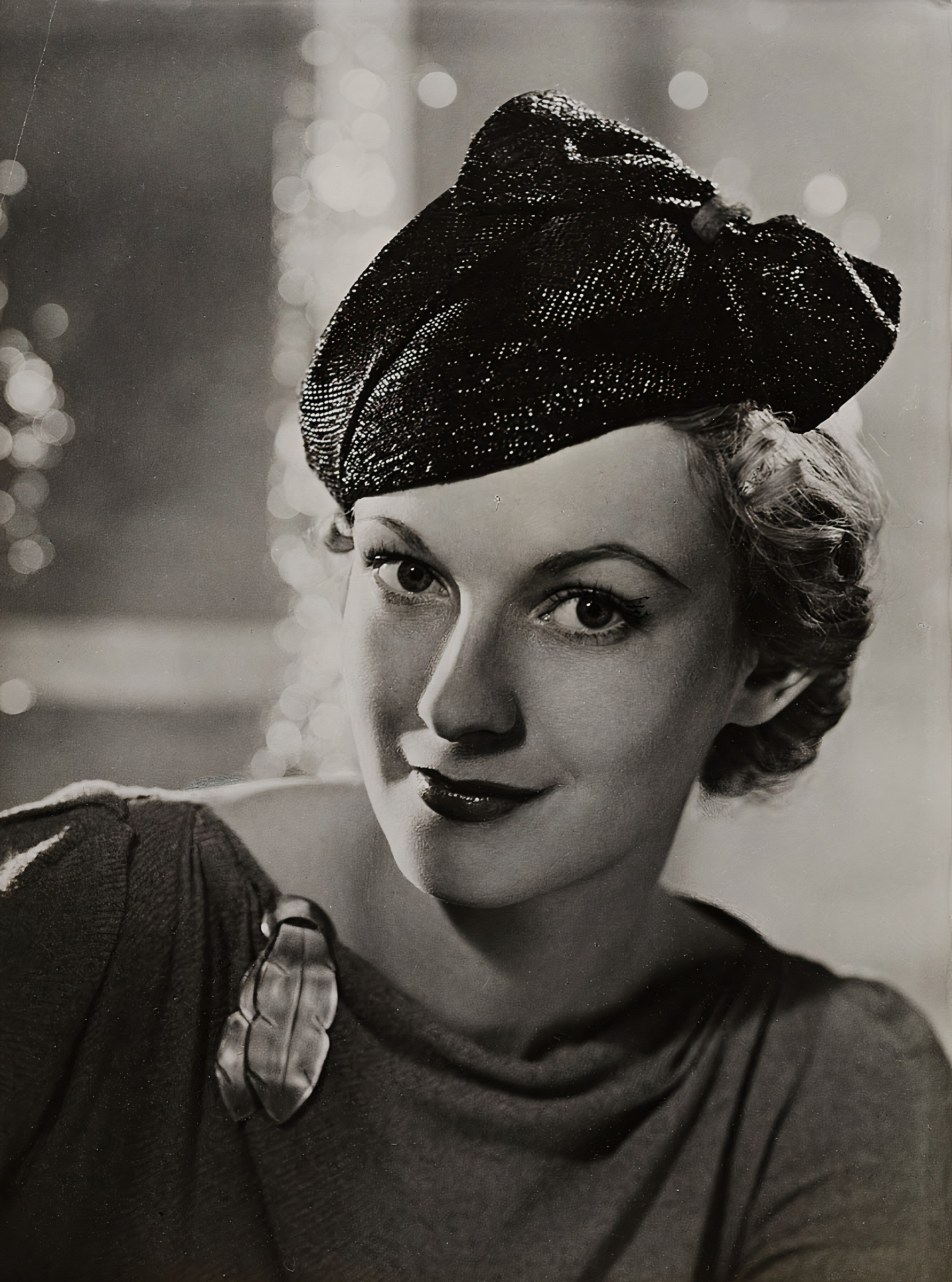
Karin Stilke modeling for Yva

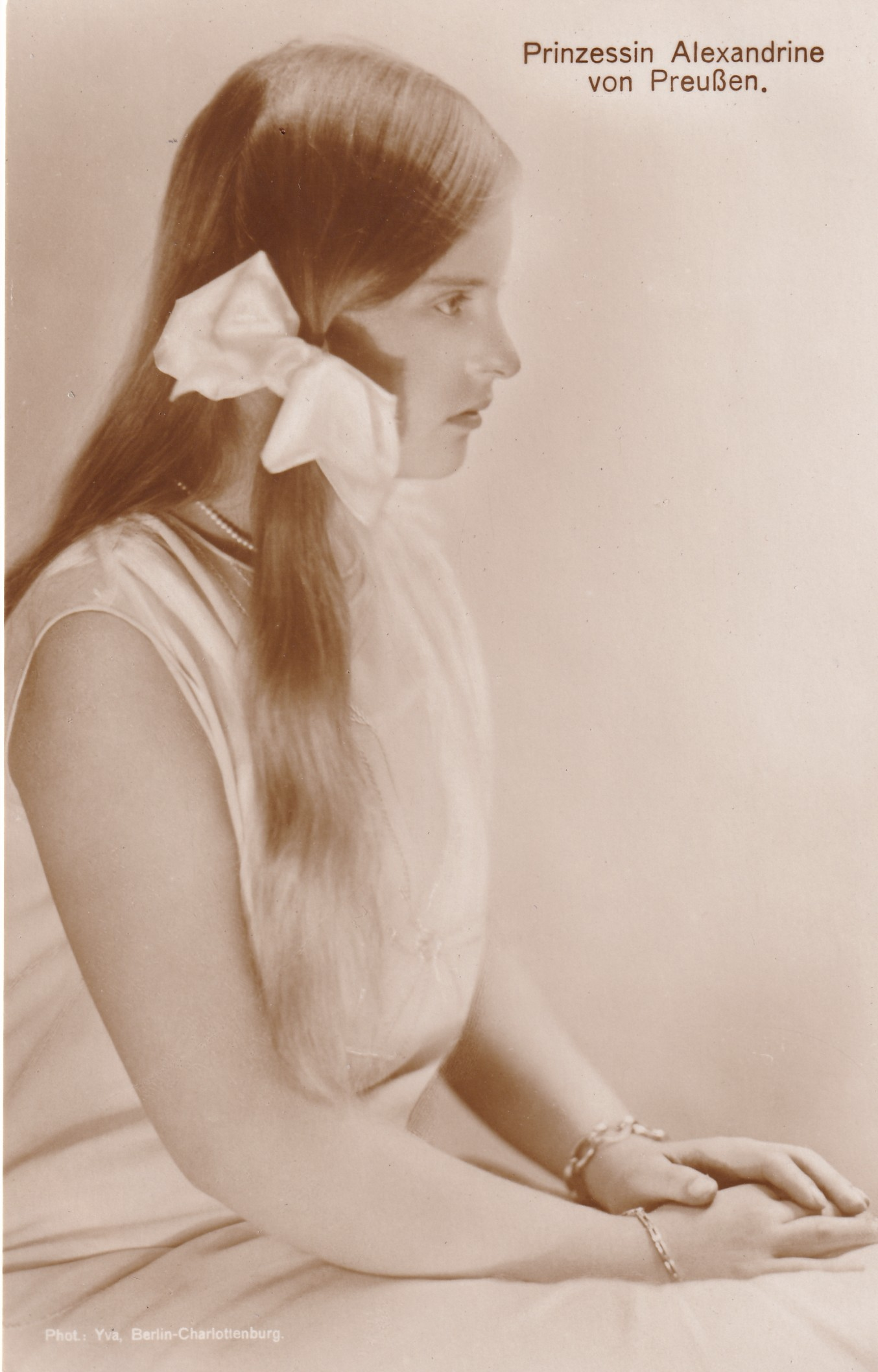
Princess Alexandrine of Prussia, 1930
