= Paul Westheim =

German Historian

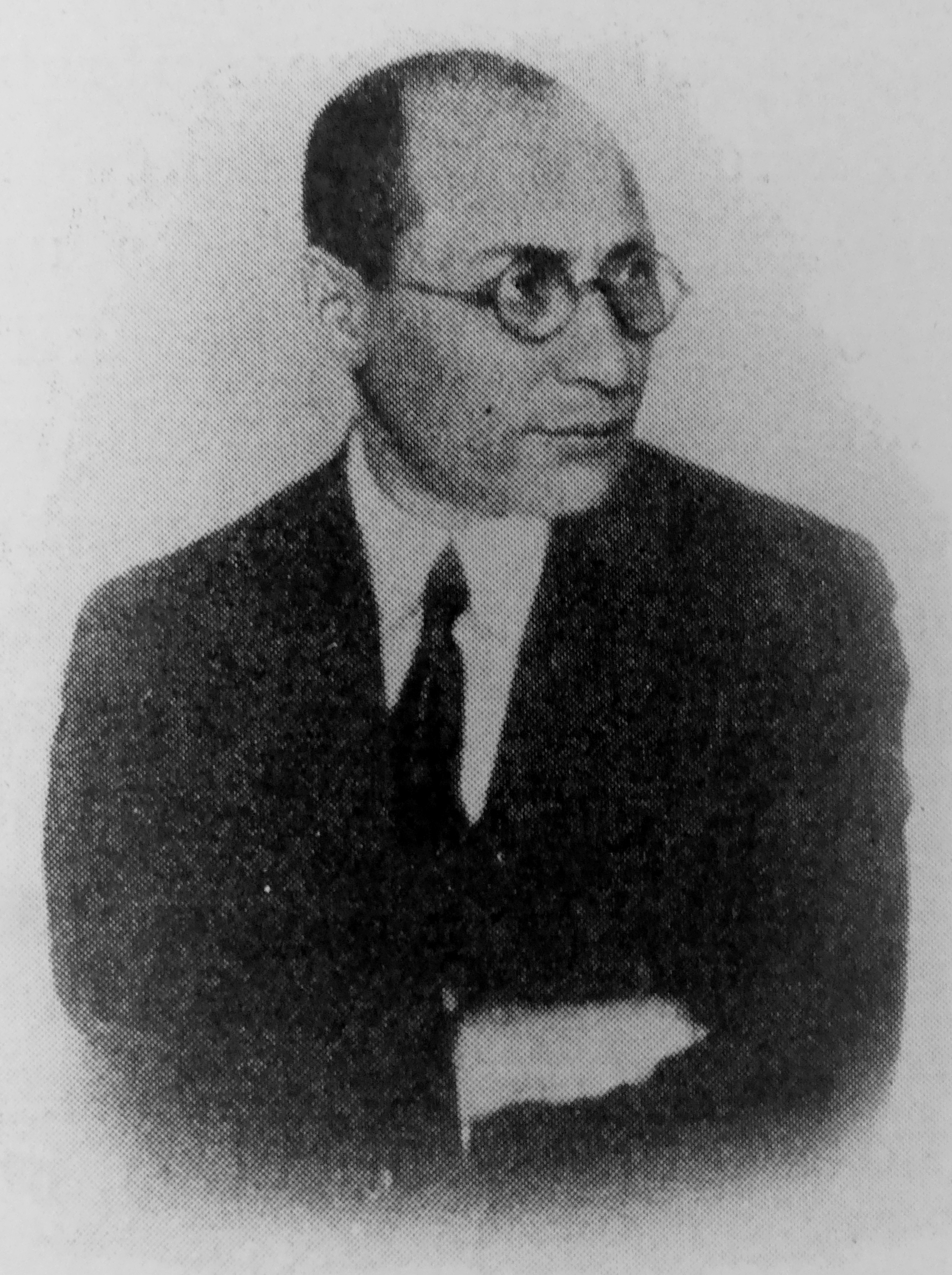
- Born: 7 August 1886; Eschwege, German Empire
- Died: 21 December 1963 (aged 77); East Berlin, East Germany
- Occupation: Art historian

Paul Westheim (7 August 1886 in Eschwege, Germany – 21 December 1963 in East Berlin, East Germany) was a German art historian and publisher of the magazine Das Kunstblatt. The fate of Westheim's art collection, which was sold after his death by Charlotte Weidler, has been the subject of major art restitution lawsuits.

== Biography ==
Paul Westheim's exhibition catalog in German of 135 illustrations by Oskar Kokoschka was published in 1925 by the Paul Cassirer Verlag in Berlin

Born into a Jewish family Westheim studied art history at the Technische Universität Darmstadt and then, in 1906, at the Humboldt University of Berlin where he was taught by Heinrich Wölfflin and Wilhelm Worringer. Westheim published monographs on Oskar Kokoschka, Wilhelm Lehmbruck, and Mexican sculpture.

Westheim was the founder and editor of the important German arts magazine, Das Kunstblatt which was published monthly from 1917 to 1932, ceasing to appear when Westheim fled the Nazis.

=== Nazi persecution, internment, flight to Mexico ===
When the Nazis came to power in Germany in 1933, Westheim was persecuted because he was Jewish. He fled to France in 1933 (Paris). His German citizenship was stripped from him in 1935. From September 1939, he was interned as an enemy alien in several French camps, including Gurs. He was freed in late 1941 with the help of friends and the American Emergency Rescue Committee. From Marseille he moved to Spain, Portugal and ultimately Mexico.

In Mexico from 1941 until his death in 1963, he established himself as a leading authority on Mexican art, both ancient and modern. He met Mariana Frenk, a German Jewish writer and translator whose husband, physician Ernst Frenk had died, and married her.

=== Paul Westheim's Art Collection ===
Before the rise of Hitler, Paul Westheim had gathered an important art collection of German Expressionists. When he fled Nazi Germany, he entrusted the care of his art collection to his friend Charlotte Weidler. Weidler told Westheim the artworks had been destroyed; however she began selling them as her own after his death.

=== Lawsuit for restitution ===
In 2013, Westheim's daughter Margit Frenk, sued the Yris Rabenou Gallery; its owner, Yris Rabenou Solomon; her husband, David Solomon; and their sons, Darius and Teimour Solomon, in New York County Supreme Court for the return of at least four paintings and $3.6 million for a fifth one she says the gallery sold. The paintings included a Paul Klee watercolor and Max Pechstein's “Portrait of Paul Westheim.”

The complaint stated:

“After the conclusion of World War II, Weidler had led Westheim to believe that his art collection had been lost or destroyed during the war, and she broke off communications with him. Following the war, Weidler shipped artworks from the Westheim Collection that had in fact survived the war to New York and fraudulently concealed them from Westheim. After Westheim’s death in 1963, Weidler began to sell artworks from the Westheim Collections.”

Six years of court battles ensued. In 2019, the Appellate Division of the New York Supreme Court ruled in favor of art dealer and collector Yris Rabenou Solomon and her family. David Rowland, the attorney who represented Margit Frenk criticised the ruling, saying, “It’s a horrible decision, and it really is a miscarriage of justice. It undermines the rule of law because it favors the alleged thief above the true owner, who in this case was a Nazi victim searching for his collection.”

== Paul Westheim's archives ==
Paul Westheim's archives, stolen in Paris by the Germans, then seized by the Soviets, are currently kept in Moscow.

== Publications ==
- Das Kunstblatt
- El grabado en madera
- The sculpture of ancient Mexico = La escultura del México antiguo
- Paul Westheim, Die Frauenausstellung. Ein Nachwort, Kunst und Handwerk: Zeitschrift für Kunstgewerbe und Kunsthandwerk, Vol. 62, Nr 9, 1911/1912, page 274
- Paul Westheim, Ausstellung, “Die Frau in Haus und beruf” in Zoologischen Garten, Kunstgewerbeblatt, Vol,. 23 Nr 7 April 1912, page 142–143
- Paul Westheim, Oskar Kokoschka : das Werk Kokoschkas in 135 Abbildungen. Paul Cassirer Verlag, Berlin, 1925

== Bibliography ==
Malcolm Gee, ″Defining the modern art collector in the Weimar years″, in: Geschmacksgeschichte(n): öffentliches und privates Kunstsammeln in Deutschland, 1871–1933, eds. U. Wolff-Thomsen, and S. Kuhrau, Kiel, Verlag Ludwig, 2011, 115–130.

Malcolm Gee, ″The 'cultured city': the art press in Berlin and Paris in the early twentieth century″, in Printed Matters: Printing, Publishing and Urban Culture in Europe in the modern period, eds. M. Gee and T. Kirk, Ashgate, 2002, 150–173.

Malcolm Gee, "The Berlin Art World, 1918–1933" in: Malcolm Gee, Tim Kirk and Jill Steward (eds), The City in central Europe : culture and society from 1800 to the present, Ashgate, 1999.

Melissa Müller, Monika Tatzkow, Lost Lives, Lost Art: Jewish Collectors, Nazi Art Theft, and the Quest for Justice, 2010, Vendome Press, ISBN 978-0-86565-263-7
