= Cortesian documents =

Cortésian Documents Mexico, June 21, August 16, and October 5, 1526

The Cortesian documents are a compilation by José Luis Martínez of handwritten historical texts related to Hernán Cortés. The documents are divided into three parts:

- those Cortés wrote himself
- those written by others in his name or by commission
- reports about facts that interested him.

The documents span a long period from 1518 to 1548, a year after his death.

Two letters dated in 1526 which mention the expedition to the Hibueras (today Honduras). These letters are under protection of the Center for the Study of Mexican History of the Foundation Carlos Slim.

== Historical context of the document ==
In the letters, Cortés relates the expedition to the Hibueras (Honduras), trip that kept him out of New Spain from 12 October 1524 to 19 June 1526. The trip was made to protect the novohispana border that was threatened by other countries. Also it was important for Cortés find a channel from the Atlantic Ocean to the Pacific Ocean that would facilitate the trade routes.

However, the absence of Cortés caused some chaos in the New Spain in 1525. False reports of his death generated abuses from the government managers, who took Cortés' goods, pursued his friends and family, and abused the natives. This events contributed to the dismissal of Hernán Cortés.
