= José Luis Martínez Rodríguez =

Mexican politician

José Luis Martínez Rodríguez (1918–2007) was a Mexican academic, diplomat, essayist, historian, bibliographer and editor. He was the director of the Fondo de Cultura Económica from 1977 to 1982 and professor of literature with the Faculty of Philosophy and Letters at the National Autonomous University of Mexico (UNAM).

== Career ==
José Luis Martínez Rodríguez was born in Atoyac, Jalisco, in 1918.

He became an Academic Numerary of the Academia Mexicana de la Lengua in 1960. From 1980 to 2002 he was the Director and, in 2003, was named Honorary Director in perpetuity. He was also a numerary at the Academia Mexicana de la Historia (Chair 28), beginning in 1993, and a corresponding member of the Academia Peruana de la Lengua and the Academia Dominicana de la Lengua. From 1965 to 1970 he was Director general of the Instituto Nacional de Bellas Artes (INBA).

In addition to his academic posts, he served as Mexico's representative at UNESCO for the year 1963–64 and was ambassador to Greece from 1971 to 1974.

In the 1982 general election, he was elected to the Chamber of Deputies for Jalisco's 14th district as a member of the Institutional Revolutionary Party (PRI).

Among the many awards and honors he received were the National Prize for Arts and Sciences (Premio Nacional de Ciencias y Artes) for Literature and Linguistics, the Alfonso Reyes International Prize (Premio Internacional Alfonso Reyes), the Menéndez Pelayo International Prize, the Spanish Civil Order of Alfonso X, the Wise and the French Legion of Honor. In 1967, he became a Commander of the Order of Merit of the Italian Republic.

His personal library was one of the largest in Mexico; it has been preserved in the National Library.

=== Director of the Fondo de Cultura Económica ===
During his 1977–1982 leadership of the Fondo de Cultura Económica, over 700 new titles were published and he created the Revistas Literarias Mexicanas Modernas collection, which reprinted, in facsimile editions, the most important literary magazines published in Mexico during the first half of the twentieth century. He also worked on rebuilding the general catalog by reissuing 1,084 titles of continuing cultural significance.

== Personal life ==
He was married to dancer Amalia Hernández. They had a son, José Luis Martínez, who was the Mexican ambassador to Hungary.

== Selected works ==
- America Antigua: Nahua, Mayas, Quechuas, Otras Culturas, (El Mundo Antiguo, VI), Secretaria de Educacion Publica (1976) ISBN 968-290-106-5
- El Trato con Escritores y Otros Estudios, Universidad Autonoma Metropolitana (1992) ISBN 970-620-139-4
- La Expresión Nacional: Letras Mexicanas del Siglo XIX, Consejo Nacional para la Cultura y las Artes (1993) ISBN 968-295-309-X
- La Literatura Mexicana del Siglo XX, Consejo Nacional para la Cultura y las Artes (1995) ISBN 968-296-164-5
- Pasajeros de Indias, Viajes Transatlánticos en el Siglo XVI, Alianza (1998) ISBN 84-206-2355-5
- Bibliofilia. (Autobiográfico), FCE (2000) ISBN 968-16-7602-5
- Cruzar el Atlántico, FCE (2004) ISBN 968-16-7361-1
- Nezahualcóyotl: Vida y Obra, FCE (2006) ISBN 968-16-0509-8
- Hernán Cortés, FCE (2006) ISBN 968-16-3330-X
- Documentos Cortesianos (1990), compiler.
