= Mariana Frenk-Westheim =

German-Mexican writer (1898–2004)

Mariana Frenk-Westheim (4 June 1898 – 24 June 2004) was a German-Mexican writer of prose, Hispanist, lecturer in literature, museum curator, and translator from Spanish to German.

Frenk-Westheim, the daughter of Jewish parents, was born in Hamburg and left Germany in 1930 with her husband, physician Ernst Frenk, and two children, and moved to Mexico. After her husband's death she married Paul Westheim, an art historian.

Her most renowned translations are of books by Mexican author Juan Rulfo. In 2002 she published her poems in a volume, "Tausend Reime für Große und Kleime. Die Tier- und Dingwelt alphabetisch vorgestellt". She died in Mexico City at the age of 106.

In 2013, Frenk-Westheim's daughter Margit Frenk sued for the return of paintings from Westheim's art collection, alleging that Charlotte Weidler, to whom they had been entrusted in Nazi Germany, sold them illegally after telling Westheim that they had been destroyed.
