= Daniel Cosío Villegas =

Mexican economist, diplomat, historian and essayist (1898–1976)

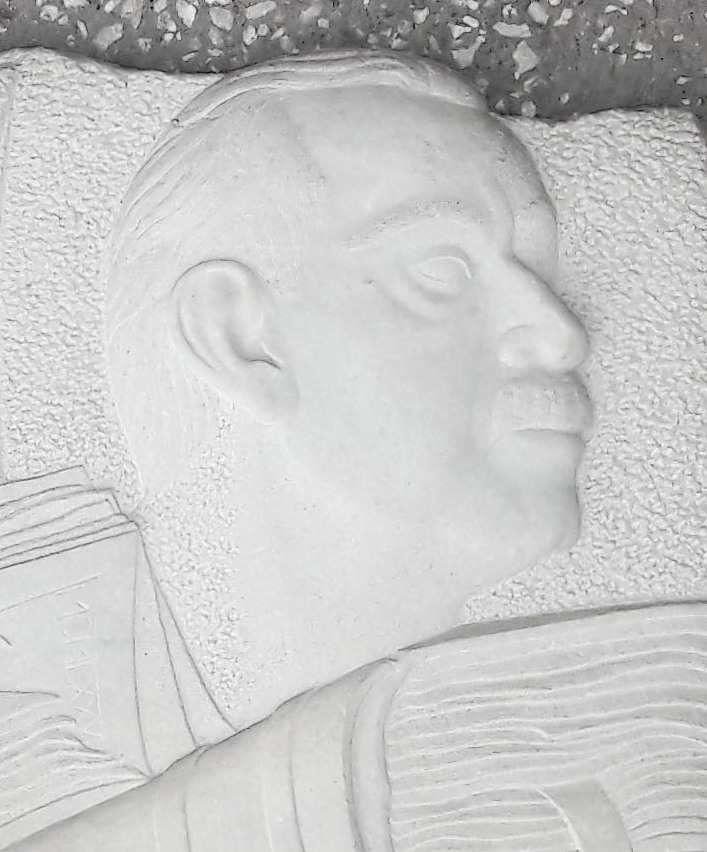
- Artistic relief at the Daniel Cosío Villegas Library
- Born: July 23, 1898; Mexico City, Mexico
- Died: March 10, 1976 (aged 77); Mexico City, Mexico
- Occupations: Historian; Economist; Editor; Diplomat
- Awards: National Prize for Arts (1971)

Academic background
- Education: National Autonomous University of Mexico

Academic work
- Discipline: History

Daniel Cosío Villegas (Spanish pronunciation: [daˈnjel koˈsi.o βiˈʝeɣas]; July 23, 1898 – March 10, 1976) was a Mexican economist, essayist, historian, and diplomat.

== Career and education ==
Cosío Villegas was born in Mexico City.

After studying one year in engineering and two years of philosophy, he received a B.A. in law from the National University and took several courses in economics at Harvard, Wisconsin and Cornell. Later, he received master's degrees from the London School of Economics and the École libre de sciences politiques of Paris.

After working briefly for Excélsior he joined José Vasconcelos in the production of La Antorcha magazine. In 1929, he served as secretary general of the National University, counselor to the Bank of Mexico, director of the School of Economics of the National University (1933–1934), director of El Trimestre Económico and founded the Fondo de Cultura Económica, one of the most renowned publishing companies in Latin America.

On May 7, 1951, he was admitted to El Colegio Nacional and from 1959 until 1963 he chaired El Colegio de México, whose library now bears his name. Simultaneously, he was the Mexican Ambassador to the UN Economic and Social Council and became its president in 1959. He received the National Literature Award in 1971 and in 1976 he published Memorias ('Memoirs').

Several weeks after publishing his memoirs, he died from health compilations, at 77, in Mexico City. He was buried at Panteón Jardín.

== Selected works ==
- La cuestión arancelaria en México ('The Tariff Issue in Mexico', 1932)
- La historiografía política del México moderno ('The Political Historiography Study of Modern Mexico', 1953)
- Porfirio Díaz en la revuelta de La Noria ('Porfirio Díaz in the Riot of La Noria', 1954)
- La República restaurada. La Vida política ('The Restored Republic. The Political Life', 1955)
- Estados Unidos contra Porfirio Díaz ('The United States Against Porfirio Díaz', 1956)
- La Constitución de 1857 y sus críticos ('The 1857 Constitution and Its Critics', 1957)
- El Porfiriato. Vida política exterior ('The Porfiriato. Foreign Political Life', 2 volumes, 1960 and 1963)
- El Porfiriato. La vida política interior ('The Porfiriato. Domestic Political Life', 2 volumes, 1970 and 1973)
- El sistema político mexicano ('The Mexican Political System', 1972)
- La sucesión presidencial ('The Presidential Succession', 1975)
- Historia moderna de México ('Modern History of Mexico', 5 volumes out of 10, 1955 and 1974)
- Memorias ('Memoirs', 1976)
