= Herbert S. Klein =

American historian

- Awards: Alfonso Reyes International Prize (2020); Guggenheim Fellowship (1980)

Academic background
- Education: University of Chicago (BA, PhD)

Academic work
- Discipline: Latin American history
- Institutions: Columbia University

Herbert S. Klein (born January 6, 1936) is an American historian. He is the Gouveneur Morris Professor Emeritus of History at Columbia University.

In February 2020 the El Colegio de México awarded the Alfonso Reyes International Prize to Herbert S. Klein. He also received a Guggenheim Fellowship in 1980. In 2022, Klein served as the curator for the Latin American Collection of the Hoover Institute at Stanford University.

== Bibliography ==
- Brazil, 1964-1985: The Military Regimes of Latin America in the Cold War. Yale University Press. 2017.
- A Concise history of Bolivia. 1,2,3 ed. Cambridge University Press.
