= Arnaldo Orfila Reynal =

Argentine-Mexican publisher

- Born: July 9, 1897; La Plata, Argentina
- Died: January 13, 1998 (aged 100); Mexico City, Mexico
- Education: National University of La Plata
- Spouse: Laurette Séjourné

Arnaldo Orfila Reynal (9 July 1897 – 13 January 1998) was an Argentine-Mexican publisher. Orfila Reynal was director of the Fondo de Cultura Económica (Economic Culture Fund) and its subsidiary in Argentina. In 1965 he founded the publishing house Siglo Veintiuno Editores with the assistance of University of Buenos Aires.
