= Patrick Johansson (historian) =

French-Mexican historian and anthropologist (born 1946)

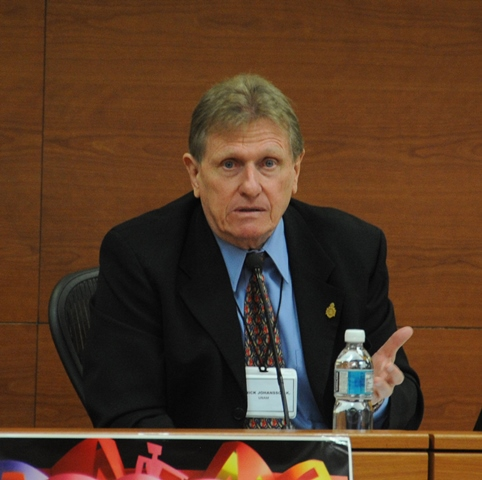
Johansson in 2012

Patrick Johansson Keraudren (born October 23, 1946) is a French-born naturalized Mexican academic, researcher and professor of the Nahuatl language.

Born in Rouen, he holds a Doctor of Letters from the University of Paris. Since 1979, he has been a researcher of the Institute of Historical Research of the National Autonomous University of Mexico (UNAM), and associate professor of Miguel León-Portilla in the Seminario de Cultura Nahuatl. Since 1992, he has taught Nahuatl literature at the Faculty of Philosophy and Letters at the same university.

Since 1995, he has served as academic coordinator of the Permanent Weekly Nahuatl Language and Culture Seminar at the University of Colima, giving lessons and conferences around the state of Colima. He was full professor of Nahuatl Culture and Weekly Bibliographical Research in the Institute of the Palafox Library of Puebla, as well as guest Columbian Literature professor at the Universidad de las Américas Puebla, the Mexican Institute of Tanatology, as well as visiting professor at the universities of Paris-Sorbonne and Toulouse-le-Mirail.

In 2009, Johansson was elected to the Mexican Academy of the Language and, in 2025, he was awarded the Alfonso Reyes International Prize.

== Sources ==
- Milbrath, Susan Heaven and Earth in Ancient Mexico: Astronomy and Seasonal Cycles in the Codex Borgia, University of Texas Press, Austin, p. 118.
