= Rafael Gutiérrez Girardot =

Colombian philosopher (1928–2005)

Rafael Gutiérrez Girardot (5 May 1928 in Sogamoso, Colombia – 26 May 2005 in Bonn, Germany) was an expatriate Colombian philosopher, professor, translator and publisher.

== Career ==
Rafael Gutiérrez Giardot's father, a Conservative politician, was assassinated when Rafael was still a boy, prompting him to find solace and meaning through his studies. In 1947, Rafael attended classes at the recently created Institute of Philosophy at the National University of Colombia. Many of his early essays from this time appeared in the literary section of the conservative daily El Siglo, and he participated in the formation of a short-lived rightist political movement called "Revolución Nacional".

In 1950, disturbed by La Violencia and frustrated by what he felt was the poor quality of education in Colombia, Rafael left to study philosophy in Europe. His student work attracted the attention of Martin Heidegger, who personally invited him to come to Germany in 1953. He enrolled at the University of Freiburg, where he took his doctorate and met his wife, Marliese.

In 1956, through his friend Eduardo Cote Lamus, who was the Consul in Frankfurt, Rafael obtained a position as translator for the Colombian embassy in Bonn. He was later promoted to Cultural Attaché. In 1959, Rafael and Francisco Pérez González founded the publishing house "Taurus", which presented many German authors in Spanish translation for the first time.

Rafael's literary work did not distract him from issues involving education. In 1965, in response to a UNESCO proposal for reforming Latin-American universities, he published an essay, "Ten Theses on a Theme: The Private University and Underdevelopment", where he accused the private universities of destroying "the people", fomenting classism, creating social violence, promoting studies to serve the interests of imperialism, lowering the quality of scientific research and corrupting academic ethics.

The following year, Rafael was dismissed from his position at the embassy and transferred to the Ministry of External Affairs in Bogotá. While there, he taught at several universities. His continuing disillusionment with the university system in Colombia led him to return to Germany in 1969, where he became involved in social research at the University of Münster. Finally, in 1970, he became a full professor at the University of Bonn, where he helped create their Hispanic Studies department. He held that position until his retirement in 1993. Shortly thereafter, he was named professor emeritus. Despite his self-imposed exile, throughout these years he continued to contribute articles to several Latin-American newspapers and magazines. In 2002, he received the Alfonso Reyes International Prize for his lifetime achievements.

== Selected works ==
- Modernismo: Supuestos Históricos y Culturales, Fondo de Cultura Económica (1988) ISBN 958-380-095-3
- Hispanoamérica: Imágenes y Perspectivas, Temis (1989) ISBN 84-8272-396-0
- Provocaciones: Ensayos, Fundacion Nuestra America Mestiza (1992) ISBN 958-330-022-5
- Cuestiones, Fondo de Cultura Económica (1995) ISBN 968-16-4285-6
- Insistencias, Ariel (1998) ISBN 958-614-633-2
- Heterodoxias, Taurus (2000) ISBN 958-7041-42-9
- Entre la Ilustración y el Expresionismo: Figuras de la Literatura Alemana, Fondo de Cultura Económica (2004) ISBN 958-380-096-1
