= Malva Flores =

Mexican poet

Malva Flores (born September 12, 1961, in Mexico City) is a contemporary Mexican poet. She has also published short stories and essays.

In 1991, she was awarded the Premio Nacional de Poesía Joven "Elías Nandino" for her book of poems Pasión de caza. In 1999, she was awarded the Premio Nacional de Poesía Aguascalientes, for her book of poems Casa nómada. She is also the recipient of the Premio Nacional de Ensayo "José Revueltas" (2006) for her work "El ocaso de los poetas intelectuales: poesía y política". She is a member of the editorial committee of Literal Magazine.

== Published works ==
=== Poetry ===
- Mudanza del árbol / Passage of the Tree. Translated to English by T. G. Huntington. Houston: Literal Publishing, 2006. ISBN 8977028728
- Malparaíso, México, Eldorado, 2003 (Col. Serpiente breve)
- Casa nómada, México, Joaquín Mortiz, 1999
- Ladera de las cosas vivas, México, CNCA, 1997 (Col. Práctica Mortal)
- Pasión de caza, México, Ediciones de Cultura del Gobierno de Jalisco, 1993. (Col. Orígenes)

=== Short stories ===
- Las otras comarcas, México, Universidad Autónoma Metropolitana, 1990 (Col. Correo Menor)
- Agonía de falenas, México, SEP/CREA, 1988 (Col. Letras nuevas. Narrativa).

=== Essay ===
- "Progenie de ceiba" Chiapas siglo XX/ Coord. Roberto Sepúlveda, CONACULTA /Coneculta, 2000, pp. 103–153.
- Chiapas: voces particulares (Antología de la literatura chiapaneca), México, CNCA, 1993
