= Das Kunstblatt =

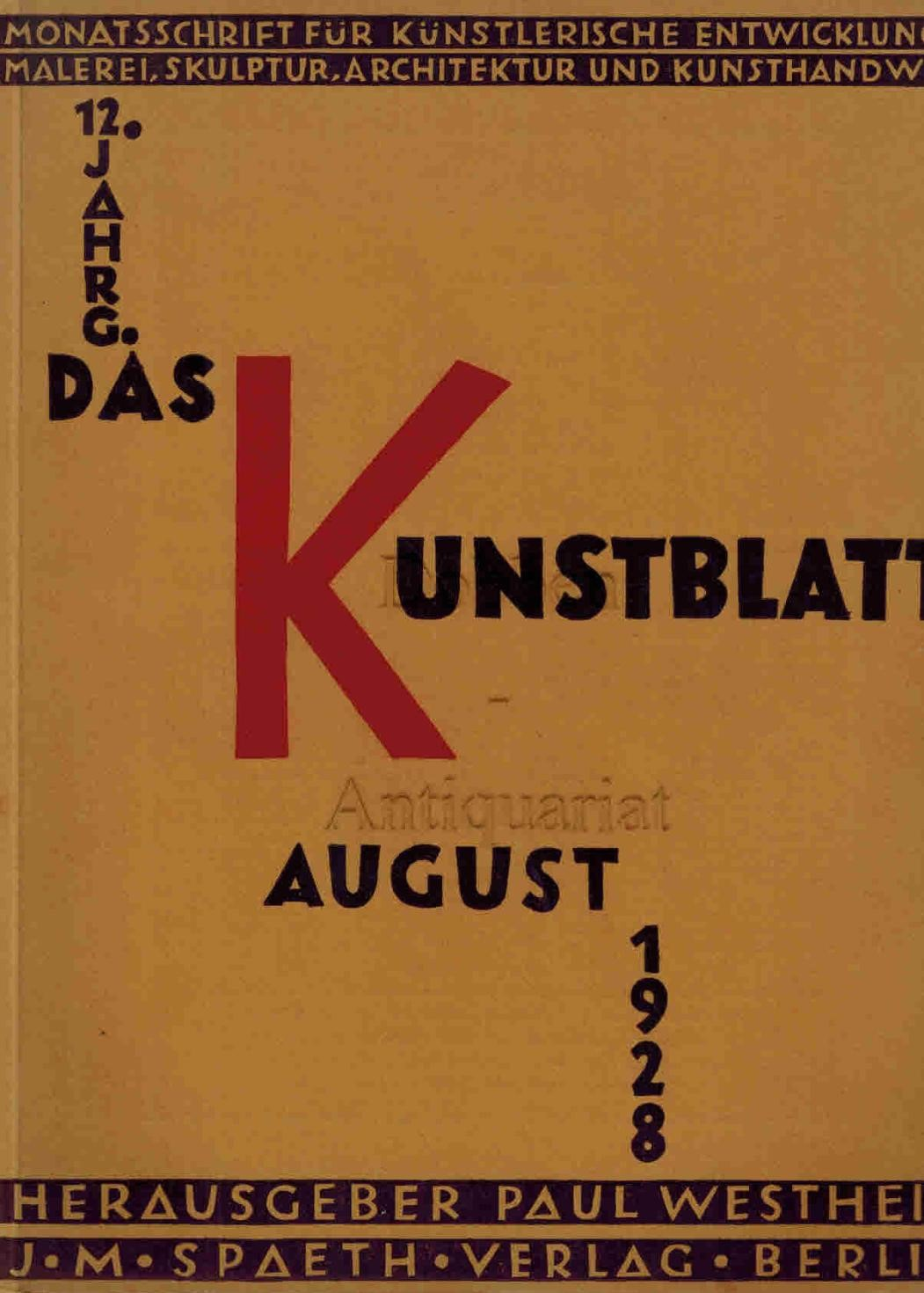
Das Kunstblatt

Das Kunstblatt was a German art magazine published between 1916 and 1933 by Paul Westheim and Israel Ber Neumann in Weimar Germany. From its earliest issues, Das Kunstblatt presented and explored modernist approaches, particularly Expressionism, and published essays by critics and artists engaged with new artistic movements.

The magazine also featured frequent inclusions of original graphic prints by living artists.

== Suppression under Nazi Germany ==
Following the Nazi seizure of power in 1933, Das Kunstblatt was forced to cease publication. Its modernist orientation, international scope, and association with artists later condemned as representatives of “degenerate art” placed it in conflict with National Socialist cultural policy, particularly given Westheim's jewish background.

The closure of Das Kunstblatt formed part of the broader suppression of modernist art and critical discourse in Nazi Germany, which targeted papers, institutions, and creatives associated with avant-garde culture.

== Bibliography ==
- Malcolm Gee, ″The 'cultured city': the art press in Berlin and Paris in the early twentieth century″, in Printed Matters: Printing, Publishing and Urban Culture in Europe in the modern period, eds. M. Gee and T. Kirk, Ashgate, 2002, 150–173.
- Malcolm Gee, ‘The Berlin Art World, 1918-1933’ in: Malcolm Gee, Tim Kirk and Jill Steward (eds), The City in central Europe : culture and society from 1800 to the present: Ashgate, 1999.
