= Emilia Ortiz =

Mexican artist (1917–2012)

Emilia Ortiz Pérez
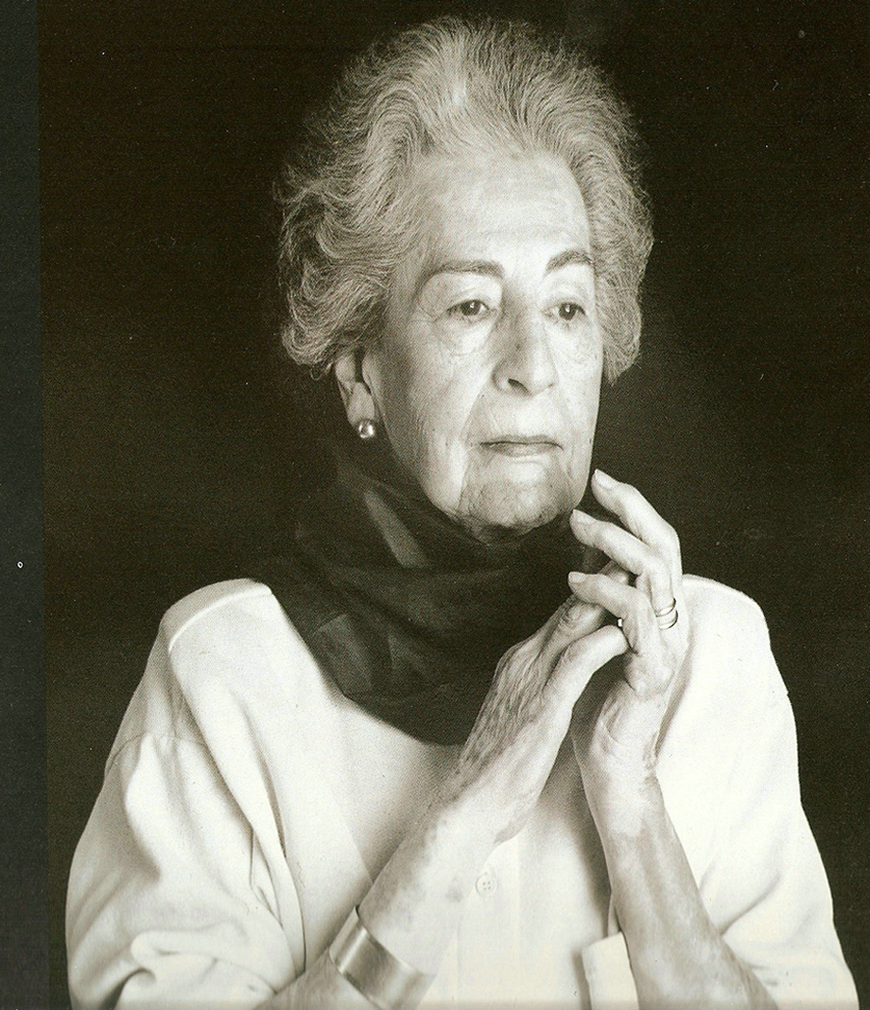
- Emilia Ortiz
- Born: Emilia Ortiz; 1917; Tepic, Mexico
- Died: 24 November 2012 (aged 94–95)
- Education: Academy of San Carlos
- Known for: painter, watercolorist, cartoonist, caricaturist, and poet

Emilia Ortiz Pérez (Tepic, 1917 – Tepic, November 24, 2012) was a Nayarit Mexican painter, cartoonist, caricaturist, and poet, best known for her watercolors she made of the indigenous groups in her area, and the caricatures she created from an early age of political figures and those she knew. Emilia would go on to create over 4,000 works that varied in subject matter. Her father, Abraham D. Ortiz, had arrived at Tepic originally from Oaxaca where he married Elvira Perez and engaged in haberdashery and the hardware trade. Emilia studied painting at the Academy of San Carlos in Mexico City. Her drawings and paintings were exhibited in 1940. An author as well, her prizewinning book, De mis soledades vengo, was published in 1986. The Museo Emilia Ortiz in Lerdo houses Ortiz's photography and art, as well as local art. She is survived by her daughter Gabriela, who is the current curator of the Contemporary Art Center Emilia Ortiz.

== Biography ==
Emilia Ortiz was born to Abraham D. Ortiz, a relative of Porfirio Diaz, and Elvira Perez, a painter and pianist, on February 10, 1917 in Tepic, Nayarit. They had five children; Emilia, Estela, Susana, Elvira, Abraham, and Yolanda. Emilia was interested in the art from an early age, starting a love for dancing that soon changed to acting while also creating caricatures. Emilia was a part of the "Cabaret Nights" she organized at the nearby Tepic Casino, eventually being crowned the Tepic Carnival Queen, that was passed to another local girl, Sarita Pantoja, since a relative had recently passed. To foster her love of acting, Emilia was part of Alfredo Castillo's theater group where they performed works by; Garcia Lorca, Basurto, Villaurrutia, and Pirandello. Due to her mother's refusal of Emilia's participation in a performance that was to be done in Guadalajara, Emilia shifted away from acting. From then on she would focus more on her art and documenting the indigenous groups of Nayarit along with the people she knew in life. Emilia later passed on November 24, 2012 in Nayarit.

=== Education ===
Until sixth grade, Emilia had been taught by the late miss Cuca Sanchez, but after miss Sanchez's passing she was sent to the College of the Incarnate World. Emilia's early interest in art led to her receiving private classes from Jose Vizcarra, who was known for training painters from Guadalajara. From him she was encouraged to draw portraits of "Indians and mestizos", this same theme would continue in her later work as well. Later she would attend San Carlos Academy with her sister, Elvira, and learn from Manuel Rodriquez Lozano where she learned to paint with oils. To understand the human figure, Emilia turned to books about Michelangelo's work to learn the nude anatomy. She would also go on to learn from the sculptor Luis Ortiz Monasterio at the Nacional School of the Fine Arts in Mexico City.

== Artistic career ==
Emilia received her first commission at a young age. At only 10 she was asked by a worker at Casa de Aguirre to help design a logo for worker pants. The image she was asked to create was of a boy whose pants were being bit by a dog as he climbed a latter to showcase the durability of the pants.

=== El Nacional Caricatures ===
Later when Emilia was 16, in 1933, she would be published in the El Nacional for her caricature work. Those caricatures touched on "letters, politics and business in Nayarit environments" and were featured on the front page titled "La nota alegre a traves de le sutil ironia de mujercita inteligente y bella". The people she chose to create the caricatures of were Everado Pena Navarro, Chema Suarez, Dr. Izaguirre y Rojo, Pepito Ruvalcaba, and Juan Maisterrena. She did not continue doing caricature work much longer for El Nacional since the artworks were not being seen on a grand scale, only by those who were locals.

Each caricature was an exaggerated depiction of the men but still maintained a likeness based on key features. They each vary in expression, from grinning to appearing distraught, as well as being a side-profile that highlights the exaggeration of their noses, mouths and eyes, except for one. The Dr. Izaguirre caricature is the only one facing forward where the exaggeration of the eyes and head shape appear to be the main focus.

=== Coras y Huichols ===
In 1940, with the help of her uncle, Juan de Dios Batiz, Emilia and her sister Elvira put together an exhibition of their watercolor works in the Palacio de Bellas artes in the Green Room in Mexico City. There was a total of 38 works on display themed around the Huichols and Coras the girls had painted. Emilia would continue her artworks on the Huichols and Coras but changing to pencils and gauche. Emilia's goal was to highlight the hostile environments the Sierra Madre Occidental and other indigenous inhabitants in the area faced. Emilia posed them as the main focal point, showing their autonomy since they are facing the viewer and not shying away.

Emilia used heavy shadows in their hair, but used more linework than shading to convey the clothing and expressions of the subjects. In Pareja Cora, 1938, Emilia showed the type of clothing worn by the Coras and the way couples would interact with each other. Another pencil and paper artwork, Huichol Con Panuelo, 1936, shows more of the contrast Emilia used. Her figure has their face, arms, and hair heavily shaded, providing great detail of the physical appearance of the Huichol. Yet, used linework to show the clothing and common surrounding of the person.

=== Contemporary Art Center Emilia Ortiz ===
Due to the impact Emilia Ortiz Perez had on the contemporary art scene in Nayarit, a museum was created to house her work and other contemporary artworks. The Contemporary art Center Emilia Ortiz was in a smaller location in Lerdo before it was moved to a larger venue in Centro Tepic. The Museum's address is Miguel Hidalgo No. 17, Centro, Tepic, Nayarit. It has free admission and is open Tuesdays through Sundays. The museum contains workshops and conferences in conjunction with the displayed artworks. There are six exhibition rooms that contain various modern sculptures, paintings, and photographs. The State Art Gallery along with the Nayarit Plastic Workshop in the museum is where courses on photography, painting and drawing are taught.

==== Sayings and Proverbs (Dichos y refranes) ====
The artworks featured in the Contemporary Art Center Emilia Ortiz are many of Emilia's caricatures and the works she did in her Saying and Porverbs series. This series was created between 1969 and 2000. With these paintings, Emilia continued her exploration of Oils, using vibrant colors and an overexaggerating of proportions to express the various common sayings in Nayarit. One such painting is No es que sea tan gorda Chepa, lo que tiene es mal fajada, created in 1990 with oil paints and canvas. The saying translates to, It's not that Chepa is so fat, what it has is badly wrapped, which Emilia chose to interpret as a larger woman riding a cycling machine as she appears to struggle. This seems to show that the saying claimed the issue of a larger weight was conducive to the subjects genetics and not a lack of exercise.

== Exhibitions ==
=== Individual ===
- 1955 - Collegio Nacional de Arquitectos de Mexico y Sociedad de Arquitectos Mexicanos. Mexico, D.F.
- 1963 - Foyer del Teatro Juarez. Guanajuato, Gto.
- 1964 - Unidad Mazatlan del Plan Lopez Mateos Para la Vivienda Popular. Mazatlan, Sin.
- 1964 - Centro Cultural Ignacio Ramirez. San Migel de Allende, Gto.
- 1965 - Casa de la Cultural Jalisciense, "Sala Dr. Atl". Guadalajara, work Jal.
- 1971 - Terraza Water and Power Building. Los Angeles, California.
- 1973 - Museo de Antropologica e Historia del Estado de Nayarit. Tepic, Nay.
- 1973 - Mezzanine del Teatro Degollado. Guadalajara, Jal.
- 1976 - Cafe y Arte Xieca. Tepic, Nay.
- 1978 - Museo de Arte Contemporaneo de Moreila. Morelia, Mich.
- 1982 - Museo de Anthropologia e Histroia del Estado de Nayarit. Tepic, Nay.
- 1986 - Restropectiva Galeria OMR. Mexicao, D.F.
- 1986 - Instituto Cultural Cabanas (Muestra Itinerante). Guadalajara, Jal.
- 1986 - Museo de Arte Moderno del Centro Cultural Difocur (Muestra Itinerante). Culiacan, Sin.
- 1988 - Galeria Teatro del Pueblo. Tepic, Nay.
- 1991 - Fundacion Alica de Nayarit, A.C., Sala de Exposiciones Emilia Ortiz, "Muestra de caricatures". Tepic, Nay.
- 1993 - Galeria de Arte Moderno. Guadalajara, Jal.
- 1993 - Museo Emilia ortiz (Apertura del Museo EMilia Ortiz), "Obra costumbrista". Tepic, Nay.
- 1994 - Museo Emilia Ortiz, "Problematica Social". Tepic, Nay.

=== Collectives ===
- 1940 - Palacio de Bellas Artes, Sala Verde. Mexico, D.F.
- 1976 - Museo Regional de Antropologia e Historia. Tepic, Nay.
- 1976 - Instituto Mexicano del Cafe, Galeria Xieca. Tepic, Nay.
- 1977 - Palacio de Gobierno del Estado, "1er Salon Anual del la Plastica Nayarita". Tepic, Nay.
- 1977 - Galeria UNO, "Pintores del la Plastica Nayarita". Puerto Vallarta, Jal.
- 1978 - Cafe Arte del Morelia. Morelia, Mich.
- 1978 - Palacio Municipal del Estado, "Taller de la Plastica Nayarita, A.C.", Homenaje al 8vo Aniversario del Ateneo Nayarita Amado Nervo. Tepic, Nay.
- 1978 - Cafe y Arte Xieca, "La Mujer en la Plastica". Tepic, Nay.
- 1987 - Foro de Arte y Cultura del Departamento de Bellas Artes del Gobierno de Jalisco, "5 Artistas Contemporaneos". Guadalajara, Jal.
- 1988 - Universidad Autonoma de Nayarit. Tepic, Nay.
- 1988 - Casa de la Cultura Jaliscience, Salon de OCtubre. Guadalajara, Jal.
- 1989 - Palacio de Gobierno del Estado, "Homenaje al Talento Artistico de las Pintoras Nayaritas". Tepic, Nay.
- 1989 - Museo de Bellas Artes, "Coras y Huicholes en Exposicion Nayarit Presencia Plastica". Mexico, D.F.
- 1993 - Galeria de Artw Contemporaneo del ICANAY, "5ta Subasta Anual del Taller de la Plastica Nayarita". Tepic, Nay.
- 1994 - Feria Nacional de Tepic, "Musetra Panoramica de la Plastica Nayarita Contemporanea '94". Tepic, Nay.

== Honors and awards ==
- 1985 - Won the El Trapichillo Poetry Prize for her collection of poems, De mis soledades vengo
- 2009 - Universidad Autonoma de Nayarit awarded Emilia degree of Doctor honoris Causa.
- 2010 - Contemporary Art Center Emilia Ortiz named after Emilia.
- Named president of The Cultural Association of Nayarit when originally formed.
- Has a library named after them, the Emilia Ortiz.

== Publications ==
=== Author ===
- De mis soledades vengo (1985). A set of poems that were free-verses about the different things Emilia has experienced in life, from her childhood to being a grandmother, she tells of what she saw and key associations with them.
- "Piper and Wormwood" section of the Gap newspaper

== Gallery ==
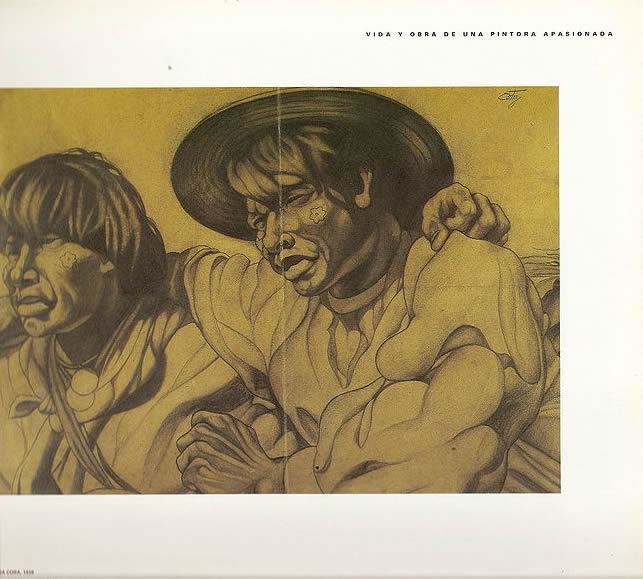

== Sources ==
- Elisa García Barragán (1995). EMILIA ORTIZ Vida y Obra de una pintora apasionada. FUNDACIÓN ALICA DE NAYARIT, A.C.. ISBN 968-29-6564-0.
