= Fondo de Cultura Económica =

Mexican publishing house

- Type: Publisher
- Founded: September 14, 1934; 92 years ago
- Founder: Daniel Cosío Villegas
- Headquarters: Mexico
- Website: fondodeculturaeconomica.com

Fondo de Cultura Económica (FCE or simply "Fondo") is a Spanish language, non-profit publishing group, partly funded by the Mexican government. It is based in Mexico but it has subsidiaries throughout the Spanish-speaking world.

It was founded in 1934 by Daniel Cosío Villegas with the original purpose of providing students of economics from the Escuela Nacional de Economía with specialized books in Spanish. Soon, it expanded its interests to other subjects: humanities, literature (mostly works written in Spanish), popular science, children's books and literature for young adults.

FCE's backlist encompasses more than ten thousand volumes, approximately 5,000 of which are still in print, and it has an electronic catalog of more than 1,300 titles. FCE has published the books of 65 authors who were awarded with the Nobel Prize; 33 authors awarded with the Miguel de Cervantes Prize, 29 authors honored by the Princess of Asturias Awards, and over 140 authors who were awarded the Mexican National Prize for Arts and Sciences.

The word Económica [“economic”] in its name does not allude to the low sales price of its books, a permanent goal of this publishing house, but to the aforementioned initial objective of publishing works on economics. Furthermore, the Mexican government provides resources to partially cover the costs of production, allowing books to be comparatively more affordable.

In Mexico, FCE has a chain of 27 bookstores in cities like Aguascalientes, Apatzingán, Mexico City, Nezahualcóyotl, Colima, Durango, Guadalajara, León, Monterrey, Morelia, Saltillo and Tuxtla Gutiérrez. In 2016, FCE opened bookstores in Villahermosa and Toluca.

Fondo de Cultura Económica has 8 foreign branches in Argentina, Chile, Colombia, Ecuador, Guatemala, Peru, Spain and the United States, which cover the Spanish-speaking population from North, Central and South America and the Caribbean.

Moreover, FCE has representative offices in Bolivia, Canada, Dominican Republic, Ecuador, Honduras and Puerto Rico, besides having distribution partners in Costa Rica, Nicaragua, Panama and Uruguay.

It publishes three periodicals: El Trimestre Económico, founded a few months before FCE itself; La Gaceta, founded in 1954; and Diánoia (jointly published by FCE and the Instituto de Investigaciones Filosóficas, UNAM), in circulation since 1955.

Fondo annually or biennially organizes five prizes and competitions for authors, illustrators and readers: Concurso Leamos la Ciencia para Todos (the Let's Read Science for All competition), Concurso de Álbum Ilustrado A la Orilla del Viento (the Picture Book at the Edge of the Wind competition), the Premio Hispanoamericano de Poesía para Niños (the Hispano-American Prize for Poetry for Children, together with the Fundación para las Letras Mexicanas), the Premio Internacional de Divulgación de la Ciencia Ruy Pérez Tamayo (the Ruy Pérez Tamayo International Prize for Science Exposition), and the Concurso Iberoamericano de Ensayo para Jóvenes (the Iberoamerican Essay Competition for Youth).

In 1989, FCE was awarded the Princess of Asturias Awards in the category of Communications and Humanities as recognition for its work in Spanish-speaking countries. In 1987, La Gaceta earned the Mexican Premio Nacional de Periodismo (National Journalism Prize).

== History ==
Thanks to its authors, editors, and translators, Fondo de Cultura Económica has an 80-year history of being a leading participant in the higher education system and cultural and literary movements of Mexico and Latin America. Among those who have shaped FCE's history are distinguished authors like Alfonso Reyes, Juan Rulfo, Juan José Arreola, Octavio Paz, Carlos Fuentes, Jorge Luis Borges, Carlos Pellicer, Raimundo Lida, José Gorostiza, Alí Chumacero, Salvador Elizondo, Ramón Xirau, Juan Goytisolo, Camilo José Cela, Luis Rosales, María Zambrano, Miguel Delibes, Ricardo Piglia, Gonzalo Rojas, Mario Vargas Llosa, Juan Gelman, Nicanor Parra, Álvaro Mutis, Alejo Carpentier, Sergio Pitol, Elena Garro, Rosario Castellanos, Elena Poniatowska, and Fernando del Paso.

- 1929 First publication of the journal Economía, sponsored by the Asociación de Banqueros and directed by Miguel Palacios Macedo during its first year, and by Daniel Cosío Villegas during its second year. The School of Economic Studies (forerunner of the Escuela Nacional de Economía) is established at the Department of Law of the Universidad Nacional de México.
- 1931 Cosío Villegas proposes the Aguilar and Espasa-Calpe publishing houses to issue works in economics. He presents them a list of 50 well-classified titles, which they both refuse, the latter largely due to the disapproval of José Ortega y Gasset.
- 1934 In April, publication of the first issue of El Trimestre Económico, an academic journal jointly directed by Cosío Villegas and Eduardo Villaseñor with the aim of providing translations and original articles on the subject. It is sponsored by Alberto Mizrachi. On September 3, a trust is registered in the name of Fondo de Cultura Económica at the Banco Nacional Hipotecario Urbano y de Obras Públicas with 22,000 pesos (5,000 from the Secretaría de Hacienda; 10,000 from the Banco de México; 4,000 from the Banco Nacional Hipotecario Urbano y de Obras Públicas; 2,000 from the Banco Nacional de Crédito Agrícola y Ganadero; and 1,000 from the Banco Nacional de México), with the sole purpose of publishing “the works of Mexican and foreign economists and to enter into agreements with publishers and booksellers to purchase and sell works on relevant economic issues.” A governing board is established, and Manuel Gómez Morin, Gonzalo Robles, Adolfo Prieto, Daniel Cosío Villegas, Eduardo Villasenor, and Emigdio Martinez Adame are its first members. A small office in 32 Madero Street, downtown Mexico City, precisely at the Banco Nacional Hipotecario Urbano y de Obras Públicas, serves as its headquarters. José C. Vazquez, editor and typographer, starts working at the publishing house.
- 1935 First volumes published: Silver Dollars, by William P. Shea and Harold J. Laski’s Karl Marx, two translations made by the renowned writers Salvador Novo and Antonio Castro Leal, respectively. FCE's logo, designed by Francisco Díaz de León (usually attributed to José Moreno Villa), is printed on the covers of both volumes. Gómez Morin and Prieto are replaced on the governing board by Jesus Silva Herzog and Enrique Sarro.
- 1937 Daniel Cosío Villegas is officially appointed first CEO.
- 1938 Foundation of the Casa de España en México, latter known as Colegio de México. Both FCE and Casa de España start a productive partnership of joint publications (now their offices are neighboring buildings in Mexico City).
- 1939 First history books published by FCE. Several refugees from the Spanish Republican exile join FCE's Technical Department as consultants, editors, translators, and trainers, a cooperation which lasted for generations and included José Gaos, Ramón Iglesia, José Medina Echavarría, Eugenio Ímaz, Manuel Pedroso, Javier Márquez, Sindulfo de la Fuente, Luis Alaminos, Vicente Herrero, Joaquín Díez-Canedo, and Francisco Giner. In August Begins the publication of Noticiero Bibliográfico.
- 1940 FCE moves to 63 Pánuco Street, an office shared with Casa de España. The Tezontle collection is launched.
- 1941 The first Catálogo General is published.
- 1942 The Philosophy collection is launched, at first advised by José Gaos, Eugenio Ímaz, and Eduardo García Maynes. Its first volume is Werner Wilhelm Jaeger’s Paideia: los ideales de la cultura griega. Joaquín Díez-Canedo joins FCE's Technical Department. The Anthropology collection is launched under the direction of Alfonso Caso and Daniel Rubin de la Borbolla. The first Catálogo General is published.
- 1944 In February, the Banco de México is appointed FCE's trustee.
- 1944 The first volumes of the Tierra Firme collection are published.
- 1945 Foundation of the Buenos Aires branch, directed by Arnaldo Orfila Reynal. The second Catálogo general is published.
- 1946 At the request of Cosío Villegas, Pedro Henríquez Ureña proposes a plan to create the Biblioteca Americana collection. Antonio Alatorre and Juan José Arreola, two important authors, join the Technical Department.
- 1947 Translated by Adrian Recinos, the Popol Vuh is the first volume of Biblioteca Americana, a collection created by Pedro Henriquez Ureña. The volume is published in his memory.
- 1948 Cosío Villegas leaves the direction of FCE and Orfila Reynal takes office, at first on an interim basis. The Breviarios collection is launched and Noticiero Bibliográfico begins its second series.
- 1950 Directed by Raimundo Lida, the Lengua y Estudios Literarios collection is launched.
- 1951 - 1957 The complete works of Sor Juana Inés de la Cruz published for the first time, edited by Alfonso Méndez Plancarte.
- 1952 With Alfonso Reyes’s Obra poética FCE launches the Letras Mexicanas collection, focused on the dissemination of Mexican literatura.
- 1954 FCE's second branch in Santiago de Chile inaugurated. Upon reaching its 20th anniversary, FCE moves to its own building, at 975 Av. Universidad, at the corner of Parroquia, in Mexico City. On September 10, President Adolfo Ruiz Cortines inaugurates the new headquarters. First issue of La Gaceta del Fondo de Cultura Económica.
- 1955 Publication of Alfonso Reyes's Obras completas begins. First issue of the journal Diánoia, directed by Eduardo Nicol. First edition of Juan Rulfo’s Pedro Páramo.
- 1956 Vida y Pensamiento de México collection launched with Fernando Benítez’s Ki: El drama de un pueblo y una planta, and Mauricio Magdaleno’s Las palabras perdidas.
- 1958 First volume of Mariano Azuela’s Obras Completas. First edition of Carlos Fuentes’s novel La región más transparente.
- 1959 FCE publishes the first edition of Octavio Paz’s classic El laberinto de la soledad. The Colección Popular is born with the reissue of Juan Rulfo’s El llano en llamas, first published in Letras Mexicanas collection in 1953.
- 1961 Third international branch opening in Lima, Peru.
- 1962 With the experience obtained after years in the Technical Department, Joaquín Díez-Canedo leaves the FCE and founds the Joaquín Mortiz publishing house.
- 1963 Fourth branch opens in Madrid, Spain, directed by Javier Pradera. Rodolfo Usigli’s Teatro completo starts publication.
- 1965 In November, Arnaldo Orfila Reynal leaves the direction of the FCE following a controversy promoted by the government of President Díaz Ordaz for the publication of works such as Oscar Lewis’s Los hijos de Sánchez, and Charles Wright Mills’s Escucha Yanqui. Salvador Azuela is appointed CEO. Orfila founds Siglo XXI Editores.
- 1970 Salvador Azuela leaves the direction in December and Antonio Carrillo Flores is appointed.
- 1971 During the first two months, the first issue of La Gaceta del Fondo de Cultura Economica’s “new series” appears, directed by Jaime García Terrés.
- 1972 Edited by Alí Chumacero, a new Catálogo general is published. A new bookstore opens in Mexico City. Opening of the new representative office in Puerto Rico. Carrillo Flores leaves the management and Francisco Javier Alejo is appointed in October.
- 1974 A new branch opens in Caracas, Venezuela. Another bookstore opens in Greater Mexico City and four more within the country. Guillermo Ramirez Hernandez is appointed deputy director in December.
- 1975 A new branch opens in Bogota, Colombia, with the goal of importing works published by FCE and act as a marketer. The journal El Trimestre Político is launched but releases only five issues.
- 1976 Alejo and Ramirez leave direction; José Luis Martinez is appointed CEO in December.
- 1982 Jaime García Terrés replaces José Luis Martinez in the management. Octavio Paz's important essay Sor Juana Inés de la Cruz o las trampas de la fe is published.
- 1983 The Lecturas Mexicanas collection is launched in a combined effort between FCE and the Secretaría de Educación Pública.
- 1984 Celebrating its 50th anniversary, FCE publishes Libro conmemorativo del primer medio siglo.
- 1986 The La Ciencia desde México collection is launched (in 1997 it would change its name to La Ciencia para Todos).
- 1988 Enrique González Pedrero is appointed CEO.
- 1990 The former Mexican president Miguel de la Madrid replaces González Pedrero as CEO. FCE's US branch in San Diego, California, begins operations.
- 1991 New branch in São Paulo, Brazil. A la Orilla del Viento, a new collection focused on children's literature, publishes its first volume: Pascuala Corona’s El pozo de los ratones y otros cuentos al calor del fogón.
- 1992 Located in the Carretera Picacho-Ajusco and designed by architect Teodoro González de León, FCE's new headquarters are inaugurated.
- 1993 Launch of Octavio Paz's Obras completas (Nobel Prize for Literature in 1990), in 15 volumes.
- 1994 Commemorating its 60th anniversary, FCE publishes its third Catálogo histórico and Víctor Díaz Arciniegas's Historia de la casa. Fondo de Cultura Económica (1934-1994).
- 1995 To meet the needs of Central America and the Caribbean markets, FCE opens its ninth branch in Guatemala.
- 2000 Gonzalo Celorio replaces Miguel de la Madrid as CEO in December. A new bookstore opens inside the premises of the Instituto Politécnico Nacional. In July, the Daniel Cosío Villegas bookstore reopens after renovation.
- 2002 Consuelo Sáizar Guerrero is appointed new CEO. La Gaceta is now available online.
- 2003 Two new collections created: Obras Reunidas, which releases Sergio Pitol’s volume I, and Libros sobre Libros, with books for publishing professionals. The Ricardo Pozas bookstore opens in Querétaro, the Efraín Huerta bookstore opens in León and the Luis González y González bookstore opens in Morelia; in Greater Mexico City, FCE opens the Trinidad Martínez Tarragó bookstore at the Centro de Investigación y Docencia Económicas (CIDE).
- 2004 FCE commemorates its 70th anniversary by creating the Colección Conmemorativa, a selection of some of its classic titles. FCE's most emblematic collections are redesigned and Juan Pablo Rulfo redraws the publishing house's logo.
- 2005 In October, with the fourth reprint of its third edition inside the Colección Popular collection of Octavio Paz's El laberinto de la soledad, Posdata y Vuelta a El laberinto de la soledad, FCE prints the one hundred millionth copy since its founding.
- 2006 The Centro Cultural Bella Época in Mexico City is opened, which houses the Rosario Castellanos bookstore, the Luis Cardoza y Aragón gallery and the Lido cinema.
- 2007 First title of the Poesía collection is Alí Chumacero's, Palabras en reposo. The collection is created to draw attention to the genre.
- 2008 A new building to house FCE's branch in Colombia is inaugurated: the Centro Cultural Gabriel García Márquez on the historic downtown of Bogotá. The building is the last work of Colombian architect Rogelio Salmona. FCE's back catalog begins its digitalization process.
- 2009 Joaquín Díez-Canedo Flores is appointed new CEO in March. On the occasion of FCE's 75th anniversary the Congreso Internacional del Mundo del Libro is held. The fourth edition of José Emilio Pacheco’s Tarde o temprano (Poemas 1958-2009) inside the Poesía collection is published.
- 2010 During the bicentennial of independence and the centennial of the Mexican Revolution, FCE publishes Martín Luis Guzmán’s Obras completas, and all seven volumes of Historia crítica de las modernizaciones de México, a joint publication with CIDE, as well as Alan Knight’s La Revolución Mexicana. First Feria del Libro Independiente held at the Rosario Castellanos bookstore. In December, FCE begins selling e-books in ePub format. The Edmundo O’Gorman bookstore opens in the premises of the Archivo General de la Nación.
- 2011 Publication of Juan Gelman’s Poesía reunida, and of a facsimile edition of the 17 classics published by José Vasconcelos in the 1920s. Directed by Claudio Lomnitiz and Fernando Escalante Gonzalbo, the new Umbrales collection issues its first title. The e-book catalog breaks the 100 titles mark. An app based on the Animalario universal del professor Revillod is released. In February, the José María Luis Mora bookstore opens in Mixcoac, and in November, the Miguel de la Madrid bookstore opens at Colima’s Casa de Cultura.
- 2012 FCE develops an app for Paloma Valdivia’s children’s book Es así.
- 2013 In January José Carreño Carlón is appointed CEO. The José Revueltas bookstore opens in Durango. La Gaceta is now available for iPad.
- 2014 FCE celebrates its 80th anniversary with the Festival el Libro y sus Lectores, which held the Feria del Libro Latinoamericano; a symposium entitled “Los libros que hacen crecer a los lectores”; the International Seminar “El libro electrónico y sus lectores”; the A la Orilla del Viento Carnival and the Encuentro de BookTubers. The Breviarios collection is relaunched and the newly created Comunicación collection releases its first titles. New editions of Octavio Paz's Obras completas, Efraín Huerta’s Poesía completa, and José Revueltas’s Errores published within the celebrations for the centenary of the three Mexican writers. Publication of Thomas Piketty’s El capital en el siglo XXI. FCE has now available for sale a thousand different e-books and the iOS and Android app Archivo abierto: ochenta años del FCE is released. The Guillermo Tovar de Teresa bookstore opens in Mexico City and the José Emilio Pacheco bookstore is inaugurated in Tuxtla Gutiérrez, inside the Centro Cultural Universitario Balún Canán. The Ricardo Pozas bookstore in Querétaro closes its doors to be replaced in 2016 by a new store named after Hugo Gutiérrez Vega, result of a partnership between FCE and the State’s Universidad Autónoma.
- 2015 The tenth branch, the Centro Cultural Carlos Fuentes in Quito, Ecuador, is inaugurated, after twenty years without any new foreign subsidiaries. In February, in collaboration with the Government of the State of Michoacán and the Municipal Government of Apatzingán, a new bookstore opens within the Centro Cultural of Apatzingán.
- 2018 Paco Ignacio Taibo II is appointed CEO.

== CEOs ==
CEOs	Term
Daniel Cosío Villegas	1934–1948
Arnaldo Orfila Reynal	1948–1965
Salvador Azuela	1965–1970
Antonio Carrillo Flores	1970–1972
Francisco Javier Alejo	1972–1974
Guillermo Ramírez Hernández	1974–1976
José Luis Martínez	1977–1982
Jaime García Terrés	1982–1988
Enrique González Pedrero	1988–1990
Miguel de la Madrid Hurtado	1990–2000
Gonzalo Celorio	2000–2002
Consuelo Sáizar Guerrero	2002–2009
Joaquín Díez-Canedo Flores	2009–2013
José Carreño Carlón	2013–2018
Paco Ignacio Taibo II	2018–

== Releases ==
=== Collections ===
FCE's backlist encompasses more than ten thousand titles, among which five thousand remain available (i.e., reprinted or in stock). Its catalogue is organized in over 100 collections.

=== Periodicals ===
Fondo de Cultura Económica publishes three periodicals:

- El Trimestre Económico. Forerunner of FCE itself, this journal began by issuing translations of articles published in major journals in English and gradually began including original research by scholars and government officials from Mexico and Latin America.
- La Gaceta. Founded by Arnaldo Orfila Reynal on FCE's 20th anniversary, it is a monthly magazine with excerpts, reviews, articles, and poems. With Jaime García Terrés as its chief editor it took an outstanding literary direction and achieved international presence. In 1987, it received the Mexican Premio Nacional de Periodismo. Today it can be read online (as PDF) and through the iOS and Android apps.
- Diánoia. It is a peer-reviewed philosophy journal jointly published by FCE and the Instituto de Investigaciones Filosóficas, UNAM, since 1955. Its main goal is to promote, coordinate and disseminate original and high-level philosophical production in Spanish. Until 2001, it was a yearly periodical and has been biannual since.

=== Electronic publishing ===
FCE has four types of electronic publications:

- E-books in ePub and other formats, with up to 1,300 available titles in major e-stores such as Amazon, iBooks, GooglePlay, Barnes & Noble, Snowfall, Todoebook, and its own web site.
- Interactive Books, both apps and ePub files; for example, Paloma Valdivia's Es así.
- iOS and Android apps for tablets; some of them are: Animalario universal del professor Revillod, Archivo abierto: 80 años del FCE, La Gaceta, and a version of José Moreno de Alba’s Minucias del lenguaje.
- Web sites; this includes a version of Moreno de Alba's Minucias del lenguaje, La Gaceta, and El Trimestre Económico under the Open Journals Systems standard (forthcoming).

== FCE’s Headquarters ==
=== Head Office ===
On September 4, 1992, Miguel de la Madrid Hurtado, then CEO, inaugurated the new FCE's facilities, located in 227 Picacho-Ajusco Highway, in Mexico City. Surrounded by gardens, the facility also houses the Unidad Cultural Jesús Silva Herzog, the Gonzalo Robles Library, which preserves FCE's growing collection, and the Alfonso Reyes bookstore.

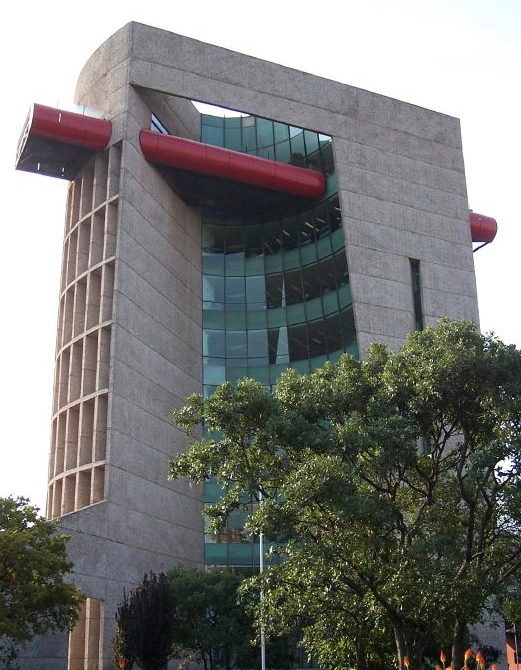
FCE's central office

=== Foreign branches ===
In addition to its central office in Mexico, FCE has subsidiaries in (year of foundation in brackets):

- Buenos Aires (Argentina, 1945)
- Santiago (Chile, 1954)
- Lima (Peru, 1961)
- Madrid (Spain, 1963)
- Bogotá (Colombia, 1975)
- San Diego (United States, 1990) FCE USA
- Guatemala City (Guatemala and Central America, 1995)
- Quito (Ecuador, 2015)

== Bookstores ==
FCE runs 37 bookstores, 27 in Mexico and 10 all over the Spanish-speaking world. It sells and distributes its own catalog and also books from other publishers.

== Bibliography ==
  - Aboites, Luis; Loyo, Engracia (2010). “La construcción del nuevo Estado, 1920-1945”. In Erik Velásquez García et al. Nueva historia general de México. Mexico: El Colegio de México. pp. 595–652. ISBN 9786074621792.
  - Ángel Mobarak, Gustavo de, and Graciela Márquez (eds.), Respuestas propias. 80 años de El Trimestre, Mexico: FCE, 2014, ISBN 9786071620378
  - Díaz Arciniega, Víctor, Historia de la casa. Fondo de Cultura Económica (1934-1994), Mexico: FCE, 1994.
  - Pacheco, Cristina, En el primer medio siglo del Fondo de Cultura Económica. Testimonios y conversaciones, Mexico: FCE, 1984.
  - Various authors, Fondo de Cultura Económica. Memoria editorial 1990-2000, Mexico: FCE, 2000.
  - Various authors, Catálogo histórico 1934-2009, Mexico: FCE, 2009.
  - Garone Gravier, Marina, Historia en cubierta. El Fondo de Cultura Económica a través de sus portadas (1934-2009), Mexico: FCE, 2011.

(in Spanish)

- This article draws heavily on the [[{{{1}}}|corresponding article]] in the Spanish-language Wikipedia, which was accessed in the version of {{{2}}}.
