= Marcel Bataillon =

French academic and historian (1895–1977)

Marcel Édouard Bataillon
- Born: May 20, 1895; Dijon, France
- Died: June 4, 1977 (aged 82); Paris, France
- Education: École Normale Supérieure
- Occupations: Hispanicist, academic
- Employer(s): University of Lisbon; University of Algiers; Sorbonne; Collège de France
- Known for: Chair of Iberian and Latin-American Languages, Collège de France

Marcel Édouard Bataillon (Dijon, 20 May 1895 – Paris, 4 June 1977) was a French hispanist who specialized in the philosophy and spirituality of sixteenth-century Spain.

== Career ==
He began his studies in 1913 at the École Normale Supérieure. This was followed by a term at l'École des Hautes Études Hispaniques in Madrid where he was a delegate to the "International Committee of Allied Propaganda". From 1916 to 1919, he was a lieutenant in the French artillery. He emerged from these experiences as a confirmed pacifist.

During his time in Spain he developed a passion for Spanish culture. After completing his national exams for the teaching of Spanish in 1920, he became a teacher at the University of Lisbon, then at the Lycée de Bordeaux, then the University of Algiers where, in 1936, he was a candidate of the Popular Front for legislative elections. He temporarily settled at the Sorbonne, where he was a professor of Spanish Language and Literature. From 1934 to 1939, he was a member of the "Comité de vigilance des intellectuels antifascistes", which resulted in a brief stay at the Royallieu-Compiègne internment camp in 1941.

He remained at the Sorbonne until 1945 when he transferred to the Collège de France, where he became the chair of the department for "Languages and Literatures of the Iberian Peninsula and Latin-America", a position he held for twenty years. He was the college's Administrator from 1955 to 1965. Bataillon became a foreign member of the Royal Netherlands Academy of Arts and Sciences in 1964.

The Iberoamerican studies library at the Sorbonne has been named after him. In 1972, the Marcel Bataillon Professorship in Comparative Literature was established at the University of North Carolina. He became the second recipient of the Alfonso Reyes International Prize in 1974.

== Selected works ==
- La Celestine Selon Fernando de Rojas, Marcel Didier (1961)
- Novedad y Fecundidad del Lazarillo de Tormes, Anaya (1973) ISBN 84-207-0933-6
- El Padre Las Casas y la Defensa de los Indios, Ariel (1976) ISBN 84-344-0755-8
- La Vie de Lazarillo de Tormès, Flammarion (1993) ISBN 2-08-070646-2
- Erasmo y España: Estudios Sobre la Historia Espiritual del Siglo XVI, Fondo de Cultura Económica (1997) ISBN 968-16-1069-5 (French: Erasme et l'Espagne, Librairie Droz (1998) ISBN 2-600-00510-2) Originally published in 1937, during the height of the Spanish Civil War, this is considered to be Bataillon's magnum opus. Close to one thousand pages long and seventeen years in the writing, it received little critical attention until it was translated into Spanish in 1950.
- Les Jésuites dans l’Espagne du XVIe Siècle, preface by Gilles Bataillon, Belles Lettres (2009) ISBN 2-251-38096-5
