= National Prize for Arts and Sciences (Mexico) =

National award in Mexico

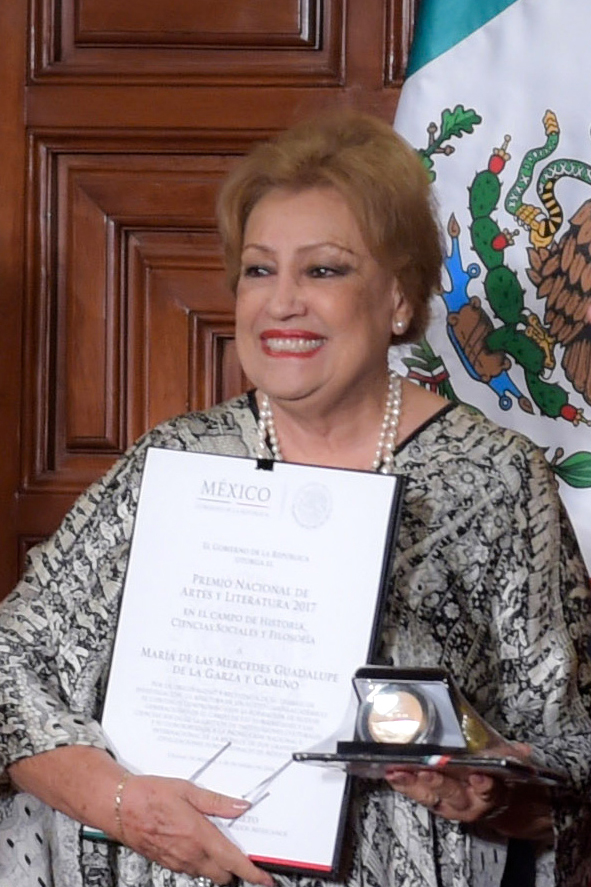
Mercedes de la Garza Camino receiving the award in 2017

The National Prize for Arts and Sciences (Spanish: Premio Nacional de Ciencias y Artes) is awarded annually by the Government of Mexico in six categories. It is part of the Mexican Honours System and was established in 1945 by President Manuel Ávila Camacho to promote the country's artistic, scientific, and technological advancement.

It is awarded yearly to one or more persons that meets the conditions of the prize, in one of the following categories:

- Linguistics and literature
- Fine Arts
- History, Social Sciences and Philosophy
- Popular arts and traditions
- Physics, Mathematics and Natural Sciences
- Technology and Design

In the case of the Popular arts and traditions category, the prize can also be awarded to groups, non-governmental organizations and institutions.

In 2015, the prize was divided between National Prize for Arts and Literature (Spanish: Premio Nacional de Artes y Literatura) and National Prize for Science – José Mario Molina Pasquel y Henríquez (Spanish: Premio Nacional de Ciencias). The former is awarded by the Secretariat of Culture and the latter by Secretariat of Public Education.

The prize is a gold medal, a rosette, a diploma signed by the President of Mexico and over $823,313.95 pesos (Approximately $40,000 US dollars).

Prior to 1945, a National Literature Prize (Spanish: Premio Nacional de Literatura) was established by the Secretariat of Public Education, which ceased to be awarded after the creation of the present prize.

In a controversial move, in 2020 Bertha Cecilia Navarro y Solares, movie producer, was awarded an "extraordinary distinction."

For a complete list of winners in tabular format, see the corresponding article in Spanish.

== Linguistics and literature ==
Lingüística y Literatura

- 1946: Alfonso Reyes
- 1949: Mariano Azuela
- 1958: Martín Luis Guzmán
- 1964: Carlos Pellicer
- 1965: Ángel María Garibay
- 1966: Jaime Torres Bodet
- 1967: Salvador Novo
- 1968: José Gorostiza
- 1969: Silvio Zavala
- 1970: Juan Rulfo
- 1971: Daniel Cosío Villegas
- 1972: Rodolfo Usigli
- 1973: Agustín Yáñez
- 1974:
  - Edmundo O'Gorman
  - Rubén Bonifaz Nuño
- 1975: Francisco Monterde
- 1976:
  - Antonio Gómez Robledo
  - Efraín Huerta
- 1977: Octavio Paz
- 1978: Fernando Benítez Gutiérrez
- 1979: Juan José Arreola
- 1980: José Luis Martínez Rodríguez
- 1981: Mauricio Magdaleno
- 1982: Elías Nandino
- 1983: Jaime Sabines
- 1984: Carlos Fuentes Macías
- 1985: Marco Antonio Montes de Oca
- 1986: Rafael Solana
- 1987: Alí Chumacero
- 1988: Eduardo Lizalde
- 1990: Salvador Elizondo
- 1991: Fernando del Paso
- 1992: José Emilio Pacheco
- 1993: Sergio Pitol
- 1994: Andrés Henestrosa Morales
- 1995: Juan Miguel Lope Blanch
- 1996: Emilio Carballido
- 1997: German List Arzubide
- 1998: Antonio Alatorre
- 1999: Alejandro Rossi
- 2000: Margit Frenk
- 2001: Vicente Leñero
- 2002:
  - Elena Poniatowska
  - Luisa Josefina Hernández
- 2003: Ernesto de la Peña
- 2004: Margo Glantz
- 2005: Carlos Monsiváis
- 2006: Emmanuel Carballo
- 2007: Sergio Fernández Cárdenas
- 2008:
  - Jorge López Páez
  - José G. Moreno de Alba
- 2009:
  - Carlos Montemayor
  - Hugo Hiriart
  - José Luis Rivas
- 2010:
  - Maruxa Vilalta
  - Gonzalo Celorio
  - Ignacio Solares
- 2011:
  - José Agustín
  - Daniel Sada
- 2012: Francisco Hernández Pérez
- 2013:
  - Hugo Gutiérrez Vega
  - Luis Fernando Lara
- 2014:
  - Dolores Castro
  - Eraclio Zepeda
- 2015:
  - David Huerta
  - Felipe Garrido
  - Yolanda Lastra
- 2016: Elsa Cross
- 2017: Alberto Ruy Sánchez
- 2018: Angelina Muñiz-Huberman
- 2019: Concepción Company Company
- 2020: Jesús Adolfo Castañón Morán
- 2021: Óscar Mario Oliva Ruiz
- 2022: Selma Ancira
- 2023: Beatriz Espejo
- 2024: Vicente Quirarte
- 2025: Agustín Monsreal

== Fine arts ==
Bellas Artes

- 1945: José Clemente Orozco
- 1947: Manuel M. Ponce
- 1950: Diego Rivera
- 1951: Candelario Huízar
- 1958:
  - Carlos Chávez
  - Gerardo Murillo ("Dr. Atl")
- 1964:
  - Blas Galindo
  - Rufino Tamayo
- 1966: David Alfaro Siqueiros
- 1967:
  - Luis Ortiz Monasterio
  - Roberto Montenegro
- 1968: José Villagrán García
- 1969: Francisco Díaz de León
- 1970: Jorge González Camarena
- 1971: Gabriel Figueroa Mateos
- 1972: Juan O'Gorman
- 1973: Pedro Ramírez Vázquez
- 1974: José Chávez Morado
- 1975: Manuel Álvarez Bravo
- 1976:
  - Luis Barragán
  - Julio Prieto
  - Rodolfo Halffter
- 1977: Luis Buñuel
- 1978: Gunther Gerszo Wendland
- 1979: Guillermina Bravo
- 1981: José Luis Cuevas
- 1982:
  - Abraham Zabludovsky
  - Teodoro González de León
- 1983: Manuel Enríquez
- 1984: Pedro Coronel
- 1985: Alberto Beltrán
- 1986: Mario Pani
- 1987: Juan Soriano
- 1988: Manuel Felguérez Aspe
- 1989: Ignacio Díaz Morales
- 1990: Olga Costa
- 1991:
  - Mario Lavista
  - Ricardo Legorreta Vilchis
  - Vicente Rojo Almazán
- 1992:
  - Amalia Hernández Navarro
  - José Jesús Francisco Zúñiga Chavarría
  - Manuel de Elías
- 1993: Carlos Jiménez Mabarak
- 1994: Héctor Mendoza Franco
- 1995: Federico Silva
- 1996: Luis Nishizawa
- 1997: Arturo Ripstein
- 1998: Francisco Toledo
- 1999: Guillermo Arriaga Fernández
- 2000: José Raúl Anguiano Valadez
- 2001:
  - Alejandro Luna
  - Alfredo Zalce Torres
  - Federico Ibarra Groth
- 2002: Héctor García Cobo
- 2003:
  - Gilberto Horacio Aceves Navarro
  - J. Francisco Serrano Cacho
  - Ludwik Margules Coben
- 2004:
  - Juan José Gurrola
  - Agustín Hernández Navarro
- 2005:
  - Leonora Carrington
  - Luis Herrera de la Fuente
  - Gloria Contreras
- 2006:
  - Joaquín Gutiérrez Heras
  - Luis Fernando de Tavira Noriega
- 2007:
  - Carlos Prieto Jacqué
  - Felipe Cazals
- 2008:
  - José Solé
  - Graciela Iturbide
  - María Teresa Rodriguez
- 2009:
  - Helen Escobedo
  - Arturo Márquez
- 2010:
  - Luis López Loza
  - Marta Palau Bosch
- 2011:
  - Pedro Cervantes
  - Jorge Fons
- 2012:
  - Arón Claudio Bitrán Goren
  - Fernando González Gortázar
  - Helene Joy Laville Perren
- 2013:
  - Javier Álvarez (composer)
  - Ángela Gurría
  - Paul Leduc (film director)
- 2014: Arnaldo Coen
- 2015:
  - Sebastián (sculptor)
  - Ignacio López Tarso
  - Fernando López Carmona
- 2016: Gabriela Ortiz
- 2017: Nicolás Echevarría
- 2018: Rosanna Filomarino
- 2019: Abraham Oceransky
- 2020: Manuel de Jesús Hernández (Hersúa)
- 2021: Sergio Ismael Cárdenas Tamez
- 2022: María Rojo
- 2023: Claudio Valdés Kuri
- 2024: Gerardo Tamez
- 2025: Irma Palacios

== History, Social Sciences, and Philosophy ==
Historia, Ciencias Sociales y Filosofía

- 1960: Alfonso Caso
- 1962: Jesús Silva Herzog
- 1969: Ignacio Bernal
- 1976: Eduardo García Máynez
- 1977: Víctor L. Urquidi Bingham
- 1978: Mario de la Cueva
- 1979: Gonzalo Aguirre Beltrán
- 1980: Leopoldo Zea Aguilar
- 1981: Miguel León-Portilla
- 1982: Héctor Fix Zamudio
- 1983: Luis González y González
- 1984: Pablo González Casanova
- 1985: Alfonso Noriega Cantú
- 1986: Luis Villoro Toranzo
- 1990: (Not awarded)
- 1991: Juan Antonio Ortega y Medina
- 1992:
  - Luis González Rodríguez
  - Juan Somolinos Palencia
- 1993:
  - Moisés González Navarro
  - Fernando Salmerón
- 1994: Román Piña Chan
- 1995:
  - Israel Cavazos Garza
  - Ramón Xirau
- 1996:
  - Enrique Florescano
  - Pablo Latapí Sarre
- 1997: Rodolfo Stavenhagen
- 1999: Josefina Zoraida Vázquez
- 2000: Fernando Flores García
- 2001: Ida Rodríguez Prampolini
- 2002: Adolfo Sánchez Vázquez
- 2003: Víctor Manuel Alcaraz
- 2004: Juliana González Valenzuela
- 2005:
  - Elisa Vargaslugo Rangel
  - Jorge Alberto Manrique y Castañeda
- 2006: Larissa Adler
- 2007:
  - Pilar Gonzalbo Aizpuru
  - Eduardo Matos Moctezuma
- 2008:
  - Jaime Labastida
  - Álvaro Matute Aguirre
  - Margarita Nolasco Armas
- 2009:
  - Enrique de la Garza Toledo
  - José Ramón Cossío
- 2010:
  - Enrique Krauze
  - Soledad Loaeza
- 2011:
  - Jean Meyer
  - Lorenzo Meyer
- 2012:
  - Carlos Marichal
  - Carlos Muñoz Izquierdo
- 2013:
  - Roger Bartra
  - Carlos Martínez Assad
- 2014:
  - Néstor García Canclini
  - Enrique Semo
- 2015: Antonio García de León
- 2016: Aurelio de los Reyes
- 2017: Mercedes de la Garza Camino
- 2018: Salomón Nahmad y Sittón
- 2019: Diego Valadés Ríos
- 2020: Alfredo Federico López Austin
- 2021: Fernando Serrano Migallón
- 2022: Antonio Rubial
- 2023: José Manuel Valenzuela Arce
- 2024:
  - Teresa Rojas Rabiela
  - Leonardo López Luján
- 2025: Mario Humberto Ruz

== Popular Arts and Traditions ==
Artes y Tradiciones Populares

Awards in this field were first presented in 1984 and are the only ones that can be given to institutions and individuals.

- 1984: Artesanos de Santa Clara del Cobre
- 1985:
  - Banda Infantil del centro de Capacitación Musical de la región Mixe
  - Mixtec tyrian purple dyers using plicopurpura pansa sea snails, Pinotepa Nacional
- 1986:
  - Chichimeca folk dance group, in Querétaro (Concheros)
  - Sna Jolobil indigenous weavers community
- 1987: Seri people handicraftsmen
- 1988: Roberto Ruiz (artisan)
- 1989: Manuel Esperón, Gabriel Ruiz Galindo, Consuelo Velázquez
- 1990: Pedro Linares López
- 1991: Pyrotechnics from Tultepec, State of Mexico
- 1992: Gorky González Quiñones
- 1993: Lacquering handicraftsmen from Olinalá, Guerrero
- 1994: Mario Kuri Aldana
- 1995: Jorge Wilmot
- 1996:
  - Alfonso Castillo Orta
  - Zeferino Nandayapa
- 1997: Juan Reynoso Portillo
- 1998:
  - "Brígido Santa María" music band from Tlayacapan, Morelos
  - Antonio López Hernández
- 1999:
  - Yucalpetén Orchestra
  - Juan Quezada Celado
- 2000:
  - Joel Wilfrido Flores Villegas
  - Assembly of Danza de los Voladores performers from Papantla, Veracruz
- 2001:
  - Rebozo weavers and handicraftsman from Santa María del Río, San Luis Potosí
  - Silvestre Tiburcio Noyola Rodríguez
- 2002:
  - Erasmo Palma Fernández
  - Juan Rivera García
  - Ramón Mata Torres
- 2003:
  - Gabriel Vargas
  - José Benítez Sánchez
- 2004:
  - Sna jtz'ibajom House of the Maya People actors and writers organization.
  - La Flor de Xochistlahuaca cooperative group.
  - La Judea, Cora Holy Week
- 2005:
  - Popoloca handicraftsman potters from Reyes Metzontla, Puebla
  - Evaristo Borboa Casas
  - Fortunato Ramírez Camacho
- 2006:
  - Tonalteca potters from Tonalá, Jalisco
  - Guadalupe Reyes Reyes
  - Leocadia Cruz Gómez
- 2007:
  - Francisco Coronel Navarro
  - Nahua painters from the Balsas River
  - Teodoro Torres Orea and Susana Navarro Alamilla
- 2008:
  - Angélica Delfina Vásquez Cruz
  - Los Cardencheros de Sapioriz
- 2009:
  - Celsa Iuit Moo
  - Cirilo Promotor Decena
  - Group of Purépecha handicraftsman potters from Ocumicho, Michoacán
- 2010:
  - Group of weaving women from San Andrés Larráinzar, Chiapas.
  - Group of indigenous handicraftsman from Baja California
- 2011:
  - Óscar Chávez
  - Barro negro potters from San Bartolo Coyotepec, Oaxaca
  - Wilberth Herrera
- 2012:
  - Antonio Camilo Bautista Jariz
  - Cofradía de San Juan Bautista group
  - Traditional music community formed by the Vega-Utrera family
- 2013: Narciso Lico Carrillo
- 2014:
  - Carlomagno Pedro Martínez
  - Alberto Vargas Castellano
- 2015:
  - Los Folkloristas
  - Victorina López Hilario
- 2016: Manuela Cecilia Lino Bello
- 2017: Francisco Barnett Astorga
- 2018: Leonor Farlow Espinoza
- 2019: Carmen Vázquez Hernández
- 2020: Mario Agustín Gaspar
- 2021: Taller Leñateros
- 2022: Abigail Mendoza Ruiz
- 2023: Guillermo Velázquez Benavides
- 2024:
  - Juana Bravo Lázaro
  - Antolín Vázquez Valenzuela
- 2025: Catalina Yolanda López Márquez

== Physics, Mathematics, and Natural Sciences ==
Ciencias Físico-Matemáticas y Naturales

- 1948: Maximiliano Ruiz Castañeda
- 1957: Nabor Carrillo Flores
- 1959: Manuel Sandoval Vallarta
- 1961: Ignacio Chávez Sánchez
- 1963: Guillermo Haro Barraza
- 1964: Ignacio González Guzmán
- 1966: Arturo Rosenblueth Stearns
- 1967: José Adem Chaín
- 1968: Salvador Zubirán Anchondo
- 1969: Fernando Alba Andrade
- 1970: Carlos Graef Fernández
- 1971: Jesús Romo Armería
- 1972:
  - Antonio González Ochoa
  - Isaac Costero
  - Luis Sánchez Medal
- 1973: Carlos Casas Campillo
- 1974:
  - Emilio Rosenblueth Deutsch
  - Ruy Pérez Tamayo
- 1975:
  - Arcadio Poveda Ricalde
  - Guillermo Massieu Helguera
  - Joaquín Cravioto
- 1976:
  - Ismael Herrera Revilla
  - Julían Adem Chahín
  - Samuel Gitler Hammer
- 1977: Jorge Cerbón Solórzano
- 1978: Rafael Méndez Martínez
- 1979: Pablo Rudomín Zevnovaty
- 1980: Guillermo Soberón Acevedo
- 1981: Manuel Peimbert Sierra
- 1982: Bernardo Sepúlveda Gutiérrez
- 1983: Octavio Augusto Novaro
- 1984: José Ruiz Herrera
- 1985: Marcos Rojkind Matlyuk
- 1986: Adolfo Martínez Palomo
- 1990: José Sarukhán Kermez
- 1991:
  - Pedro Joseph-Nathan
  - Miguel José Yacamán
- 1992:
  - Hugo Aréchiga Urtuzuástegui
  - Francisco Bolívar Zapata
- 1993: Luis Felipe Rodriguez
- 1994:
  - Jorge Flores Valdés
  - Rafael Palacios de la Lama
- 1995:
  - Marcelino Cereijido
  - Cinna Lomnitz
  - Lourival Domingos Possani Postay
- 1996:
  - Flavio Manuel Mena Jara
  - José Luis Morán López
- 1997: Jesús Adolfo García Sainz
- 1998: Eusebio Juaristi
- 1999:
  - Augusto Fernández Guardiola
  - Octavio José Obregón Díaz
- 2000:
  - Jorge Aceves Ruiz
  - Ranulfo Romo
- 2001:
  - Herminia Pasantes Morales Ordóñez
  - Julio Everardo Sotelo Dávila
  - Onésimo Hernández Lerma
- 2002:
  - Luis de la Peña
  - Luis Rafael Herrera Estrella
  - Ricardo Tapia Ibargüengoytia
- 2003:
  - Jorge Daniel Carlos Cantó Illa
  - Rubén Lisker Yourkowitsky
  - Thomas Henry Seligman Schurch
- 2004:
  - Alejandro Frank Hoeflich
  - Armando Gómez Puyou
- 2005:
  - José Antonio de la Peña
  - Shri Krishna Singh Singh
- 2006: Juan Ramón de la Fuente
- 2007:
  - Silvia Torres Castilleja
  - Carlos José Beyer y Torres
  - Guillermo Miguel Ruiz-Palacios y Santos
- 2008:
  - Edmundo García Moya
  - Alberto Robledo Nieto
  - Moisés Selman
- 2009:
  - Alberto Darszon Israel
  - Jaime Urrutia Fucugauchi
- 2010:
  - Marcelo Lozada y Cassou
  - Gerardo Gamba Ayala
- 2011: Julio Collado-Vides
- 2012:
  - Ruben Gerardo Barrera
  - Carlos Artemio Coello Coello
  - Susana Lizano
- 2013:
  - Federico Bermúdez Rattoni
  - Magdaleno Medina Noyola
- 2014:
  - Carlos Arias Ortiz
  - Mauricio Hernández Ávila
- 2015:
  - Jorge Alcocer Varela
  - Fernando del Río Haza
- 2016:
  - Cecilia Noguez
  - David Kershenobich Stalnikowitz
- 2017:María Elena Álvarez-Buylla Roces
- 2018:
  - Carlos Alberto Aguilar Salinas
  - Mónica Clapp
- 2019: Esperanza Martínez-Romero
- 2020: Juan Ángel Rivera Dommarco
- 2021:
  - Lena Ruiz Azuara
  - Santiago Alberto Verjovsky Solá
- 2022:
  - Roberto Escudero Derat
  - Annie Pardo Cemo
- 2023: Alfredo Heriberto Herrera Estrella

== Technology and Design ==
Tecnología y Diseño

- 1976:
  - Reinaldo Pérez Rayón
  - Wenceslao X. López Martín del Campo
- 1977: Francisco Rafael del Valle Canseco
- 1978: Enrique del Moral
- 1979: Juan Celada Salmón
- 1980: Marcos Mazari Menzer
- 1981: Luis Esteva Maraboto
- 1982: Raúl J. Marsal Córdoba
- 1983: José Antonio Ruiz de la Herrán Villagómez
- 1984: Jorge Suárez Díaz
- 1985: José Luis Sánchez Bribiesca
- 1986: Daniel Malacara Hernández
- 1987: Enrique Hong Chong
- 1988: Mayra de la Torre
- 1990:
  - Daniel Reséndiz Núñez
  - Juan Milton Garduño
- 1991:
  - Octavio Paredes López
  - Roberto Meli Piralla
- 1992:
  - Lorenzo Martínez Gómez
  - Gabriel Torres Villaseñor
- 1993: José Ricardo Gómez Romero
- 1994:
  - Francisco José Sánchez Sesma
  - Juan Vázquez Lombera
- 1995: Alfredo Sánchez Marroquín
- 1996:
  - Adolfo Guzmán Arenas
  - María Luisa Ortega Delgado
- 1997:
  - Baltasar Mena Iniesta
  - Feliciano Sánchez Sinencio
- 1999: Jesús González Hernández
- 2000: Francisco Alfonso Larqué Saavedra
- 2001: Filiberto Vázquez Dávila
- 2002: Alexander Balankin
- 2003:
  - Agustín López-Munguía Canales
  - Leonardo Ríos Guerrero
  - Octavio Manero Brito
- 2004:
  - Héctor Mario Gómez Galvarriato
  - Martín Guillermo Hernández Luna
  - Arturo Menchaca
- 2005: Alejandro Alagón Cano
- 2006: Fernando Samaniego Verduzco
- 2007: Miguel Pedro Romo Organista
- 2008: María de los Ángeles Valdés
- 2009:
  - Blanca Elena Jiménez Cisneros
  - José Luis Leyva Montiel
- 2010: Sergio Revah Moiseev
- 2011: Raúl Gerardo Quintero Flores
- 2012: Sergio Antonio Estrada Parra
- 2013: Martín Ramón Aluja Schuneman Hofer
- 2014: José Mauricio López Romero
- 2015:
  - Raúl Rojas
  - Enrique Galindo Fentanes
- 2016:
  - Lourival Possani Postay
  - Luis Enrique Sucar Succar
- 2017: Emilio Sacristan Rock
- 2018:
  - Ricardo Chicurel-Uziel
  - Leticia Myriam Torres Guerra
- 2019:
  - Hugo Barrera Saldaña
  - Yunny Meas Vong
- 2020:
  - Guillermina Ferro Flores
  - Jorge Ancheyta Juárez
- 2021: Refugio Rodríguez Vázquez
- 2022:
  - Gustavo Mora Aguilera
  - Edda Lydia Sciutto Conde
- 2023:
  - Rafael Vázquez Duhalt
  - Juan Socorro Armendáriz Borunda
  - Sergio Román Othón Serna Saldívar
  - Edilso Francisco Reguera Ruiz

== See also ==
- Premio México de Ciencia y Tecnología
- History of science and technology in Mexico
