= Dolores Castro =

Mexican poet (1923–2022)

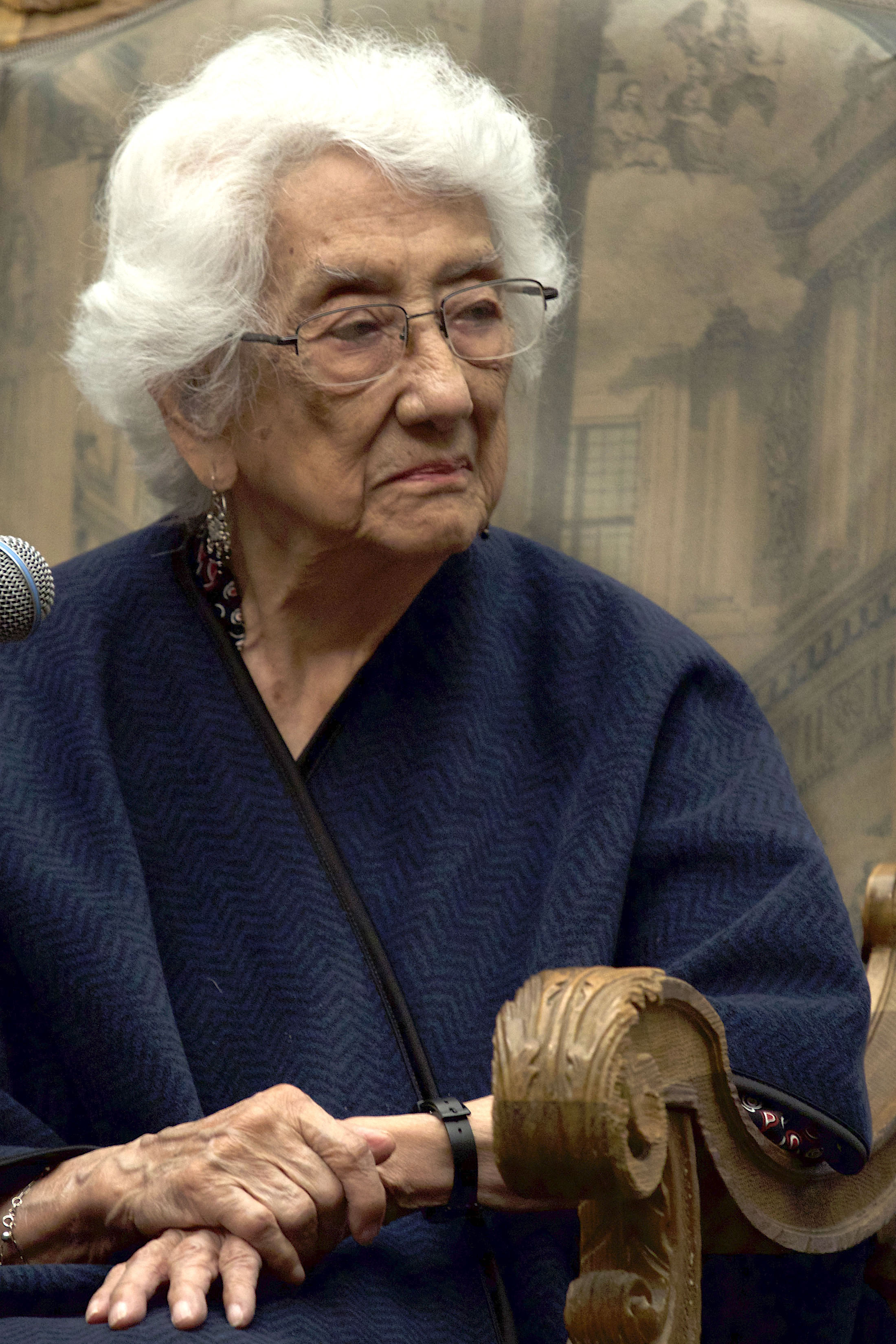
- Born: 12 April 1923; Aguascalientes City, Aguascalientes, Mexico
- Died: 30 March 2022 (aged 98)
- Education: Complutense University of Madrid; National Autonomous University of Mexico
- Occupations: Poet; narrator; essayist; literary critic

Dolores Castro Varela (12 April 1923 – 30 March 2022) was a Mexican poet, narrator, essayist and literary critic.

== Career ==
Castro was a professor of literature at institutions such as the National Autonomous University of Mexico (UNAM), Universidad Iberoamericana (UIA) and Escuela de Periodismo Carlos Septién García. She was a founder of the Facultad de Estudios Superiores Acatlán at UNAM.

She was a founder of Radio UNAM and producer of radio shows. She also hosted the program Poetas de México on Canal 11 with Alejandro Avilés, and collaborated in the direction of Cultural Diffusion of the university.

She served as editor-in-chief and contributor to Barcos de Papel and Poesía de América magazines. She was a member of the editorial board of Summa Bibliographical, Fuensanta, The Word and The Man, Level, Poetry of America, Bibliographic Sum, and the literary magazine of the UIA.

== Awards and honors ==
She won the National Prize for Poetry of Mazatlan in 1980. In 2014 she won the National Prize for Arts and Sciences in the Literature and Linguistics category. In 2008, the INBA paid her a tribute for her 85 years of life, and in 2014, the INBA paid tribute to her with the editorial presentation Dolores Castro, 90 years old: word and time.

Castro was part of the group Eight Mexican Poets, which also included Alejandro Avilés, Roberto Cabral del Hoyo, Javier Peñalosa, Honorato Magaloni Duarte, Efrén Hernández, Octavio Novaro and Rosario Castellanos.

== Published works ==
=== Poems ===
- El corazón transfigurado, 1949
- Dos nocturnos, 1952
- Siete poemas, 1952
- La tierra está sonando, 1959
- Cantares de vela, 1960
- Soles, 1977
- Qué es lo vivido, 1980
- Las palabras, 1990
- Poemas inéditos, 1990
- No es el amor el vuelo, 1992
- Tornasol, 1997
- Sonar en el silencio, 2000
- Oleajes, 2003
- Íntimos huéspedes, 2004
- Algo le duele al aire, 2011
- Viento quebrado, poesía reunida, 2011
- El corazón transfigurado/The Transfigured Heart, 2013
- Sombra domesticada, 2013
- Pozo de Luz, Poetazos, 2013
- Algo le duele al aire/ Something Pains the Wind, 2015

=== Novel ===
- La ciudad y el viento, 1962

=== Essay ===
- Dimensión de la lengua en su función creativa, emotiva y esencial, 1989

=== Anthologies ===
- Obras completas, 1991
- Antología poética en francés, 2003
- A mitad de un suspiro, 2008
- La vida perdurable, antología poética
