= Margarita Nolasco Armas =

Mexican anthropologist

- 1990-1994
- Born: María Margarita Nolasco Armas; 20 November 1932; Orizaba, Veracruz, Mexico
- Died: 23 September 2008 (aged 75); Mexico City, Mexico
- Occupations: ethnologist, anthropologist
- Years active: 1957-2013

Margarita Nolasco Armas (20 November 1932 – 23 September 2008) was a Mexican ethnologist and anthropologist, who pioneered the study of the country's varied people from a cultural rather than national perspective and founded the new facility of the National Museum of Anthropology. She was one of the group of researchers known as "the magnificent seven of (Mexican) anthropology". She was awarded the Ignacio Manuel Altamirano Medal as well as the National Prize for Arts and Sciences for her work in history and philosophy.

== Early life ==
María Margarita Nolasco Armas was born on 20 November 1932 in Orizaba, Veracruz, Mexico to Margarita Armas Hernández, a Canary Islander and Ricardo Nolasco Aguilar, from Veracruz. In her childhood, her family relocated to Mexico City. In high school, she met Carlos Melesio and the two dreamed of becoming medical doctors. They married when Nolasco was seventeen and after the trauma of working with burn victims, she changed her course of study to anthropology. Enrolling in the National School of Anthropology and History (Spanish: Escuela Nacional de Antropología e Historia, (ENAH)) in 1957, she studied under Barbro Dahigren. She graduated with a degree as an ethnologist from ENAH and went on to earn a master's degree and PhD in anthropology at the National Autonomous University of Mexico (UNAM).

== Career ==
Nolasco began her career working at the National Museum of Anthropology in the old building located at #13 Calle de Moneda, as a cataloger and was quickly promoted to a research position at Instituto Nacional de Antropología e Historia (INAH), working her way up the ladder to become the Director of the graduate and post-graduate studies of anthropology at INAH. Throughout her career, besides teaching at ENAH, Nolasco taught at UNAM, the Universidad Iberoamericana Ciudad de México, the University of California, San Diego, and the Complutense University of Madrid. She was awarded the Ignacio Manuel Altamirano Medal from the Secretariat of Public Education in 2000 for her instruction career.

One of Nolasco's first publications was a thorough analysis of land tenure in San Juan Teotihuacán, in Edomex, which she released in 1961. She evaluated the claims of rural agricultural workers and their demands for their land rights to be protected. She was a participant in the aftermath of the Mexican Movement of 1968, going from building to building in search of her son, Juan Carlos. Nolasco focused her studies on peoples which had been little researched before in Mexico, including the Tohono O'odham and Pima and other northern border communities. Nolasco also performed investigations on southern border migrations, working with researchers in Guatemala and Belize. She traveled the country to examine migration patterns of indigenous peoples in Guatemala and expanded her research to include agricultural workers. One of her most noted works, explored coffee production in Mexico. Café y sociedad en México (Coffee and Society in Mexico, 1985), published with a group of researchers she led, is the most complete study of the topic and classically evaluated the production and environmental impact, as well as the socio-economic impact of coffee as an agricultural product of Mexico.

Nolasco belonged to a group of anthropologists collectively known as Los siete magníficos de la anthropología (The magnificent seven of anthropology), which included besides herself: Guillermo Bonfil Batalla, Mercedes Olivera Bustamante, Ángel Palerm, Rodolfo Stavenhagen, Enrique Valencia, and Arturo Warman. They were the first group working in Mexico to focus their attention away from the assimilated national identity of the varied peoples in the country and instead critically evaluate the differences of the cultures that made up the whole. Rather than evaluate a homogeneous Mestizo population, as had been done in the past, this group of researchers pioneered evaluating the cultural contributions of indigenous people and led the way for recognition of the value of indigenous cultures, but also questioning colonialism from the impact on the conquered communities, rather than as a glorification of colonial expansion. Her research specialties focused on ethnography and migration, analyzing the political and human rights issues impacting indigenous peoples and throughout her career published more than 100 articles on these topics.

Nolasco was a founder of the new facility for the National Museum of Anthropology and served as curator of the Ethnography Room of that facility. Nolasco was an honorary member of the Mexican Society of Geography and Statistics and a member of the Mexican Anthropology Society and Mexican Academy of Sciences. Between 2004 and 2006, she served as president of the Mexican Academy of Anthropological Sciences and was a founder of the College of Ethnologists and Social Anthropologists, the governing board of professionals working in the field.

== Death and legacy ==
Nolasco died unexpectedly on 23 September 2008 in Mexico City. She had numerous project which had not yet been completed. That same year, she won the National Prize for Arts and Sciences for her work in history and philosophy, but died before its presentation. She was posthumously honored with the award and was honored in Queretaro with an altar during the Day of the Dead remembrances.
