= Leticia Torres =

Leticia Torres may refer to:

- Leticia Myriam Torres Guerra (born 1955), Mexican chemist
- Leticia Torres (Paralympian) (fl. 1988–2007), Mexican Paralympic athlete
- Leticia Torres (footballer) (born 1994), Chilean football defender
