= Celsa Iuit Moo =

Mexican Mayan artist (b. 1938)

- Born: April 17, 1938 (age 87); Xocchel, Yucatán, Mexico
- Occupations: Handcraft; weaver
- Known for: Henequen weaving
- Awards: 2009 National Prize for Arts

Celsa María Iuit Moo (born April 17, 1938) is a Mexican artisan of Mayan ancestry who works as a weaver of henequen fiber, locally known in the Mayan language as soskil.

== Biography ==
Iuit Moo was born in San Pedro, Xocchel, Yucatán. She is of Mayan heritage. Iuit Moo started weaving henequen fiber when she was 12 years old. The commercialization of her art crafts were important to support his family, most of which works as artisans.

She has showcased her work in Europe, the United States and over 20 Mexican states.

In 1994, Celsa founded the "Mujeres de Xocchel" collective, gathering 24 families to collaboratively produce and sell their handcraft works. She also teaches her technique, focusing on young women.

In 2010 she was part of the 44th annual Smithsonian Folklife Festival in Washington D.C. where she showed visitors how to make crafts with henequen fiber. As part of the same event, she was part of a dinner with President Barack Obama.

In 2024 she was part of the henequen handcraft exhibition at the Museo Nacional de Culturas Populares in Mexico City.

== Technique ==
She works weaving and braiding henequen fiber, which comes from a type of Agave grown in the Mayan lands since prehispanic times. This fiber is normally used to make ropes, sacks and rugs. After dying the fiber with natural dyes she uses different techinques to weave purses, hats, coasters, place mats, figurines and Christmas decorations.

== Awards and recognition ==
In 1992, Iuit Moo was awarded first place at the State Handicrafts Competition in Mérida, a distinction granted by the Directorate of Handicraft Development in recognition of exceptional craftsmanship. In 1994, she received official recognition for participation in the commemorative festivities marking the 127th anniversary of the founding of the city of Ticul.

In 1995, Iuit Moo received the José Tec Poot Award, a distinction jointly bestowed by the Government of the State of Yucatán, the National Fund for the Development of Arts and Crafts (FONART), the Institute of Culture of Yucatán, the National Indigenous Institute, the General Directorate of Popular Cultures, and the Casa de las Artesanías of Mérida. This award recognized outstanding contributions to the preservation and promotion of traditional arts and indigenous heritage.

In 2007, she again achieved first place, this time in the Natural Fibers category of the second State Handicrafts Competition held in Mérida, Yucatán. This recognition was awarded by the Municipality of Mérida in collaboration with FONART, Fomento Cultural Banamex, and the Foundation Haciendas del Mundo Maya.

Iuit Moo was the recipient of the 2009 National Prize for Arts in the Popular Arts and Traditions category, the highest recognition awarded by the Mexican federal government.

In 2019 the Yucatán State Government awarded Iuit Moo with the "Consuelo Zavala Castillo" recognition.
