= Teresa Rojas Rabiela =

Mexican Ethnologist (born 1947)

María Teresa Rojas Rabiela
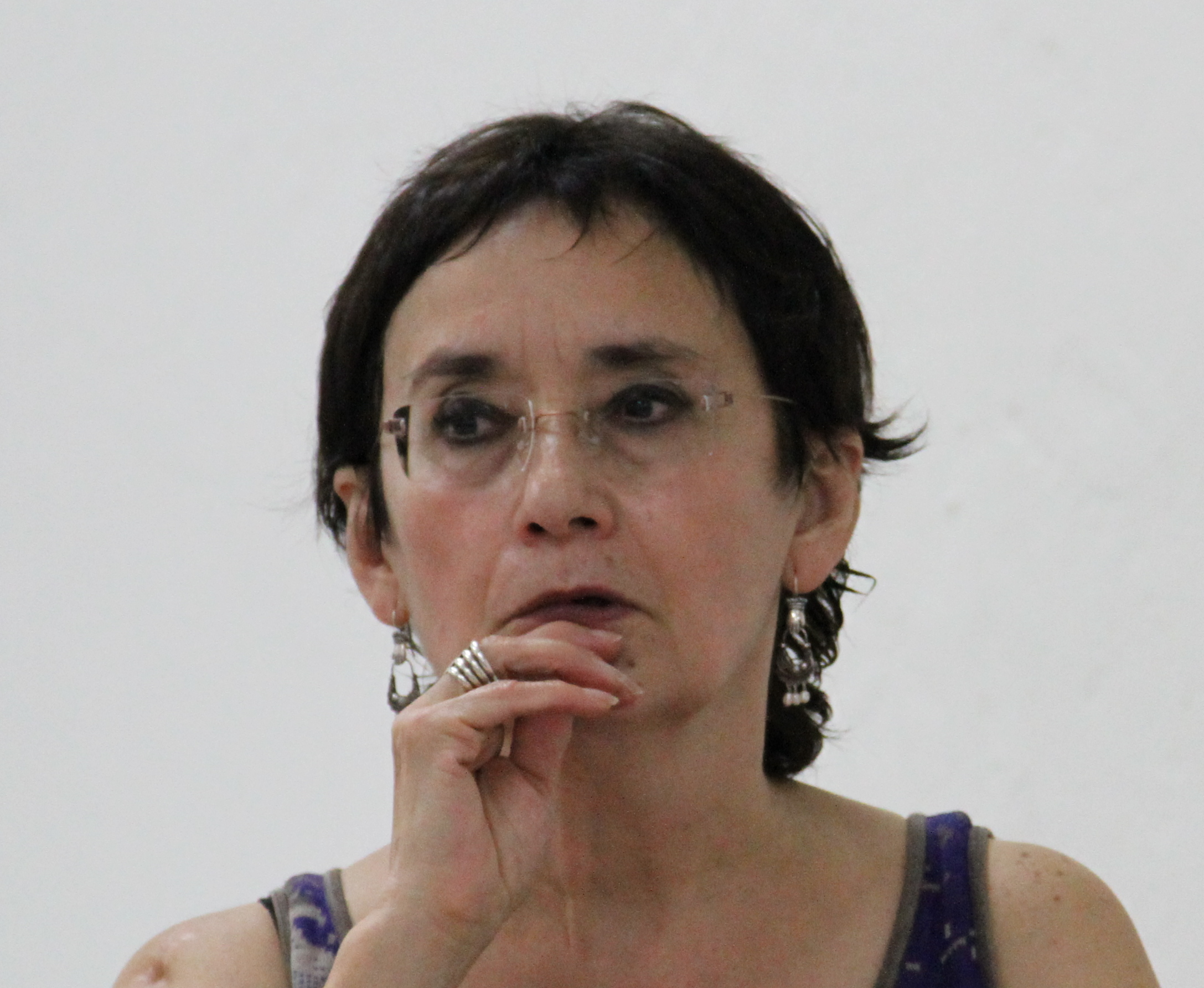
- María Teresa Roja Rabiela (November 22, 2013)
- Born: December 17, 1947 (age 77); Mexico City, Mexico
- Awards: National Prize for Arts and Sciences 2024
- Scientific career
- Fields: Anthropology, Ethnology, Ethnohistory
- Institutions: Centro de Investigaciones y Estudios Superiores en Antropología Social
- Thesis: La agricultura mesoamericana en el siglo XVI (1985)
- Doctoral advisor: Pedro Carrasco

María Teresa Rojas Rabiela (born December 17, 1947) is an ethnologist, ethnohistorian, Emeritus National Researcher, 2024 National Prize for Arts and Sciences, Field III. History, Social Sciences, and Philosophy, Mexico, and Mexican academic, specializing in Chinampas of Mexico's Basin, history of agriculture, hydraulics, technology, and labor organization in Mesoamerica during pre-Columbian and colonial eras, as well as historical photography of Mexico's peasants and indigenous people. She is recognized as a pioneer in historical studies on earthquakes in Mexico. From 2018 to 2021, Rojas Rabiela was involved in the restoration of the section of the pre-Hispanic aqueduct of Tetzcotzinco, Texcoco, known as El caño quebrado (the broken pipe).

== Education and academia ==
Rabiela obtained her bachelor's degree in ethnology from Escuela Nacional de Antropología e Historia, Mexico, with her thesis Aspectos tecnológicos de las obras hidráulicas en el Valle de México (English: Technological Aspects of Hydraulic Works in the Valley of Mexico) under the direction of Ángel Palerm; before acquiring her master's degree at the same institution. She received her doctoral degree from Universidad Iberoamericana, with the thesis La agricultura mesoamericana en el siglo XVI (English: Mesoamerican Agriculture in the 16th century), directed by Pedro Carrasco. She studied under Guillermo Bonfil Batalla, Ángel Palerm Vich, Pedro Armillas, Pedro Carrasco and William T. Sanders.

In 1973, she was appointed research professor at Centro de Investigaciones y Estudios Superiores en Antropología Social (English: Higher Anthropology Research and Studies Center, CIESAS, for its acronym in Spanish), and its CEO from 1990 to 1996.

== Career ==
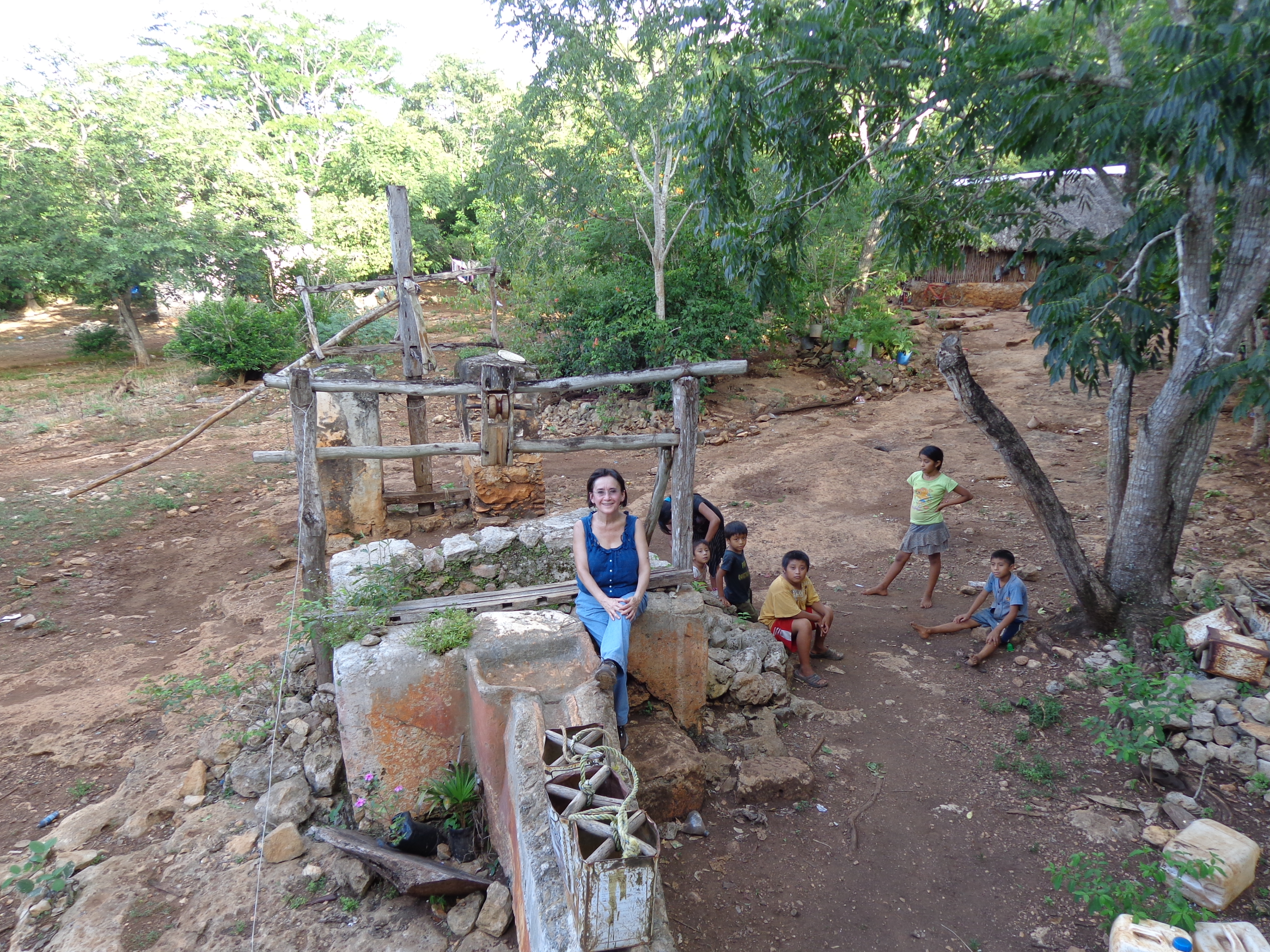
Doctor Rojas Rabiela visiting a well and a waterwheel in San Marcelino, Yucatán, Mx

Rojas Rabiela has held managerial, advisory, academic and representative positions at Centro de Investigaciones y Estudios Superiores en Antropología Social, Mexico; Foro Consultivo Científico y Tecnológico (Scientific and Technological Consultative Forum) Mexico; Academia Mexicana de Ciencias (Mexican Academy of Science); Colegio de Etnólogos y Antropólogos Sociales (Ethnologists and Social Anthropologists Society) Mexico; Sistema Nacional de Investigadores (National System of Researchers) Mexico; the UNAM Instituto de Investigaciones Antropológicas (Institute of Anthropological Research-UNAM); the Archivo General de la Nación (Nation's General Archive) Mexico; Universidad Iberoamericana, El Colegio de México, El Colegio de San Luis and El Colegio de Michoacán.

Rojas Rabiela is the Water's Historical Archive's founder (National Water Commission, Mexico) and has directed the Agrarian General Archive project development (CIESAS- Registro Nacional Agrario, Mexico).

She has been editor of Historia de los Pueblos Indígenas de México (Mexico's Indigenous Peoples History) collection (twenty four volumes) with Mario Humberto Ruz Sosa, CIESAS – Comisión Nacional para el Desarrollo de los Pueblos Indígenas, Mexico; of Colección Agraria ( Agrarian Collection, seventeen volumes) CIESAS-Registro Nacional Agrario, Mexico; of Serie Biografías of Colegio de Etnólogos y Antropólogos Sociales; and the "Iconografía de la Luz" (Iconography of Light) photolibrary Nacho López electronic catalog, with Ignacio Gutiérrez Ruvalcaba, CIESAS-CDI in fifty five volumes.

Since 1987 she has been a member of the Mexican Academy of Sciences.

In 2025 Rojas Rabiela was awarded the 2024 National Prize for Arts and Sciences in the History, Social Sciences, and Philosophy category.

== Awards ==
- Francisco Javier Clavijero Award, for best doctoral thesis in history and ethnohistory, INAH, Mexico, 1985.
- Scientific Research Award , Social Sciences category, Mexican Academy of Sciences, Mexico, 1987.
- Arnaldo Orfila Reynal Award in university publishing, Social Sciences category, University of Guadalajara, Mexico, 1995.
- Manuel Rodríguez Lapuente Medal in Social Sciences, University of Guadalajara, Mexico, 2003.
- Academic Medal, Mexican Society for the History of Science and Technology, Mexico, 2004.
- INNOVA Recognition, Nacho López Photo Archive, National Institute of Indigenous Peoples, Mexico, 2005.
- Diploma for studies on the chinampas and their culture, Government of Mexico City, 2016.
- Recognition from the Institute of Historical Research of the Michoacana University of San Nicolás de Hidalgo, for contributions to the development of academic programs of significant institutional value, Universidad Michoacana de San Nicolás de Hidalgo, Mexico, 2017.
- Recognition for influence on several generations of researchers in ethnobiology and environmental history, Mexican Society of Ethnology, 2018.
- Mention of Merit for work in the safeguarding and organization of archives, XVIII Citibanamex “Atanasio G. Saravia” Award for Mexican Regional History 2018–2019.
- Distinction as National Emeritus Researcher, awarded by the General Council of the National System of Researchers, Consejo Nacional de Humanidades, Ciencias y Tecnologías, Mexico, 2022.
- National Prize for Arts and Sciences in the History, Social Sciences, and Philosophy category, Mexico, 2024.

== Publications ==
=== Books ===
- Rojas Rabiela, Teresa (1985). La cosecha del agua. Pesca, caza de aves y recolección de otros productos biológicos acuáticos en la Cuenca de México] [The water harvest. Fishing, bird hunting and collection of other aquatic biological products in the Basin of Mexico] (in Spanish). Mexico: SEP Cultura – Centro de Investigaciones y Estudios Superiores en Antropología Social (CIESAS).
- Rojas Rabiela, Teresa (1987). Glantz, Susana (ed.). El trabajo de los indios de la ciudad de México: 1521–1600, en La heterodoxia recuperada [The work of the Indians of Mexico City: 1521–1600, in The recovered heterodoxy] (in Spanish). Mexico: Fondo de Cultura Económica.
- Rojas Rabiela, Teresa (1988). Las siembras de ayer. La agricultura indígena del siglo XVI [Yesterday's plantings. The indigenous agriculture of the 16th century] (in Spanish). Mexico: CIESAS-SEP.
- Rojas Rabiela, Teresa (1999–2004). Vidas y bienes olvidados. Testamentos indígenas novohispanos [Forgotten lives and goods. New Spanish indigenous wills] (in Spanish). Mexico City: CIESAS, Consejo Nacional de Ciencia y Tecnología (CONACyT) Secretaría de Gobernación, Archivo General de la Nación.
- Rojas Rabiela, Teresa; Martínez Ruiz, José Luis; Murillo Licea, Daniel (2009). Cultura hidráulica y simbolismo mesoamericano del agua en el México prehispánico [Hydraulic culture and Mesoamerican symbolism of water in pre-Hispanic Mexico.] (PDF) (in Spanish). Mexico: CIESAS – Instituto Mexicano de Tecnología del Agua (IMTA) – Cátedra UNESCO-IMTA.
- Rojas Rabiela, Teresa; Gutiérrez Rubalcaba, Ignacio (2013). Cien ventanas a los paisajes de antaño: fotografías del campo mexicano de hace un siglo [One hundred windows to the landscapes of yesteryear: photographs of the Mexican countryside from a century ago] (in Spanish). Mexico: CONACyT – Red de Etnoecología y Patrimonio Biocultural, Juan Pablos Editor.
- Rojas Rabiela, Teresa; Bonfil Batalla, Guillermo; Pérez Montfort, Ricardo (2018). Corridos, trovas y bolas de la región de Amecameca-Cuautla. Colección de don Miguelito [Corridos, trovas and bolas from the Amecameca-Cuautla region. Don Miguelito’s collection] (in Spanish). Mexico: Fondo de Cultura Económica.
- Herrera, Alfonso L.; Ricardo E., Cicero (2018). Rojas Rabiela, Teresa; Gutiérrez Rubalcaba, Ignacio (eds.). Catálogo de la Colección de Antropología del Museo Nacional (1895) [Catalog of the Anthropology Collection of the National Museum, (1895)] (in Spanish). Mexico: Secretaría de Cultura, INAH – CIESAS. ISBN 9786075392141.
- Rojas Rabiela, Teresa; Gutiérrez Rubalcaba, Ignacio (2019). Las presas efímeras mexicanas, del pasado y del presente [Mexican ephemeral dams, past and present.] (in Spanish). Mexico: UNAM – CIESAS. ISBN 9786073026222.
