= Héctor Mario Gómez Galvarriato =

Mexican chemical engineer (1937–2023)

- Born: 29 June 1937; Tecuala, Nayarit, Mexico
- Died: 16 February 2023 (aged 85)
- Education: ESIQIE; Instituto Panamericano de Alta Dirección de Empresa
- Scientific career
- Fields: Chemical engineering
- Workplaces: National Polytechnic Institute; National Autonomous University of Mexico; Instituto Panamericano de Alta Dirección de Empresa; Instituto Tecnológico Autónomo de México

Héctor Mario Gómez Galvarriato (29 June 1937 – 16 February 2023) was a Mexican chemical engineer, professor and businessman. He had five technological patents, developed coatings and waterproofing for the construction industry, as well as an additive that increases the resistance of cement by 20%.

== Early life and education ==
Gómez was born in Tecuala, Nayarit on 29 June 1937. He completed his undergraduate degree at the Higher School of Chemical Engineering and Extractive Industries (ESIQIE) of the National Polytechnic Institute (IPN) where he obtained his degree as an industrial chemical engineer. He completed a diploma in business administration from the Instituto Panamericano de Alta Dirección de Empresa (IPADE).

Gómez had taught various courses and conferences at the National Polytechnic Institute, at the National Autonomous University of Mexico, at the Pan-American Institute of High Business Management, at the Instituto Tecnológico Autónomo de México (ITAM), at the National Chamber of the Transformation Industry (Canacintra) and in various companies.

== Career ==
Gómez's contributions to the construction industry have been coatings and waterproofing, styrene-styrene synthetic resins, epoxy and polyurethane to refine asphalt. On the other hand, he developed an additive that allows to increase the resistance of the cement by 20%, which was adopted by the company Cementos Mexicanos (Cemex).

In 1967, Gómez founded the company Imperquimia, in addition to having five technological patents, it manufactures more than two hundred products for the building construction and maintenance sector. He was a member of the Science Advisory Council of the Presidency of the Republic.

== Death ==
Gómez died on 16 February 2023, at the age of 85.

== Awards and honors ==
In 2004, Gómez received the National Prize for Arts and Sciences in the Technology and Design category.
