= Rafael Palacios =

Rafael Palacios may refer to:

- Rafael Palacios (priest), Roman Catholic El Salvadoran priest
- Rafael Palacios (artist), Puerto Rican-American artist and mapmaker
- Rafael Palacios de la Lama (scientist), Mexican molecular biologist and member of the U.S. National Academy of Sciences
