= Cecilia Noguez =

Mexican physicist

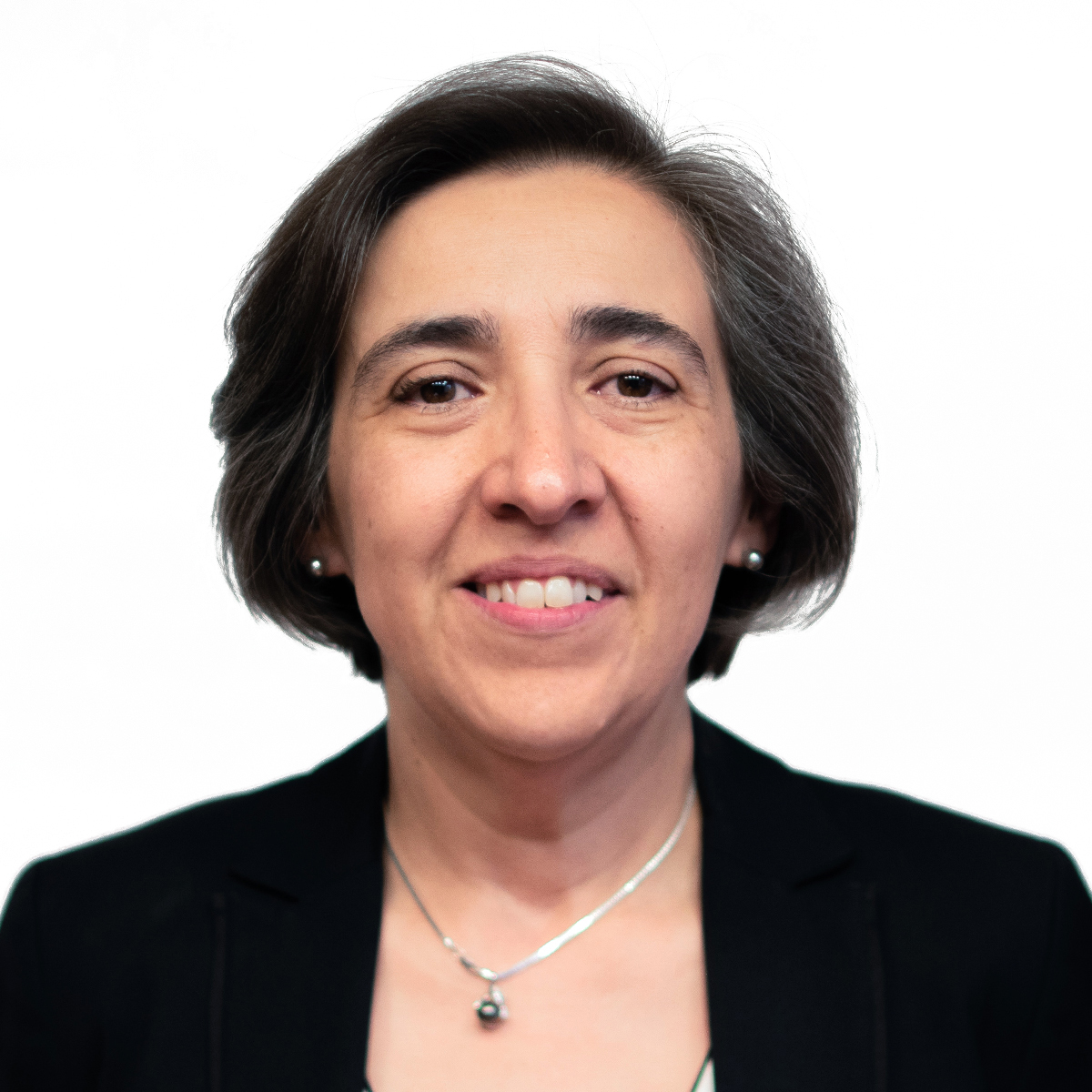
- Born: Ana Cecilia Noguez Garrido; July 17, 1966 (age 60); Mexico City, Mexico
- Education: Universidad Nacional Autónoma de México (BS, MS, PhD)
- Awards: National Prize for Arts and Sciences (2016)
- Scientific career
- Fields: Physics, Plasmonics, Nanoscience
- Workplaces: Instituto de Física, Universidad Nacional Autónoma de México
- Doctoral advisor: Ruben Gerardo Barrera

Notes
- She was the first female director of the Institute of Physics UNAM

Ana Cecilia Noguez Garrido (born July 17, 1966) is a Mexican physicist, professor, and science communicator; she is a researcher and was the first female director of the Institute of Physics of the National Autonomous University of Mexico from 2019 to 2023. Cecilia Noguez specializes in the interaction of light with matter on a nanometric scale. In 2016, she was awarded with the National Prize for Arts and Sciences.

== Education and early career ==
In May 1990, Ana Cecilia Noguez obtained her bachelor's degree in physics at the Faculty of Sciences of the National Autonomous University of Mexico (UNAM). Since then, she has been working with the optical properties of mediums composed of nanoparticles. In 1993 and 1995, she obtained a master's degree and a doctorate in physics, respectively, also at UNAM. As part of her PhD, Noguez spent a research stay for over one year at the University of Rome II. From July 1995 to 1996, she had a postdoctoral residency at Ohio University's Department of Physics and Astronomy. During her PhD, she also studied the optical response of semiconductor crystal surfaces.

== Career ==
In 1996, Cecilia Noguez joined the Institute of Physics of UNAM, where she continues to work today. She was designated as director of the Institute of Physics for the period 2019–2023, becoming the first woman to hold the position. Along with her research work, Cecilia Noguez teaches in both undergraduate and graduate programs at UNAM. She is a member of the Sistema Nacional de Investigadores (since 1994), the Mexican Academy of Sciences, and the Advisory Council of Sciences of the Presidency of the Republic.

Noguez has conducted theoretical and computational research to study the interaction between light and matter at the nanometer scale. Particularly, she has made contributions in order to understand how the geometry, size, composition, and the medium surrounding a nanoparticle influence its optical properties. Her work is mainly concentrated in areas such as plasmonics and surface physics. Her studies have contributed to the development of plasmonic nanostructures and two-dimensional films for the control of their optical activity. Noguez's scientific contributions to the study of optical properties and surface plasmons of metallic nanoparticles had been recognized in different occasion. For example, her work titled “Surface Plasmons on Metal Nanoparticles: The Influence of Shape and Physical Environment”, published on the Journal of Physical Chemistry C, was recognized as the Mexican paper in physics written by one author with more cites.

Cecilia Noguez has dedicated part of her trajectory to promote nanoscience in Mexico; she was part of the organization of the first network of nanoscience at UNAM (REGINA). Besides, she contributed to establish the Nanoscience Division of the Physical Mexican Society and the National Network of Nanoscience and Nanotechnology of CONACYT. She has also participated in activities aimed to promote science among general public. In 2018, she participated as a mentor for the initiative "Niñas STEM, pueden" (STEM Girls, They Can).

== Awards and distinctions ==
- 1996: Gabino Barreda Medal in the UNAM doctorate program
- 1996: Weizmann Award for PhD thesis from the Mexican Academy of Sciences
- 2006: UNAM Distinction for Young Academics
- 2009: Research Award in Exact Sciences from the Mexican Academy of Sciences
- 2009: Thomson Reuters/CINVESTAV Award
- 2010: Heberto Castillo Martínez Capital City Award from the government of Mexico City
- 2016: National Prize for Arts and Sciences in Natural Sciences
- 2018: Honorary doctorate from UAEM

== Selected publications ==
- Sosa, Iván O.; Noguez, Cecilia; Barrera, Ruben G. (2003). "Optical Properties of Metal Nanoparticles with Arbitrary Shapes". The Journal of Physical Chemistry B. 107 (26): 6269–6275. arXiv:cond-mat/0304216. doi:10.1021/jp0274076. S2CID 16621634.
- Noguez, Cecilia (2007). "Surface Plasmons on Metal Nanoparticles: The Influence of Shape and Physical Environment". The Journal of Physical Chemistry C. 111 (10): 3806–3819. doi:10.1021/jp066539m.
- Noguez, Cecilia; Garzón, Ignacio L. (2009). "Optically active metal nanoparticles". Chemical Society Reviews. 38 (3): 757–771. doi:10.1039/B800404H. PMID 19322468.
