= Leocadia Cruz Gómez =

Mexican artist and loomer (b. 1929)

- Born: December 9, 1929 (age 96)
- Other name: Tía Cayita
- Occupations: Artist; weaver
- Known for: Backstrap loom weaving
- Awards: National Prize for Arts and Sciences (2006)

Leocadia Cruz Gómez (born December 9, 1929) also known as Tía Cayita, is a Mexican artisan from Cosoleacaque, Veracruz. Of Nahua descent, she is known for her experience with the pre-Hispanic backstrap loom weaving technique (Spanish: telar de cintura).

== Life ==
She began learning to weave at the age of eight under her mother's guidance. When she was seventeen, she began teaching her looming craft to others.

Her work includes traditional garments such as sashes (Spanish: fajas), underskirts (Spanish: refajos), embroidered blouses, shawls (Spanish: rebozos), jorongos, sarapes, purses, priestly stoles and tablecloths with geometric figures. Her work is part of the collections of the Institute of Anthropology at the Universidad Veracruzana and the Banco Nacional de México. She was featured on a special edition of the journal Arqueología Mexicana. Her work has been exported to the United States, Spain, París and Rome.

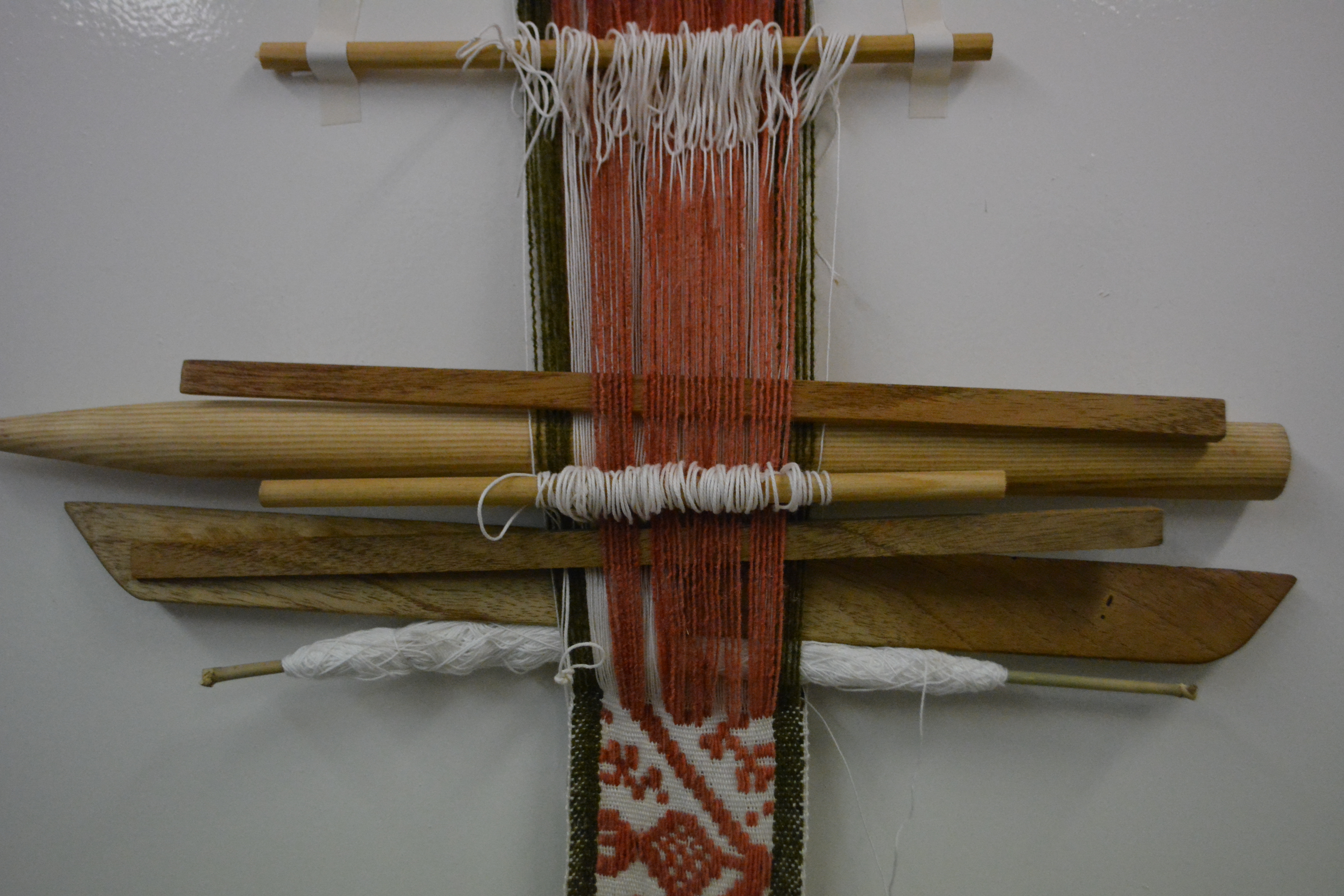

Besides her work as an artist, Leocadia has also advocated for cultural education. The lack of raw materials in the region has led to the backstrap loom technique being practiced by only a few artisans, mostly women. She has taught over 1,300 students through workshops organized by institutions like the Asociación de Amigos del Museo de Arte Popular, the National Institute for Social Development (Spanish: Instituto Nacional de Desarrollo Social), and the Unidad Regional Acayucan de Culturas Populares. She also works with local institutions, such as the regularly classes she gives at the DIF center in Cosoleacaque, Veracruz.

In 2006, the Mexican Government gave recognition to her work and efforts to sustain and promote indigenous textile traditions, honoring Leocadia with the National Prize for Arts and Sciences in the category of Arts and Popular Traditions. The prize is the highest distinction the federal government awards to individuals.

She founded the Nigan Tonogue Cultural Center (Spanish: Centro Cultural Nigan Tonogue) in 2006, in Cosoleacaque, Veracruz. The name means 'Here we are' in Nahuatl.

== Awards and recognition ==
Leocadia has received various recognitions and awards, including:

- Recognition for her participation in the Workshop on Organization for Artisans, held in Zaragoza, Veracruz, awarded in 1999 by the General Directorate of Popular Cultures, the then National Institute of Indigenous Peoples, and the Veracruz Institute of Culture.
- In November 1998, the State Secretariat of Culture of Michoacán granted her a recognition for her participation in the Second Interstate Gathering of Women Artisans.
- In August 2000, the Program for the Support of Municipal and Community Cultures (PACMYC) awarded her a recognition for her support as an instructor in the Children’s Workshops.
- In 2006, she was awarded the National Prize for Arts and Sciences in the category of Arts and Popular Traditions.
- In 2023 she was given the 'Lifetime achievement Award' of the National Grand Prize for Folk Art (Spanish: Gran Premio Nacional de Arte Popular).
- At the Cultural Pavilion of Cosoleacaque, there is a sculpture in her honor, depicting her working in a loom.
