= Taller Leñateros =

Mayan cultural society (e. 1975)

Taller Leñateros is a cultural society and an alliance of Maya and mestizo women and men. Mexican poet Ambar Past founded it in 1975. Taller Leñateros promotes longstanding Indigenous practices of dyeing and papermaking techniques, as well as preserving, supporting, and disseminating Maya and related Indigenous popular culture and oral history.

The publishing collective creates books written, illustrated, printed, and bound — in paper of their own making — by Maya people. It employs local artists to make eco-friendly recycled paper and print and bind original artists’ books containing Maya songs, poetry, and stories in multiple languages.

Taller Leñateros has contributed significantly to the increased visibility of women writers during the boom femenino.

In 2022, it received the National Prize for Arts in the Popular arts and traditions category.

== See also ==
- amatl, figbark paper
