= Emilio Sacristan Rock =

Mexican researcher, inventor and businessman (born 1965)

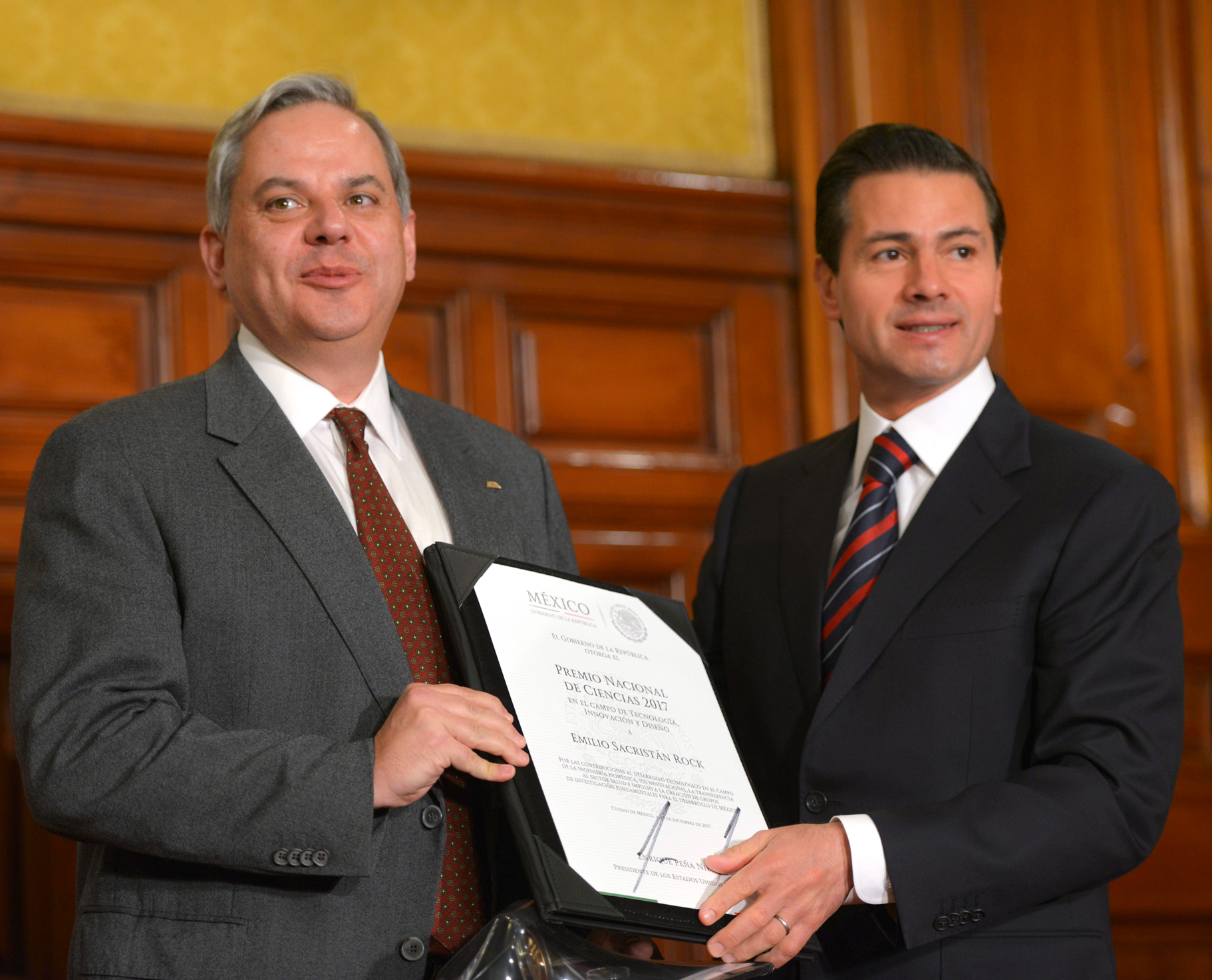
Emilio Sacristan Rock receiving Science National Prize 2017.

Emilio Sacristan Rock (born November 7, 1965) is a Mexican researcher, inventor and businessman in the field of medical technology. He is professor of electrical and biomedical engineering, Director and Founder of the National Center for Medical Instrumentation and Imaging Research, CI3M, at the UAM-Iztapalapa, Mexico City, and Mexican National Researcher level III. He holds a B.S. (1987) in EE and M.S. (1990) and Ph.D. (1993) degrees in biomedical engineering from Worcester Polytechnic Institute. He has been research assistant professor at WPI (1993–1995), associate researcher at University of Massachusetts Medical School (1988-1995), and visiting professor at Yale School of Medicine (2001–2002) and Stanford University (2009). His research focuses on instrumentation for anesthesia and critical care as well as Magnetic Resonance Imaging, and is author of over 70 research articles and 22 international patents. Sacristan is also an entrepreneur seeking to translate medical innovations to the market, having been founder/CEO/CSO of Enviva Corp. (MA), Innovamedica (Mexico), Abdeo Medical (Mexico and CA), Critical Perfusion Inc. (CA), and is Chief Science Officer of Nervive, Inc.(OH). He is the Inventor of the VITACOR UVAD artificial heart, the aspiration condenser for anesthesia, the gastric impedance monitor for critical care, the VITALFLOW magnetic stimulator for stroke therapy, among other medical devices. He is an Endeavor entrepreneur since 2004 and he was honored as American Express Entrepreneur of the Year 2006.

Rock won the National Prize for Arts and Sciences of Mexico in 2017.
