= Mercedes de la Garza =

Mexican historian (b. 1939)

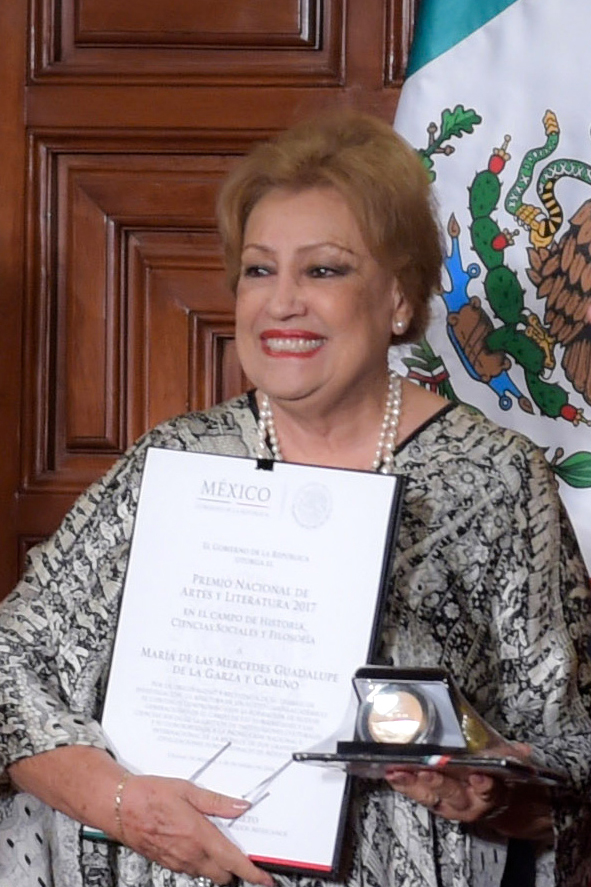
- Born: February 12, 1939 (age 87)
- Occupation: Historian
- Years active: 1967-
- Known for: Nahua civilization; Mayan civilization
- Board member of: Academia Mexicana de la Historia; Academia Mexicana de Ciencias
- Awards: National Prize for Arts and Sciences

Academic background
- Education: National Autonomous University of Mexico

Academic work
- Discipline: Historian
- Sub-discipline: Prehispanic cultures
- Institutions: Instituto de Investigaciones Filológicas

María de las Mercedes Guadalupe de la Garza Camino (born February 12, 1939) is a Mexican writer, historian, researcher and academic, known for her research on pre-Columbian Mesoamerican cultures, particularly the Maya and Nahua civilizations.

== Academia ==
De la Garza earned bachelor's degrees in Spanish Literature (1957–1962) and History (1967–1971) from the National Autonomous University of Mexico (UNAM). At UNAM she obtained a master's degree in Mexican History (1971–1973) and a Ph.D. in history (1977–1979). She also did postgraduate courses at several institutions such as the Complutense University, the University of Toulouse, Pennsylvania State University, and Rey Juan Carlos University. She studied at UNAM under Luis Villoro, Eduardo Nicol and Miguel León-Portilla.

Since 1973, she has taught courses on Maya and Nahua cultures at UNAM's School of Philosophy and Letters. She has also lectured at various institutions, including the National Museum of Anthropology, the Escuela Nacional de Antropología e Historia and the Ibero-American University in Mexico City, and Casa América in Madrid. De la Garza has supervised over 25 theses at the bachelor's, master's, and doctoral levels and served on more than 40 professional examination committees. She helped establishing the master's and doctoral programs in Mesoamerican Studies at UNAM.

De la Garza served as the director of UNAM's the Maya Studies Center (Spanish: Centro de Estudios Mayas) between 1977 and 1990, and the Institute of Philological Research (Spanish: Instituto de Investigaciones Filológicas) between 2001 and 2009. She also directed the National Museum of Anthropology between 1997 and 2000.

De la Garza's research focuses on the history, religion, art, and literature of the Maya and Nahua civilizations. She has authored 27 books and over 200 articles and book chapters, published in Mexico and internationally. Her work has been featured in countries such as Spain, France, the Netherlands, Germany, England, Russia, the United States, and Venezuela.

In 1985, she created the International Congress of Mayan Culture, which is organized every 3 years by UNAM's Maya Studies Center (Spanish: Centro de Estudios Mayas) of the Institute of Philological Research (Spanish: Instituto de Investigaciones Filológicas).

She has curated several exhibitions, both national and international, including "Vida y muerte, arte funerario del Occidente de México" in Spain (1998), "I Maya", in Venice (1998–1999), "Los Mayas" at the Antiguo Colegio de San Ildefonso (1999), and "Mayas. Revelación de un tiempo sin fin," which was displayed at the National Palace in Mexico (2013), as well as in Brazil, Paris, and Liverpool.

She's a full time researcher at the Maya Studies Center of the Institute of Philological Research.

== Memberships ==
She is a member of the Mexican Society of Anthropology, the Association of Latin American and Caribbean Historians, the Mexican Society of the History and Philosophy of Medicine, the Spanish Society of Maya Studies, the Mexican Society for the History of Religions, the Mexican Society of Bibliophiles, and the European Society of Culture. She was a founding member of the International Society for Human Values.

Since 1997, she has been a member of the Mexican Academy of Sciences.

She entered the Mexican Academy of History in 2005, as chair member number 6. The response of her acceptance speech was given by Miguel León-Portilla. She became an emeritus member in 2022.

== Awards and Recognitions ==
Since 1984, she has been a member of the National System of Researchers (SNI), Level III, and in 1999, she was awarded the title of emeritus Researcher.

In 2017 she was awarded the National Prize for Arts and Sciences, the highest recognition awarded by the Mexican Government, in the History, Social Sciences, and Philosophy category.

In 2017 her alma mater the National Autonomous University of Mexico awarded her with an honorary doctoral degree in recognition of his contributions to academia.

She was also awarded the Jean Racine Medal from the French Alliance of Mexico in 1966, the Gabino Barreda Medal from UNAM in 1983 and the National University Award for Teaching in Humanities from UNAM in 1995.

== Selected publications ==
- El hombre en el pensamiento religioso náhuatl y maya (1972)
- La conciencia histórica de los antiguos mayas (1975)
- Literatura maya (1980)
- El universo sagrado de la serpiente entre los mayas (1984)
- Rostros de lo sagrado en el mundo maya (1998)
- El legado escrito de los mayas (2012)
- Sueño y éxtasis: visión chamánica de los nahuas y los mayas (2012)
- Los mayas. Tres mil años de civilización (2015)
- El tiempo de los dioses-tiempo. Concepciones de Mesoamérica (2015)
- El poder de las plantas sagradas en el universo maya (2019)
