= Marcos Rojkind Matlyuk =

Mexican physician and university teacher (1935-2011)

Marcos Rojkind Matluk
- Born: July 29, 1935; Mexico City, Mexico
- Died: September 10, 2011 (aged 76); Washington, D.C., United States
- Education: National Autonomous University of Mexico
- Occupations: Physician, professor
- Awards: National Prize for Arts and Sciences (1985)

Marcos Rojkind Matlyuk (July 29, 1935 in Mexico City – September 10, 2011 in Washington, DC) known as Marcos Rojkind, was a professor, doctor, inventor of biotechnology, expert on hepatic fibrosis and winner of the National Prize for Arts and Sciences (Mexico). He taught at the Albert Einstein College of Medicine‘s Marion Bessin Liver Research Center. When he died, Rojkind was Professor of Biochemistry, Molecular Biology and Pathology at the George Washington University Medical Center.

== History ==
His “research was focused on the molecular mechanisms in which alcohol and its metabolites induce liver fibrosis and cirrhosis... the role of laminins in the cell surface adhesion proteins in the amalgamation of tumor invasion and metastasis"

Rojkind graduated from the Medical School at the National Autonomous University of Mexico. In 1962, he received a scholarship from the Helen Hay Witney Foundation that allowed him to study biochemistry under Paul M. Gallop at the Albert Einstein College of Medicine in New York.

When he returned to Mexico, he worked for the pathology department at UNAM and for the Biochemistry Department at the National Institute of Nutrition. He spent ten years at CINVESTAV before moving on to teach classes in biochemistry, molecular biology and pathology at GW.

At the time of his death, he had been living with his wife Patricia Greenwell in Bethesda, Maryland. His youngest child is architect Michael Rojkind.
