= Sergio Román Othón Serna Saldívar =

Sergio Román Othón Serna Saldívar is a full-time professor and researcher with the Monterrey Institute of Technology and Higher Education (Tec de Monterrey) who specializes in food science. His work has been recognized with Level III membership in Mexico's Sistema Nacional de Investigadores and various awards.

== Education ==
Serna holds a BS in agricultural and zoological sciences from the Tec de Monterrey, Campus Monterrey (1980), as well as a master's in nutrition and a doctorate in food science in technology from Texas A&M University.

== Career ==
Serna began his career as a professor and researcher with Texas A&M, with which he is still an adjunct. His career experience includes the milling of grain and oil-producing seeds, the making of bread and tortillas, soft drink production, development of pharmaceuticals, and book reviews. He has worked and consulted for Mexican and international businesses and agencies such as the National Food Research Center in Rio de Janeiro, Brazil, SUSTAIN (US Agency for International Development), Gamesa, GIMSA, Química SUMEX, Omega Tech and other organizations related to food and nutrition.

Serna permanently returned to Mexico under a repatriation program for Mexican scientists sponsored by the federal agency CONACyT and worked as a professor at the University of Sonora before his current position.

Currently, Serna is a professor and researcher with the Tec de Monterrey, Monterrey Campus. His research work is done as part of the Cátedra de Alimentos y Fármacos research group and the Centro de Biotecnología of Tec de Monterrey. He is also the director of the Centro de Investigación y Desarrollo de Proteínas (CIDPRO). As a professor, he has mentored over 60 master's level students and seven doctoral students with their theses.

His research specialties are the processing of cereals and oil-producing seeds, the extraction of phytochemicals for medicinal use and fermentation enzyme biotechnology. He has published seven books, 29 book chapters, 98 articles in peer-reviewed journals, and eight encyclopedia articles. He holds two patents, with eight more requested. He also developed a type of winter wheat used in the United States.

== Awards and recognition ==
Serna is a holder of two patents in the United States: agave syrup extract having anticancer activity (US 20130209588), with Janet Alejandra Gutierrez Uribe and Liliana Santo Zea; and a method for obtaining bioethanol from sorghum grain (sorghum bicolor L. Moench) comprising steps involving decortication and hydrolysis with proteases (20110014671) with Esther Perez Carrillo and Mario Moises Alvarez.

He has been granted membership in the Sociedad Latinoamericana de Nutrición, the American Association of Cereal Chemists, the USA Wheat Quality Council, the Institute of Food Technologists and the Academia Mexicana de Ciencias. Serna holds Level III membership in Mexico's Sistema Nacional de Investigadores, of which he has been a member since 1992.

Serna won the Luis Elizondo National Award in 2003 and the Yum Kax Award in 2008 for his work with lime-treated corn and the AgroBio México Award in 2012. From 1993 to 1998, he won various recognitions from the Tec de Monterrey for his teaching and research work. In 2004, he placed first in the Rómulo Garza Prize for "Efecto de la adición de amiloglucosidasa en las propiedades de cervezas lager producidas a partir de sorgo", coauthored with Diana Urías Lugo, David del Pozo Insfrán and Carmen Hernández Brenes, with third place in research and place in book publication in the same event in 2010.

In 2024 he was awarded the 2023 National Prize for Arts and Sciences in the Technology and Design category, the highest distinction awarded by the Mexican Government.

== See also ==
- List of Monterrey Institute of Technology and Higher Education faculty
