= Andrés Vega Delfín =

Mexican musician (1931–2024)

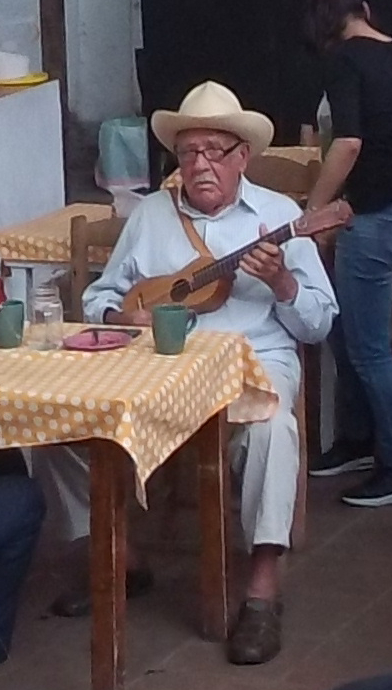
- Born: 24 February 1931; Boca de la Sierra, Veracruz, Mexico
- Died: 9 May 2024 (aged 93)

Andrés Vega Delfín (24 February 1931 – 9 May 2024), nicknamed El Güero Vega, was a Mexican folk musician, recognized for being the requintista of the son jarocho group Mono Blanco, considered one of the most influential musicians of this genre and head of the Vega family, recognized by musicians who composed it. Both the Vega and Utrera families were awarded the National Prize for Arts and Sciences in the Popular Arts and Traditions category.

== Biography ==
Vega learned to play by accompanying his father, Mario Vega Peréz, and by taking his instruments to practice and play, as well as by listening to other older musicians. In 1950, at the age of 18, he arrived at Boca de San Miguel before marrying his wife Hermelinda Hernández Velázquez. Apart from being a musician, he dedicated himself to many other jobs, he was a muleteer, a sailor on a commercial boat in Tlacotalpan, a farmer and a charcoal seller. Since 1980, he was part of Mono Blanco along with his sons José Tereso and Octavio.

=== Fandango ===
As a musician, Vega learned, organized and attended many fandangos in Saltabarranca, Villa Lerdo, Tlacotalpan. Also, as part of his presentations, he directed fandangos throughout Mexico and in the United States.

=== Mono Blanco ===
In 1980, Vega attended a festival in Tlacotalpan with his son Tereso and, playing together with the Casarines, they won the contest. Two days later, the three winning groups went to Xalapa for an interview for television and Gilberto Gutiérrez, who led the group. Some time later, Gutiérrez went to look for Vega at his house to offer him to be the one to play the son guitar in the group, in which the latter accepted. Together with the group he toured various countries such as England, Spain, Morocco, Malaysia, India, France, North Korea, Cuba, Canada, El Salvador, Portugal, Venezuela, Brazil, South Africa, Australia, Switzerland, Belgium, Germany, China, Japan and United States multiple times, playing at festivals and working with the communities of Mexican origin. On 30 October 2017, Vega accompanied the group in celebrating its 40 years at the Teatro de Bellas Artes, marking his last concert with the group.

=== Death ===
Vega died on 9 May 2024, at the age of 93.

== Legacy ==
The government of the state of Veracruz created the "Andrés Vega Delfín" Medal, which recognizes the traditional musicians of the region and is awarded annually at the "Fiesta de La Candelaria" in Tlacotalpan, Veracruz.

== Discography ==
=== With Mono Blanco ===
- Sones Jarochos Volumen V - Grupo Mono Blanco - Ediciones Pentagrama CD, Álbum México (1997)
- El mundo se va a acabar - Grupo Mono Blanco y Stone Lips - CD (1997)
- Al Primer Canto Del Gallo - Grupo Mono Blanco Ediciones Pentagrama CD, Álbum, México (2004)
- Soneros Jarochos - Grupo Mono Blanco Arhoolie Records CD, Álbum US (2006)
- Matanga. Grupo Mono Blanco Y La Cofradía De San Antonio. CD (2009)

=== With the Vega family ===
- Familia Vega - Homenaje a Andrés Vega Delfín CD (2008)

=== Solo ===
- De la mera mata - Andrés Vega Delfín (2012)
- Laguna Prieta Vol.1 - Andrés Vega Delfín – Guitarra de Son (2015)

=== Compilations ===
- Encuentro De Jaraneros Vol. 1 - Mono Blanco (1994)
- Cuatro Maestros Los Cenzontles con Santiago Jiménez Jr.; Andrés Vega of Grupo Mono Blanco; Julián González; y Atilano López CD US (2001)
