= Ámbar Past =

US-born poet and visual artist (born 1949)

- Born: 1949 (age 76–77)
- Occupations: Poet, visual artist

Ámbar Past (born 1949) is a US-born poet and visual artist. She has been a Mexican citizen since 1972 and works out of San Cristóbal de las Casas, Chiapas where, in 1975, she founded Taller Leñateros.
