= Emmanuel Carballo =

Mexican writer (born 2 July 1929)

Manuel Carballo Chávez
- Born: 2 July 1929; Guadalajara, Jalisco, Mexico
- Died: 20 April 2014 (aged 84); Mexico City
- Education: National Autonomous University of Mexico
- Occupations: Writer; literary critic; editor; journalist
- Spouse: Beatriz Espejo
- Writing career
- Pen name: Emmanuel Carballo
- Notable awards: National Prize for Arts and Sciences (2006); Fine Arts Medal (2009)

Manuel Carballo Chávez (2 July 1929 – 20 April 2014), known as Emmanuel Carballo, was a Mexican writer, literary critic, editor and journalist. He is considered one of the leading Mexican literary critics of the 20th century. He was a critic for weekly newspapers and the editor of literary supplements and magazines, a teacher and lecturer, a book editor, and a radio and television commentator.

== Career ==
Carballo was born in Guadalajara, Jalisco, on 2 July 1929. His father was Avelino Carballo and his mother was María Gertrudis Chávez. At a young age, he wrote poems, fiction, and TV, theater and movies reviews. He studied law at the Universidad de Guadalajara, since it didn't offer a literature program, but abandoned it in the third year.

As a critic, Carballo was a promoter of prominent Mexican writers such as Carlos Fuentes, Carlos Monsiváis, Juan García Ponce, Sergio Pitol and Elena Poniatowska.

He published more than 149 works, including books of interviews, poetry, short stories, essays, research, memoirs, poems, glossary and short stories in anthologies.

He was a professor of literature at the Universidad de Guadalajara, at the School of Philosophy and Letters at the National Autonomous University of Mexico (UNAM) and at the creative writing school of the Sociedad General de Escritores de México. He was a member of the Sistema Nacional de Creadores de Arte.

In 1955 Carballo founded the Revista Mexicana de Literatura in colaboration with Carlos Fuentes.

Carballo hosted cultural programs on radio and television. He founded the Diógenes publishing house, the La Cultura en México supplement of the magazine Siempre!, and the Guadalajara-based magazines Ariel and Odiseo. He also edited or contributed to numerous cultural publications. He worked as a columnist in several newspapers and magazines, including Artes, Letras y Ciencias, Casa de las Américas, El Día, El Gallo Ilustrado, the Fondo de Cultura Económica's La Gaceta, México en la Cultura, Ovaciones, Punto, Revista de la Universidad de México, Sábado and Unomásuno. He was director of the José Martí Mexican-Cuban Institute of Cultural Relations. As a friend of Gabriel García Márquez, he was one of the copy editors of One Hundred Years of Solitude and kept one of the original manuscripts.

== Awards and honors ==
Carballo received the José María Vigil medal in 1956, the Jalisco Literature Prize in 1990 and the Arlequín Prize in 1999.

In 2005 he was awarded the Ramón López Velarde National Poetry Prize.

In 2006 Carballo was awarded the National Prize for Arts and Sciences in the linguistics and literature category. That same year he was awarded the Mazatlán Literature Prize (Spanish: Premio Mazatlán de Literatura) and the Fernando Benítez National Award for Cultural Journalism.

In 2008 Carballo was awarded the Alfonso Reyes Medal by the Universidad Autónoma de Nuevo León. In 2010 he received the Sinaloa Letters Prize (Spanish: Premio Letras de Sinaloa). In 2009 he was awarded the Fine Arts Medal.

In 2012 Carballo was bestowed membership in the Order of Isabella the Catholic.

== Personal life ==
Carballo married Laura Villaseñor in 1951. He met scholar and writer Beatriz Espejo at the School of Philosophy and Letters in the 1950s, when she was a student and he a teacher. They briefly dated while he was still married, but she ended the relationship after finding out about his status. After his divorce he married Espejo in 1973.

He died on 20 April 2014 in his home in Mexico City.
