= Angélica Delfina Vásquez Cruz =

Mexican potter (born 1958)

- Born: 20 September 1958 (age 67); Santa María Atzompa
- Other names: Ceramista del Preciosismo
- Occupation: Artist
- Parents: Ernesto Vásquez Reyes (father); Delfina Cruz Díaz (mother)

Angélica Delfina Vásquez Cruz, also known as the Ceramista del Preciosismo (born 20 September 1958), is a potter from Oaxaca, Mexico.

== Biography and career ==
Angélica Delfina Vásquez Cruz was born in Santa María Atzompa on 20 September 1958 to Delfina Cruz Díaz and Ernesto Vásquez Reyes, who taught their daughter artisan works and how to fashion toys, small jars, pots, and pans. In 1978, after learning how to decorate handicrafts, Vásquez began making her own crafts in her own style, inspired by the mythology, culture, and folklore of her home state, Oaxaca, in Mexico.

Vásquez has exhibited her works at the Mexican Fiesta at Millville, New Jersey in 2004, the Popular Art Museum of Oaxaca in San Bartolo Coyotepec in 2003, the National Museum of the American Indian in Washington D.C. in 1999, the Eyes Gallery of the Mexican Fine Arts Center in Philadelphia in 1998, the Chicago Museum's Celebrating Life exhibition in 1993, the annual Day of the Dead exhibitions in Oaxaca de Juárez, the International Ceramics Festival in Aberystwyth Arts Centre, Wales, and at the Museum of the Cats in California in 2008, among others.

Angélica Delfina Vásquez Cruz has been recognized as a master of Oaxaca folk art through her pottery which often includes angels and local animals. Her craft was taught to her by her father, who learned from his own father, and she has passed it down to her own daughter and granddaughter. She works with local materials, constructed traditionally and then wood fired upon completion. She makes each piece uniquely and by hand.

She received the 2008 National Prize for Arts and Sciences in the "Popular Arts and Traditions" category. The award was presented to her by Felipe Calderón.
