= Guillermo Bonfil Batalla =

Mexican anthropologist (1935–1991)

Guillermo Bonfil Batalla (July 29, 1935 – July 19, 1991) was a Mexican writer who was also trained as an ethnologist and anthropologist. He was director of the National Institute of Anthropology and History (INAH), General Director of Popular Cultures. He founded the National Museum of Popular Cultures. At the time of his death, he served as national coordinator of the Seminar for Cultural Studies of the National Council for Culture and the Arts (Conaculta).

For Bonfil Batalla, ethnological research was inextricably linked to the transformation of social reality. He was co-founder of the INAH Center for Higher Research, today the Center for Research and Higher Studies in Social Anthropology. In his honor the library of the National School of Anthropology and History bears his name.

== Education ==
He graduated from Mexico City's National School of Anthropology and History (Spanish: Escuela Nacional de Antropología e Historia, ENAH) in 1957. He received his doctorate from the National Autonomous University of Mexico (UNAM) in 1967 with the thesis "Modernization and traditionalism. Dialectics of Development in Cholula de Rivadavia".

== Professional career ==
He served as head of the Urban Social Welfare Center of the Secretariat of Health and Assistance (1957), published the journal Problems of Agriculture and Industry of Mexico, was co-editor of Problems of Mexico (1958–1959), carried out anthropology work at the National Institute of Nutrition (1960–1963), worked as an anthropologist in the Department of Anthropological Research of the INAH (1962–1968), and was interim head of the Sub-regional Office for Mexico, Central America and the Caribbean of the Latin American Center for Research in Social Sciences (1965–1966).

In the late 1970s, he was a visiting professor at the graduate program in Social Anthropology and the National Museum at the Federal University of Rio de Janeiro, Brazil. He held several chairs: head and director of several seminars at the ENAH (1962–1969) and technical advisor of the ethnology course (1967–1968); in those same years he was also a professor at the School of Anthropology and at the Graduate School of the Universidad Iberoamericana. He served in the Division of Higher Studies of the Faculty of Political and Social Sciences of the UNAM, and was advisor of Anthropology of the Division of Higher Studies of the Faculty of Philosophy and Letters of the UNAM (1971-1972). He also was professor at the ENAH with the Interethnic Relations course (1977–1978), of the Master's Course at the Latin American Faculty of Social Sciences (FLACSO) (1978)

He was director of the National Institute of Anthropology and History from 1972 to 1976 and of the INAH Center for Higher Research (1976–1980) and was the founder and director of the National Museum of Popular Cultures (Spanish: Museo Nacional de Culturas Populares) in Mexico City from 1982 to 1985. He was also the co-founder of the Center for Research and Higher Studies in Social Anthropology (Spanish: Centro de Investigación y Estudios Superiores en Antropología Social).

He was head of the Directorate of Popular Cultures of the federal Secretariat of Public Education (Spanish: Secretaría de Educación Pública or SEP). He was part of the Mexican Society of Anthropology and the Academy of Scientific Research, the Latin American Council of Social Sciences and the Mexican Council of Social Sciences. In 1980, he participated in the fourth Russell Tribunal on the Rights of the Indians of the Americas, held in Rotterdam. In 1986, he was bestowed the Palms of Academic Merit in France.

He carried out field research work related to problems of nutrition, housing, religious organization, trade, identity, interethnic relations and economic development in rural communities and indigenous areas in Cholula, Puebla, and in the Cuautla-Amecameca-Chalco region, among others.

In the last two years of his life, he worked as the coordinator of the Seminars on the Study of Culture (Spanish: Seminario de Estudios sobre Cultura), and assumed a position as the director of the Directorate General of Popular Cultures in the National Council for Culture and the Arts (Spanish: Consejo Nacional para la Cultura y las Artes). He died July 19, 1991, aged 55 in Coyoacán, Distrito Federal, Mexico.

== Contributions to Mexican cultural institutions ==
For Bonfil Batalla, ethnological research was inextricably linked to anthropology, specifically the ways social realities change. Bonfil Batalla worked with other intellectuals such as Rodolfo Stavenhagen, Lourdes Arizpe, Néstor García Canclini and Carlos Monsiváis, in an attempt to promote pluri-ethnic, pluricultural, and popular cultural politics in the federal government. His writing and political works often denounced Mexican discourse, politics, and national institutions that attempted to construct a homogeneous national and popular culture. Bonfil Batalla believed that the project of constructing a singular popular culture occurs at the expense of excluding indigenous cultures and other minority groups in Mexico. This exclusion and suppression of indigeneity in the country led Bonfil Batalla to observe that there were political mobilizations that called for increased democracy and cultural plurality. He called on national institutions to respond to this demand through the creation and renovation of the institutions themselves.

As an extension of the desire to recreate national cultural institutions, during his time as the director of the INAH Bonfil Batalla promoted the renovation of the museum system by encouraging direct participation with rural and urban communities. He continued this work through the development of the National Museum of Popular Cultures. Bonfil Batalla's efforts to create a museum as an anti-hegemonic space through ethnographic methods was based on his belief that museums were in a generalized crisis of cultural elitism. The museum space, according to Bonfil Batalla, produced and reinforced hegemonic power dynamics. Bonfil Batalla believed in the potential for the museum space to foster popular mobilizations and encourage different ways of conceptualizing political action.

== México Profundo: Reclaiming a Civilization ==
One of Bonfil Batalla's most notable works is México Profundo: Reclaiming a Civilization (Spanish: El México Profundo, una civilización negada). In this book, he explores the permanence and resilience of non-colonial cultures which colonialism sought to eradicate in Mexico as well as the concept and effects of detribalization, which he refers to as "de-Indianization." Bonfil Batalla demonstrates the existence of two different symbolic Mexicos resulting from colonial intrusions and hegemony.

The first México is deep Mexico (Spanish: México Profundo), defined by the persistence of Mesoamerican civilization that reveals itself to national society in a variety of ways and forms together with contemporary Indigenous communities. México Profundo has permanently existed despite mainstream and nationalistic efforts in Mexico to conceal and erase its presence. Through the denial of México Profundo by mainstream Mexican society, Mesoamerican civilization has been detached from the identity of Mexicans as "something apart from ourselves, something that happened long ago in the same place where we, the Mexicans, live today. The only connection is based on the fact of them and us occupying the same territory, but in different time periods."

México Profundo is formed by a great diversity of peoples, communities, and social sectors that constitute the majority of the population of the country. What unifies them and distinguishes them from the rest of Mexican society is that they are bearers of ways of understanding the world and of organizing human life that have their origins in Mesoamerican civilization and that have been forged here in Mexico through a long and complicated historical process. The contemporary expressions of that civilization are quite diverse: from those indigenous peoples who have been able to conserve an internally cohesive culture of their own, to a multitude of isolated traits distributed in different ways in urban populations. The civilization of Mesoamerica has been denied but it is essential to recognize its continuing presence.

The other Mexico is named the "Imaginary Mexico." It is referred to as "imaginary" because it does not actually exist, but rather has functioned as a national project of constructing a unified or "imagined" homogeneous Mexican identity. According to Bonfil Batalla, the mestizo is the embodiment of the Imaginary Mexico, as Indigenous cultures are experienced in his everyday life from the philosophical, to the ontological, and fundamentally the spiritual realms of his being yet he assumes a non-Indigenous identity. It draws inspiration from distant lands with dissimilar cultures distinct from any 'real' or 'profound' Mexican culture. The ultimate project of "Imaginary Mexico" is to uphold the dominant civilizational program geared towards Westernization.

Throughout the past 500 years of history, these two Mexicos have existed in a state of ongoing confrontation. At one pole are those that align with the "Imaginary Mexico" ideology and seek to direct the country to a Western civilization program. While, at the other pole, exist those who exhibit resistance tactics rooted in Mesoamerican ancestries, whether through silent resistance or open revolt. Bonfil Batalla asserted that this resistance can be attributed to the fact that "certain social groups have illegitimately held political, economic, and ideological power from the European invasion to the present." The illegitimate domination of these social groups emerged from "the stratified order of colonial society" and has expressed itself in the centuries since through upholding "an ideology that conceives of the future only in terms of development, progress, advancement, and the Revolution itself, all concepts within the mainstream of Western civilization."

As such, México Profundo and the "Imaginary Mexico" are not merely two different alternatives "within the framework of a common civilization," but rather are two entirely different paradigms "which are built on different ways of conceiving the world, nature, society, and humankind." Any attempt at "unification" of these two opposing frameworks has only been historically characterized by the pursuit to erase México Profundo and its inherent connections to Mesoamerican civilization while disseminating ideologies upholding the "Imaginary Mexico" and Westernization. This was historically carried about by various genocidal means, such as the complete obliteration of entire groups of Indigenous people as well as, "where the labor force of the Indians was required," their social and cultural segregation. This segregation meant that some Indigenous groups were able to retain continuity despite "the brutal decline in population during the first decades of the [Spanish] invasion."

For Bonfil Batalla, indigenous cultures have, in many ways, such an omnipresent and continuous presence in Mexico that rarely are they seen for their deep and complex meanings in the scheme of historical processes that made possible their presence in social sectors that assume a non-indigenous identity. This is the result of the symbolic process of constructing the Imaginary Mexico, that works to deny and conceal Indigeneity and permanently confront the reality of México Profundo. Bonfil Batalla believed that the role of indigenous peoples is so definitive in the ways it shapes Mexican culture, and will play an important role in shaping a new Mexican society.

In the 1996 English version of Bonfil Batalla's work, translator Philip A. Dennis cites the Zapatista National Liberation Army (EZLN) uprising in Chiapas as an event which brought México Profundo "into national consciousness," as Bonfil Batalla's conceptualization was "brought to life for millions of television viewers in Mexico and throughout the world."
