= Rafael Palacios de la Lama =

Mexican molecular biologist (born 1944)

- Born: 1944 (age 81–82); Mexico City, Mexico
- Education: National Autonomous University of Mexico
- Awards: National Prize for Arts and Sciences (1994)
- Scientific career
- Fields: Molecular biology Biochemistry
- Workplaces: National Autonomous University of Mexico
- Doctoral advisor: Guillermo Soberón Acevedo

Rafael Palacios de la Lama (born 1944) is a Mexican molecular biologist and academic known for his work on nitrogen fixation, bacterial genome dynamics, and Rhizobium genetics. He is an elected member of the National Academy of Sciences (United States) and the Mexican Academy of Sciences.

== Education and academic career ==
Palacios entered the National Autonomous University of Mexico (UNAM) Faculty of Medicine in 1962 and received his medical degree in 1969. He earned a Ph.D. in biochemistry from UNAM’s Faculty of Chemistry in 1970 under the supervision of Guillermo Soberón Acevedo. From 1970 to 1973 he completed postdoctoral research at Stanford University with Robert Schimke.

He joined the Institute of Biomedical Research at UNAM in 1969 and later became a researcher in the Department of Molecular Biology. He was involved in the establishment of graduate programs in basic biomedical research and contributed to the creation of UNAM’s undergraduate program in genomic sciences.

Palacios also contributed to the development of what became the Center for Genomic Sciences (Centro de Ciencias Genómicas), formerly the Center for Nitrogen Fixation Research.

== Research ==
Palacios’s early research focused on transcriptional regulation of glutamine synthetase, a key enzyme in nitrogen metabolism. His work included purification and characterization of the enzyme, analysis of its synthesis and degradation, and study of the messenger RNA encoding it.

He later conducted research on bacterial genome dynamics, particularly in Rhizobium species. He introduced the concept of the "amplicon" as a genetic element involved in bacterial genome architecture and dynamics, a term later incorporated into reference works in genetics.

== Honors and awards ==
- Scientific Research Award, Mexican Academy of Sciences (1979)
- Premio Universidad Nacional (1986)
- National Prize for Arts and Sciences (1994)
- TWAS Prize, The World Academy of Sciences (2003)
- Elected member of the U.S. National Academy of Sciences (2006)
- Elected member of the Mexican Academy of Sciences
