= Rubén Gerardo Barrera =

Mexican physicist

Rubén Gerardo Barrera y Pérez (born 3 February 1943) is a Mexican physicist, professor, and researcher. He is currently professor emeritus at the National Autonomous University of Mexico (UNAM). His area of specialty is condensed matter physics, and his main interest has been the optical properties of inhomogeneous systems. His recent work has focused on colloidal systems.

== Education and Teaching ==
Born in Mexico City, Barrera studied at UNAM in Mexico City, graduating in physics in 1965. In 1971, he obtained a PhD in physics at the University of Illinois Urbana-Champaign under the supervision of Professor Gordon Baym. He spent the next two years in Germany as a post-doctoral researcher at the University of Frankfurt (1972) and the Physikalisches Institut of the Rheinisch-Westfälische Technische Hochschule Aachen in Aachen (1973). He returned to UNAM in Mexico in 1973 as an Assistant Professor in the Institute of Physics, where he has remained since, being made full professor in 1984.

== Awards and honors ==
He was awarded the status of Fellow of the American Physical Society, nominated by their Forum on International Physics in 2001 for his significant contributions to the understanding of the optical properties of surfaces and inhomogenous media, as well as for his leadership in the establishment and improvement of relations among physicists in the Americas, and for helping to create the Latin American Federation of Physics Societies. In 2004 he became a Fellow of the Institute of Physics. In 2012 he was awarded the National Prize of the Sciences and the Arts in the area of Physical, Mathematical and Natural Sciences by the Government of Mexico.
