= Hugo Barrera Saldaña =

Mexican biologist

Hugo Alberto Barrera Saldaña (born 1957, in Ciudad Miguel Alemán, Tamaulipas) is a Mexican biologist, biochemist, researcher, entrepreneur, professor and academic, most noted for being author of several studies on molecular biology, epidemiology, and biomedicine, among which stand out his publications about the Growth Hormone family, human genome sequencing and development of HPV treatment and diagnostic methods.

In 1979, Barrera earned a Bachelor of Science degree in biology, along with the extracurricular subjects of chemistry, genetics and microbiology to become a biochemist from the Autonomous University of Nuevo León. He then became a doctoral student at the University of Texas at Houston, from which he graduated in 1982. In 1983, he did postdoctoral work at Louis Pasteur University with a specialty in Genetic Engineering. He also has a diploma in Conversion of Technology to Capital from the University of Texas and the Monterrey Institute of Technology and Higher Education, which he earned in 1999.

== Career and research ==
He has spent most of his career back in his alma mater, the Autonomous University of Nuevo León, and his research, mostly focused on Human Growth Factor and epidemiology, also extends from personalized medicine to circadian clock restriction. He is now professor and Director of National Research at the Monterrey Institute of Technology and Higher Education.

== Awards and honors ==
- Member of the Mexican Academy of Sciences since 1984
- José Rosenkranz Award for Medical Research in 1989
- Member of the Human Genome Organization since 1991
- University of Texas Distinguished Alumni Award in 1998
- José Rosenkranz Award for Medical Research in 2005
- GlaxoSmithKline Foundation National Research Award in 2005
- Luis Elizondo Award in 2016
- Mexico's National Science Award in 2019

== Notable publications ==
- Association of human papillomavirus 16 E6 variants with cervical carcinoma and precursor lesions in women from Southern Mexico. Virology Journal 12/2015; 12(1).
- MicroRNAs and their neuroimmunoregulator mechanisms in multiple sclerosis. Development of biomarkers for diagnosis. Revista de Neurología 06/2015; 60(12):562-71.
- Molecular evolution and expression profile of the chemerine encoding gene RARRES2 in baboon and chimpanzee. Biological research 06/2015; 48(1):31.
- Polymorphisms in GSTM1, GSTT1, GSTP1, and GSTM3 genes and breast cancer risk in northeastern Mexico. Genetics and molecular research: GMR 06/2015; 14(2):6465-6471.
- Molecular Cloning, Sequence Analysis, and Gene Expression of the Circadian Clock Gene Period in Culex quinquefasciatus Say (Diptera: Culicidae). Southwestern Entomologist 03/2015; 40(1):71-80.
- Molecular Cloning and Characterization of the Circadian Clock Timeless Gene in Culex quinquefasciatus Say (Diptera: Culicidae). Southwestern Entomologist 03/2015; 40(1):53-70.
- A Molecular Tool for Identification of Dipteran Species of Forensic Importance. Southwestern Entomologist 12/2014; 39(4):663-674.
- Extrapituitary growth hormone synthesis in humans. Growth hormone & IGF research: official journal of the Growth Hormone Research Society and the International IGF Research Society 04/2014; 24(2-3). DOI:10.1016/j.ghir.2014.01.005
- The Tumor Necrosis Factor α (-308 A/G) Polymorphism Is Associated with Cystic Fibrosis in Mexican Patients. PLoS ONE 03/2014; 9(3):e90945.
- Low-income status is an important risk factor in North East Mexican patients with cystic fibrosis. Source: PubMed 03/2014; 66(2):129-135.
- Landscape of genomic alterations in cervical carcinomas. Nature 12/2013; 506(7488).
- Comparative study of polymorphism frequencies of the CYP2D6, CYP3A5, CYP2C8 and IL-10 genes in Mexican and Spanish women with breast cancer. Pharmacogenomics 10/2013; 14(13):1583-1592
- Intraprostatic distribution and long term follow-up after AdV-tk immunotherapy as neoadjuvant to surgery in patients with prostate cancer. Cancer gene therapy 09/2013; 20(11).
- Genetic Structure of Mexican Mestizos with Type 2 Diabetes Mellitus based on Three STR Loci. Gene 05/2013; 525(1):41-46.
- Olfactomedin-like 3 (OLFML3) gene expression in baboon and human ocular tissues: cornea, lens, uvea, and retina. Journal of Medical Primatology 02/2013; 42(3).
- Individual response to drug therapy: Bases and study approaches. Revista de investigacion clinica; organo del Hospital de Enfermedades de la Nutricion 07/2012; 64(4):364-76
- DSCR9 gene simultaneous expression in placental, testicular and renal tissues from baboon (Papio hamadryas). BMC Research Notes 06/2012; 5:298.
- Association of single nucleotide polymorphisms of nicotinic acetylcholine receptor subunits with cervical neoplasia. Life sciences 03/2012; 91(21-22).
- The chimpanzee GH locus: composition, organization, and evolution. Mammalian Genome 01/2012; 23(5-6):387-98.
- Kinetics of BTEX biodegradation by a microbial consortium acclimatized to unleaded gasoline and bacterial strains isolated from it. International Biodeterioration & Biodegradation 10/2010; 64(7-64):581-587.
- High-throughput profiling of the humoral immune responses against thirteen human papillomavirus types by proteome microarrays. Virology 09/2010; 405(1):31-40.
- Applications of biotechnology and genomics in goats. Small Ruminant Research 04/2010; 89(s 2–3):81–90.
