= Xocchel Municipality =

Municipality in the Mexican state of Yucatán

Xocchel
- Municipality
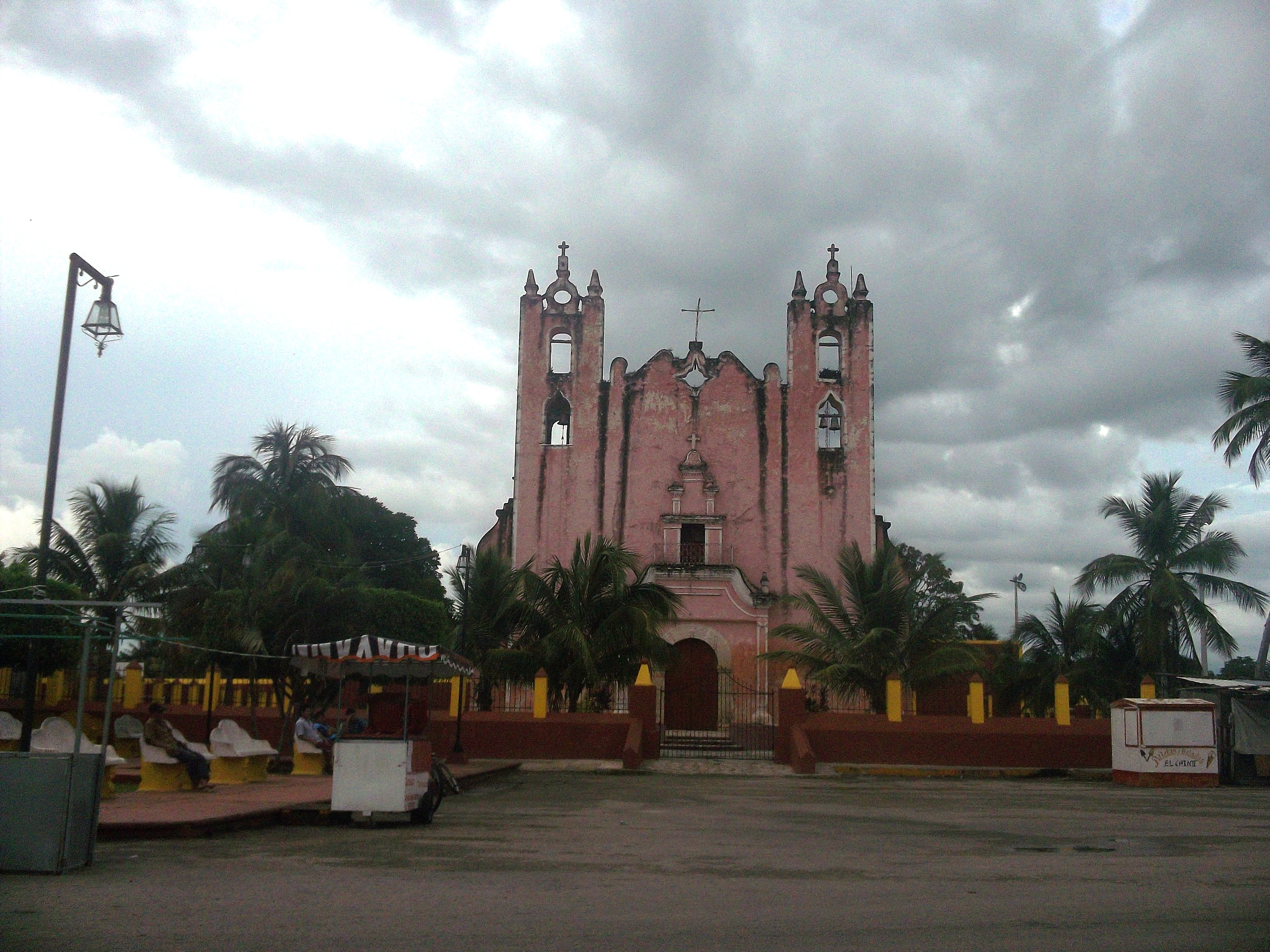
- Principal Church of Xocchel, Yucatán

- Region 3 Centro #103

- Location of the Municipality in Mexico
- Coordinates: 20°51′00″N 89°11′20″W
- Country: Mexico
- State: Yucatán

Government
  - Type: 2012–2015
  - Municipal President: Leydi Guadalupe Castro Gamboa

Area
  - Total: 53.65 km^{2} (20.71 sq mi)
- Elevation: 14 m (46 ft)

Population (2010)
  - Total: 3,236
- Time zone: UTC-6 (Central Standard Time)
- INEGI Code: 009
- Major Airport: Merida (Manuel Crescencio Rejón) International Airport
- IATA Code: MID
- ICAO Code: MMMD

Xocchel Municipality (pronounced [ʃokˈtʃʼel], in the Yucatec Maya Language: “counting jays”) is a municipality in the Mexican state of Yucatán containing 53.65 km^{2} of land and located roughly 45 km southeast of the city of Mérida.

== History ==
During pre-Hispanic times, the area was part of the chieftainship of Ah Kin Chel. After the conquest the area became part of the encomienda system. In 1753, two women were the encomenderas for Xocchel, Catalina Guerrero y Ulbarri and María Enríquez de Novoa, responsible for 207 indigenous people.

Yucatán declared its independence from the Spanish Crown in 1821. On 30 November 1840 a partition was made assigning Xocchel to the Izamal Municipality. In 1988, it was made its own municipality.

== Governance ==
The municipal president is elected for a three year term. The town council has four councilpersons, who serve as Secretary and councilors of public service, nomenclature, cemeteries, and parks.

== Communities ==
The head of the municipality is Xocchel, Yucatán. The other populated areas are Much, El Paraíso, Santa Cruz, X-lelbé, and Yaxquil. The significant populations are shown below:

| Community | Population |
|---|---|
| Entire Municipality (2010) | 3,236 |
| Xocchel | 2905 in 2005 |

== Local festivals ==
Every year from 24 to 29 June, the feast of San Juan Bautista, patron saint of the village, is held.

== Tourist attraction ==
- Church of San Juan Bautista
