= Leticia Myriam Torres Guerra =

Mexican chemist

- Born: September 9, 1955 (age 70); Monterrey, Mexico
- Education: Autonomous University of Nuevo León; University of Aberdeen
- Occupation: Chemist
- Awards: National Prize for Arts and Sciences (2018)

Leticia Myriam Torres Guerra (born September 9, 1955) is a Mexican chemist.

Her research work focuses on the development and synthesis of advanced materials such as semiconductors and their application as powders and films in renewable energy and sustainable decontamination projects.

In 2005, she was appointed head of the Faculty of Civil Engineering's Department of Ecomaterials and Energy at the Autonomous University of Nuevo León (UANL). As of 2019, she is the general director of the Advanced Materials Research Center.

== Biography ==
Leticia Myriam Torres Guerra was born in Monterrey on September 9, 1955. She graduated from UANL with a licentiate in industrial chemistry in 1976. She earned her doctorate in advanced ceramic materials at the University of Aberdeen in 1984. In 1985, she began her work as a research professor at UANL's Faculty of Chemical Sciences, and went on to receive the university's research award 15 times by 2010. She became a Level 3 member of the Sistema Nacional de Investigadores in 1986, the only woman to do so for ten years.

Other positions she has held are deputy director of research of the UANL Faculty of Chemical Sciences from 1995 to 2001, and deputy director of scientific and technological development of the National Council of Science and Technology (CONACYT) from 2011 to 2013. She was a certified leader in renewable energies and energy efficiency at Harvard University during 2014 and 2015. She has been a member of the Mexican Academy of Sciences since 1999, the Mexican Materials Society since 2009, and the International Union of Materials Research Societies since 2017. She is on four committees of Mexico's Presidential Advisory Council of Sciences.

Torres founded the Center for Research and Development of Ceramic Materials (active from 1990 to 1995) at UANL's Faculty of Chemical Sciences. She has carried out technological developments in collaboration with the industrial sector, including an agreement with the Vitro Group in 1996 to teach a master of science program with a specialty oriented to glass, and one with Cemex to implement a special UNI-EMPRESA scholarship program.

In 2019, she was named general director of the Advanced Materials Research Center.

== Research ==
Torres' work has focused on materials science; she began her research with the synthesis of advanced ceramic materials and crystal chemistry. Her most notable scientific investigations have focused on the synthesis and modification of semiconductors such as titanates, tantalates, and zirconates of alkali and alkaline earth metals for decontamination of air, soil, and water through photocatalysis, as well as their use in hydrogen production. The materials developed in her work group have shown high photoelectrocatalytic efficiency, allowing the development of prototypes of an "artificial leaf" to transform solar energy into chemical energy.

== Awards and recognition ==
- 2012: "Flama, Vida y Mujer" award from the Autonomous University of Nuevo León
- 2015: "Master of Business Leadership" and "Master of Business Management" distinctions from the World Confederation of Businesses in Houston, Texas
- 2015: Medal of Civic Merit from the State of Nuevo León for her successful performance in the area of scientific research
- 2018: National Prize for Arts and Sciences in the field of Technology, Innovation, and Development
- 2019: Valor Regiomontano Award from the Universidad Regiomontana

== Selected publications ==
- Diagramas de Equilibrio de Fases. 2012. Patricia Quintana Owen, Leticia M. Torres-Martínez.
- Fotosíntesis Artificial: Estudio de fundamentación social, económica, científica y tecnológica de la Fotosíntesis Artificial para la reducción de CO_{2} ambiental y la producción de energéticos sustentables en México. 2013. Alfredo Aguilar, Diego M.M. de la Escalera, Gisela Aguirre, Jessica Rangel, Jorge A. Ascencio, Leticia Torres, Edilso Reguera, Ricardo Gómez, Lorenzo Martínez.
