= Escuela de Periodismo Carlos Septién García =

Coordinates: 19°26′13″N 99°08′55″W

Carlos Septién García School of Journalism
- Escuela de Periodismo Carlos Septién García
- Established: May 30, 1949
- Director: Analletzin Díaz Alcalá
- Location: Cuauhtémoc Borough, Mexico City, Mexico
- Website: www.septien.edu.mx/epcsg

The Escuela de Periodismo Carlos Septién García (EPCSG - Carlos Septién García School of Journalism) is a Mexican educational institution of journalism. It was founded by Luis Beltrán y Mendoza, and supported by the Acción Católica Mexicana (Mexican Catholic Action), on May 30, 1939, and achieved certification of the Secretaría de Educación Pública on July 2, 1976. The school was named after its second director. This school was the first in Mexico to be dedicated specifically to journalism.

Under the leadership of Alejandro Avilés Insunza the school detached itself from the Acción Católica Mexicana and its associated political and ideological tendencies concerning academic freedom.

== Principals ==
1. 1949-1951: Fernando Díez de Urdanivia y Díaz (1897–1966)
2. 1951-1953: Carlos Septién García (1915–1953)
3. 1953-1958: José N. Chávez González
4. 1958-1963: Carlos Alvear Acevedo
5. 1963-1984: Alejandro Avilés Insunza (1915–2005)
6. 1984-2001: Manuel Pérez Miranda
7. 2001-2004: Alejandro Hernández
8. 2004-2008: Manuel Pérez Miranda (second time)
9. 2009-2016:-José Luis Vázquez Baeza
10. 2016-2022: Víctor Hugo Villalva
11. 2022-present: Analletzin Díaz Alcalá
