= ESIQIE =

Higher Education School of Chemical Engineering and Extractive Industries
- Escuela Superior de Ingeniería Química e Industrias Extractivas
- Other names: ESIQIE
- Type: Public
- Established: 1948
- Academic affiliations: ANFEI
- Dean: Ing. José Clemente Reza García
- Director: Dra. Guadalupe Silva Oliver
- Academic staff: Chemistry
- Location: Mexico City, Mexico; 19°30′05″N 99°08′04″W
- Website: www.esiqie.ipn.mx

The Higher Education School of Chemical Engineering and Extractive Industries (in Spanish: Escuela Superior de Ingeniería Química e Industrias Extractivas or ESIQIE) was founded as part of the National Polytechnic Institute in 1948. It offers undergraduate studies in:

== Undergraduate ==
- Industrial Chemical Engineering
- Petrochemical Engineering
- Metallurgical and Materials Engineering

with two different curricula:

- Materials Engineering
- Materials and Processing

Undergraduate studies in Petrochemical Engineering were first offered by the Institute in 1941 under the now defunct Superior School of Engineering and Architecture. Undergraduate studies in Chemical Engineering were first offered in 1945 under the direction of Dean Guillermo Torres Prieto.

== Postgraduate ==
It offers postgraduate studies that are part of the National Register of Postgraduate Studies of the National Council of Science and Technology of Mexico, (CONACYT):

- Master in Science in Chemical Engineering.
- Master in Science in Metallurgical Engineering.
- Master in Engineering in Hydrocarbon and its Associated Energetics.
- Doctorate in Science in Chemical Engineering.
- Doctorate in Science in Metallurgy and Materials.
- Doctorate in Nanoscience and Micro-Nanotechnology.

== Sports ==
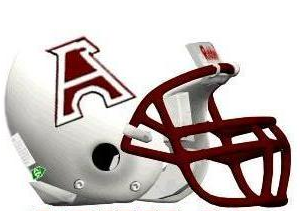
Águilas Blancas de la ESCA-ESIQIE football helmet

ESIQIE is well known for being represented by Águilas Blancas in college football. They are by far the most successful team within the Polytechnic, and one of the most prolific in entire country, having won 5 national championships since their inception.

== Alumni ==
- José Roberto "Pepe" Espinosa, sports broadcaster for TV Azteca and Fox Sports Latin America.
