= Roberto Cabral del Hoyo =

Mexican historian and writer (1913–1999)

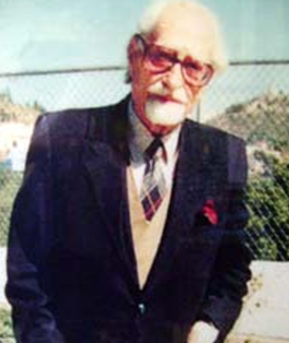
- Roberto Cabral del Hoyo
- Born: August 7, 1913; Zacatecas, Mexico
- Died: October 4, 1999 (aged 86)

Roberto Cabral del Hoyo (August 7, 1913 – October 4, 1999) was a Mexican historian and writer.

== Biography ==
His father was Don Fernando Cabral Velasco, who worked in Hermosillo, Sonora, as manager of the Banco Nacional de Mexico. His mother, Amalia Rouset Pit, belonged to a family of former miners and ranchers. Cabral del Hoyo was born in the city of Zacatecas.

In June 1930, Cabral del Hoyo participated in a speech contest organized by El Universal. He did well in the qualifying state and had the opportunity to attend the national qualifiers, held in Mexico City. Although he lost, he met several people that were interested in literature like him and gained something more important: a passion for literature revives.

Without a father, he took refuge in poetry. Cabral del Hoyo was also introduced into the world of letters.

In his late teens he attended La Peña Literaria, which was formed in 1931 to celebrate the centenary of Sciences Institute (now University). There, he learned to critically evaluate his own texts and those of Ramón López Velarde. In the same year, Don Roberto suspended his studies and began to work in the State Treasury. He was financially responsible for Marie Louise and her sisters Amalia. Subsequently, he returned to administer the estate, which he could never do.

== Literary life ==
Cabral del Hoyo began to write poetry and published his first compositions in 1941. After being published, he became very successful and wrote several books of his own.

While in Mexico from 1938 to 1948, he would write, direct and produce radio programs for XEW, XEQ and Radio Mil. In 1948, he published his second book of your love and your Lost and Other Poems.

From 1948 to 1949, he was deputy director of Radio Education, SEP, and in 1950 the Editorial STYLO, he published his third book.

Cabral del Hoyo masterfully handled sonnets, was smart and sensitive, and made the meter and rhythm combine in poems imbued with intense feeling. His extraordinary literary excellence belonged to the Group of Eight, along with major poets like Alejandro Avila, Efren Hernandez, Dolores Castro and Rosario Castilian. His poetry runs between the different human feelings but also pays tribute to Zacatecas in many of his works.

== Career as a public servant ==
His career in public service included serving as director of federal government tourist services, and deputy director of Radio Education, where he never dropped his commitment to children and youth in Mexico.

Cabral del Hoyo was recognized by the State Congress in 1993 and had a street named in his honor in the Díaz Ordaz neighborhood. He was also named a distinguished citizen by the capital city council.

Cabral del Hoyo returned to Zacatecas to spend his last days, always attentive to the institution that bears his name, being in contact with teachers, principals and students.

== Works ==
- In 1959, he published his book Against the Dark Wind with the JUS Editorial.
- In 1962, the JUS Editorial published his book Three of his words.
- In 1964, Editorial Castalia published his book Word.
- In 1966, the Editorial Ecuador O. O. O., he published his book Filly Pearl.
- In 1968, in the Journal of Popular Culture, he published his book To My Roots of the Earth.
- In 1970, the Fondo de Cultura Económica published it in the Arena Trail.
- In 1971, the Government of the State of Zacatecas, he published June 19.
- In 1980, the Fondo de Cultura Económica published his poetry.
- In 1985, Roberto poetic reflections were published in San Angelo.
- In 2001, musicians David Soraiz and Edmundo Llamas published "Si usted supiera Don Roberto," an audio CD containing songs with lyrics by Roberto Cabral del Hoyo and music by Soraiz and Llamas.

== Death ==
Robert Cabral del Hoyo died of pneumonia on October 4, 1999. His remains were moved to his hometown of Zacatecas, where they were received by the state governor, Ricardo Monreal Avila.

Cabral del Hoyo was paid tribute, first in the central courtyard of the Palacio de Gobierno and later in the LVI Legislature of the state. His body was cremated and his ashes were deposited later by his children, Robert, Marie Louise and Laura. In the library Pit Roberto Cabral leaves his vast legacy. Some of the highlights include, Of Poetry (1941), Of your love and your oblivion and Other Poems (1948), On merit grace (1950), Romance of Zacatecas (1952), Against the Dark Wind (1959), Pearl Filly (1966), Incomplete Poetry (1971) and Poetic Works (1980).
