= Néstor García Canclini =

Argentinian anthropologist

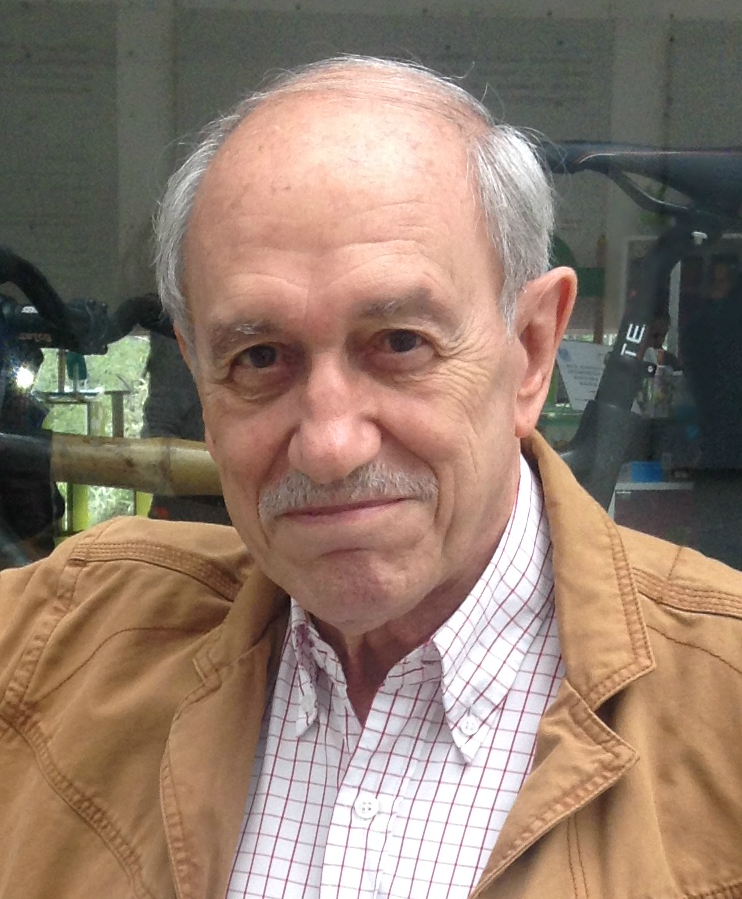
Néstor García Canclini

Néstor García Canclini (born 1939) is an Argentinian academic and anthropologist known for his theorization of the concept of "hybridity."

== Biography ==
García Canclini was born December 1, 1939, in La Plata, Argentina. Three years after receiving his PhD in philosophy at the University of La Plata in 1975, thanks to a scholarship awarded from CONICET (The National Scientific and Technical Research Council), García Canclini also received another PhD in philosophy from the Paris Nanterre University. He taught at the University of La Plata between 1966 and 1975 and at the University of Buenos Aires in 1974 and 1975. Throughout his academic career he has also served as a visiting professor at University of Naples, UT Austin, Stanford University, University of Barcelona and São Paulo. Since 1990 García Canclini has been working as a professor and researcher at the Universidad Autónoma Metropolitana in Mexico City and until 2007 he directed the university's program studies on urban culture. He is also a researcher emeritus of the National System of Investigators under the National Council of Science and Technology (Conacyt) of Mexico.

== Lines of Investigation ==
In the text Comunicación y consumo en tiempos neoconservadores (Communication and Consumerism in Neoconservative Times), the theorist affirms that communications research, centered in the social sciences, has made areas of Latin American cultural development visible, in which the relationship between consumerism and citizenship is established. Consumerism, a product of globalization, has generated a new conception of the citizen, while the quantity of goods that a person can acquire determines the social status that they have and therefore the role of the common citizen, in terms of political participation (mainly) depends on how the consumer is.

The principal cause of the aforementioned phenomenon is globalization. For Canclini, this concept does not have its own definition, rather, it depends on the circumstances and the contexts which are presented. In the Latin American case, globalization is not a perceptible fact, instead an imagined concept, that is to say, it constitutes a paradigm in Latin American society that governs the relations between different individuals (there is a notion that it "exists," but in reality it is the product of a series of values that Latin American society has imposed upon itself to resemble the first world).

The previous can be seen reflected in the critique of marketing studies that only counts the economic figures of Latin America's entry into world trade, but do not take into account the symbolic-social change that this generates, in his book La globalización imaginada (The Imagined Globalization), chapter 'Mercado e Interculturalidad: América Latina entre Europa y Estados Unidos' (Market and Interculturality: Latin America between Europe and the United States). In respect to the last main idea of the investigation, Canclini suggests that the Latin American cultural space and transitional circuits are immersed in imagined constructions about the identity of us and of others; the Latin American elite constructs the city in resemblance to the great European and American metropolises, while the rest of the town seeks to survive with its traditions in the modernizing process.

"La industria cultural es analizada como matriz de desorganización y reorganización de una experiencia temporal mucho más compatible con las desterritorializaciones y relocalizaciones que implican las migraciones sociales y las fragmentaciones culturales de la vida urbana que la que configuran la cultura de élite o la cultura popular, ambas ligadas a una temporalidad "moderna"; esto es, una experiencia hecha de sedimentaciones, acumulaciones e innovaciones. Industria cultural y comunicaciones masivas designan los nuevos procesos de producción y circulación de la cultura, que corresponden no sólo a innovaciones tecnológicas sino a nuevas formas de la sensibilidad, a nuevos tipos de recepción, de disfrute y apropiación."

English Translation:

The cultural industry is analyzed like a matrix of disorganization and reorganization of a temporary experience much more compatible with the deterritorializations and relocations that imply social migrations and cultural fragmentations of urban life that configure the elite culture and popular culture, both bound to a temporary "modernity," this is, an experience made of sedimentations, accumulations and innovations. Cultural industry and massive communications design new processes of production and circulation of culture, that correspond not only to technological innovations but also new forms of sensibility, new forms of reception, of enjoyment and appropriation.

In the book Lectores, espectadores e internautas (Readers, Spectators, and Internet Users), Canclini asks us: What does it mean to be a reader, spectator, and internet user? What are the cultural habits of a person that concurs in these three activities? Canclini speaks of the reader in two sentiments, the first making reference to the literary field like Hans Robert Jauss and the second through the editorial system like Umberto Eco does. Canclini accuses the system of wanting to generate new readers only through printed media, without taking into account digital media. The concept of the spectator is linked to the types of shows that they attend, cinema, television, recitals etc. And the internet-user is "un actor multimodal que lee, ve, escucha y combina materiales diversos, procedentes de la lectura y de los espectáculos" (a multimodal actor that reads, sees, listens, and combines diverse materials, from readings and entertainment).

The book develops in the form of a dictionary, starting with A for 'apertura' (aperture) and the Z for zipping. He describes new concepts that have brought the digital age. The reader - spectator - and internet user read more on the internet than on paper. This book shows us both the benefits of technology and its negative aspects that are familiar to us all.

== Works ==
=== Overview ===
Canclini has been one of the principal anthropologists that has treated Modernity, Postmodernity, and Culture from the Latin American perspective. One of the principal terms he has coined is "cultural hybridization," a phenomenon that "materializes in multi-determined scenarios where diverse systems intersect and interpenetrate." An example of this is contemporary music groups that mix or juxtapose global trends such as pop with indigenous or traditional rhythms. One of his best-known works, Consumidores y ciudadanos (Consumers and Citizens) defines consumption as "the set of socio-cultural processes in which the appropriation and uses of products are carried out."

=== Hybrid Cultures: Strategies for Entering and Leaving Modernity ===
This text is foundational to Latin American Cultural Studies and is now considered a classic. Canclini takes an interdisciplinary approach to social thought to critically reimagine Latin American issues pertaining to modernity and democracy,

"Néstor García Canclini explores the tensions, verging on contradictions, between modernization and democratization in Latin American nation-states. These states regard themselves caught between traditions that have not yet gone and a modernity that has not yet arrived. From its hybrid position between tradition and modernity, the challenge for Latin America is to construct democratic culture and knowledge without succumbing either to the temptations of elite art and literature or to the coercive forces of mass media and marketing. In a work of committed scholarship the author both interrogates and advocates the development of democratic institutions and practices in Latin America."

Canclini analyzes and synthesizes the theories of Bourdieu, Gramsci, Weber, elite literary works and popular culture to envision a Latin American praxis that celebrates hybridization "as an ongoing condition of all human cultures, which contains no zones of purity because they undergo continuous processes of transculturation (two-way borrowing and lending between cultures)." Thereby imagined cultural borders are actually very porous.

=== List of works ===
- Arte popular y sociedad en América Latina, Grijalbo, México, (1977)
- La producción simbólica. Teoría y método en sociología del arte, Siglo XXI, México, (1979)
- Las culturas populares en el capitalismo, Nueva Imagen, México, (1982)
- ¿De qué estamos hablando cuando hablamos de lo popular?, CLAEH, Montevideo, 1986
- Cultura transnacional y culturas populares (ed. con R. Roncagliolo), Ipal, Lima, 1988
- Culturas híbridas: Estrategias para entrar y salir de la modernidad, Grijalbo, México, 1990
- Cultura y Comunicación: entre lo global y lo local, Ediciones de Periodismo y Comunicación.
- Las industrias culturales y el desarrollo de México, con Ernesto Piedras Feria 2008, México, DF, Siglo XXI Editores.
- Las industrias culturales en la integración latinoamericana, 2002
- La globalización imaginada, Paidós, Barcelona, 1999
- Latinoamericanos buscando lugar en este siglo, Paidós, Buenos Aires, 2002
- Diferentes, desiguales y desconectados. Mapas de la interculturalidad, Gedisa, Barcelona, 2004
- Lectores, espectadores e internautas, Gedisa, Barcelona, 2007
- La sociedad sin relato: Antropología y estética de la inminencia, Buenos Aires y Madrid, Katz editores, 2010, ISBN 978-84-92946-15-0

==== English-translated Versions ====
- Transforming Modernity: Popular Culture in Mexico, University of Texas Press, 1993
- Hybrid Cultures: Strategies for Entering and Leaving Modernity, University of Minnesota Press, 1995
- Consumers and Citizens: Globalization and Multicultural Conflicts, University of Minnesota Press, 2001
- Art beyond Itself: Anthropology for a Society without a Story Line, Duke University Press, 2014
- Imagined Globalization, Duke University Press, 2014

== Awards/Accolades ==
In 1996 Canclini received a Diploma of Merit from the Konex Foundation in the category of «Aesthetic, Theory and Art History». He also received the Guggenheim Scholarship, the Essay Award granted by Casa de las Américas and the Book Award from the Latin American Studies Association for his book Hybrid Cultures as the best book in Spanish about Latin America.

In 2012 Canclini received from National University of Cordoba the University Prize for Culture "400 years" during the opening of the Third International Congress of the Argentine Association of Cinema and Audiovisual Studies of which he was inaugural speaker. In 2014 the Ministry of Public Education awarded him the National Prize for Science and Arts in the area of History, Social Sciences and Philosophy. In 2017 at the close of the VIII National and Latin American V: The University as an Object of Study "The University Reform between two centuries," Canclini received the 33rd Honoris Causa of the National University of the Coast.

== Bibliography ==
García Canclini, Néstor (1995). Consumidores y ciudadanos: Conflictos multiculturales de la globalización. México: Grijalbo.

Rosaldo, R. (1995). Foreword. In CANCLINI N., Chiappari C., & López S. (Authors), Hybrid Cultures: Strategies for Entering and Leaving Modernity (pp. Xi-Xviii). University of Minnesota Press.
