= Rodolfo Stavenhagen =

German–Mexican sociologist and anthropologist

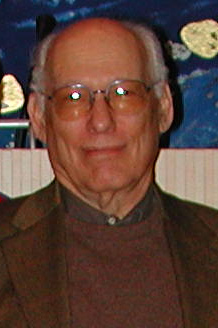
Rodolfo Stavenhagen

Rodolfo Stavenhagen (29 August 1932 – 5 November 2016) was a German-born Mexican sociologist and anthropologist who specialized in the study of human rights and the political relations between indigenous peoples and states. He was a professor-researcher at El Colegio de México. In 2001 he was appointed by the United Nations Commission on Human Rights the first United Nations Special Rapporteur on the situation of the human rights and fundamental freedoms of indigenous people through Resolution 2001/57. His mandate expired 30 April 2008. He was succeeded by Prof S. James Anaya of the University of Arizona.

He was born in 1932 in Frankfurt to a Jewish family, and because of Nazi persecution his family fled to Mexico in 1940. He studied at the University of Chicago and later at Mexico's Escuela Nacional de Antropología e Historia, before receiving his PhD from the University of Paris.

He taught as a visiting professor at Harvard and Stanford and the UNAM. The International Institute of Social Studies (ISS) awarded its Honorary Fellowship to Rodolfo Stavenhagen in 1982.

== Selected publications in English ==
- Stavenhagen, Rodolfo. "Indigenous peoples and the state in Latin America: An ongoing debate." In Multiculturalism in Latin America, pp. 24–44. Palgrave Macmillan UK, 2002. Harvard
- Stavenhagen, R. (1996). Indigenous rights: some conceptual problems. Constructing democracy: Human rights, citizenship, and society in Latin America, 141-159.
- Stavenhagen, R. (2003). Report of the Special Rapporteur on the situation of human rights and fundamental freedoms of indigenous people. Engaging the UN special rapporteur on indigenous people: Opportunities and challenges. Baguio City, Philippines: TEBTEBBA Foundation.
- Stavenhagen, Rodolfo. "Challenging the nation-state in Latin America." Journal of International Affairs (1992): 421-440.
- Stavenhagen, Rodolfo. "Social aspects of agrarian structure in Mexico." Social Research (1966): 463-485.
- Stavenhagen, Rodolfo. "Capitalism and the Peasantry in Mexico." Latin American Perspectives 5, no. 3 (1978): 27-37.
- Charters, Claire, and Rodolfo Stavenhagen. Making the declaration work: The United Nations declaration on the rights of indigenous peoples. Copenhagen: IWGIA, 2009.
- Stavenhagen, R. (2008). Building intercultural citizenship through education: a human rights approach. European Journal of Education, 43(2), 161-179.

== Selected prizes and awards ==
- 2003 Martin Diskin Prize of the Latin American Studies Association
- 1997 Nacional Prize of Arts and Sciences of the Mexican Government
