= Gilberto Owen =

Mexican poet and diplomat (1904-1952)

Gilberto Owen Estrada
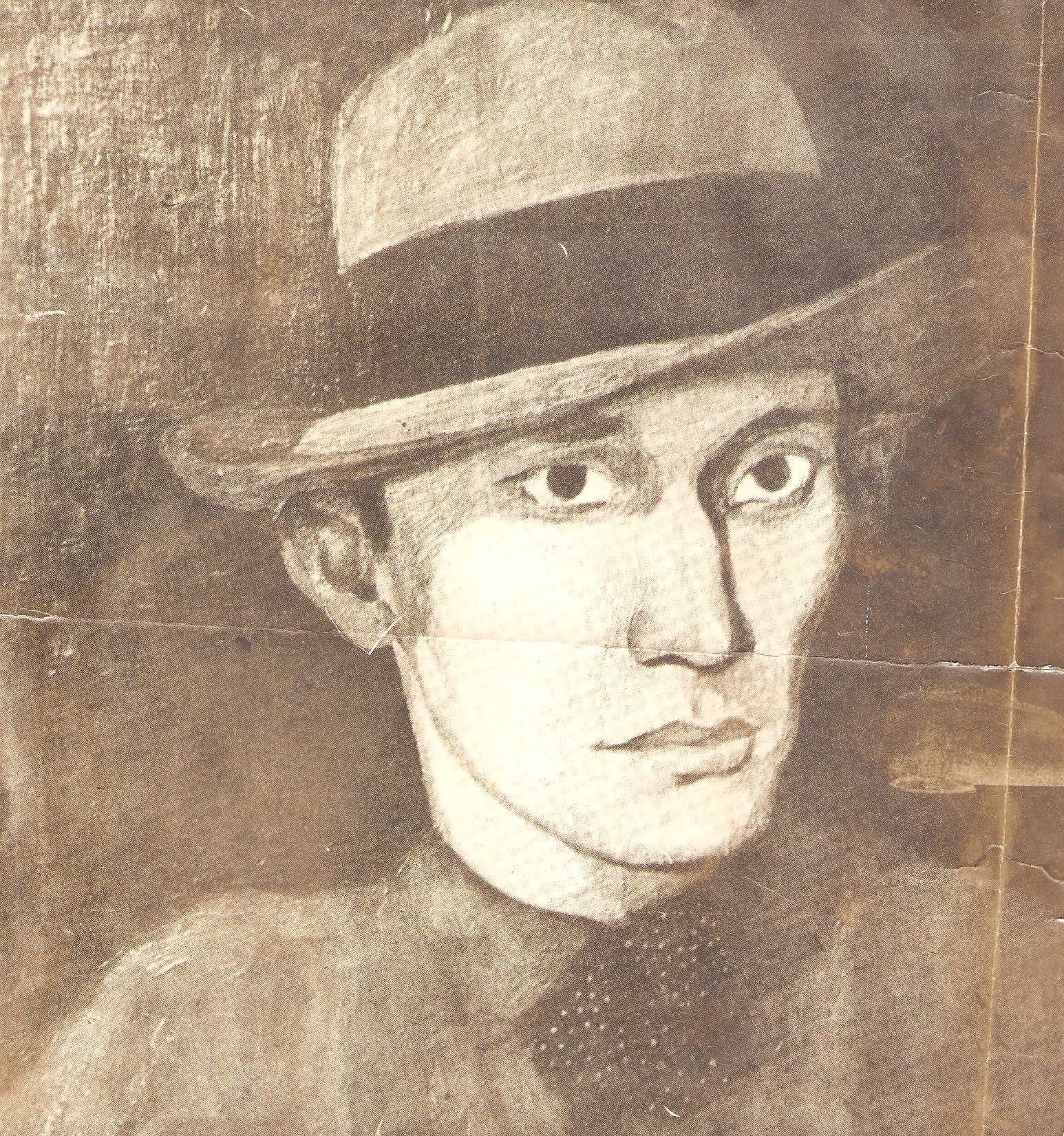
- Born: May 13, 1904; Rosario, Sinaloa, Mexico
- Died: March 9, 1952 (aged 47); Philadelphia, Pennsylvania, U.S.
- Resting place: Holy Cross Cemetery, Yeadon, Pennsylvania, U.S.
- Spouse: Cecilia Salazar Roldán
- Children: 2
- Writing career
- Genre: poems

Gilberto Owen Estrada (May 13, 1904 – March 9, 1952) was a Mexican poet and diplomat.

== Biography ==
Officially registered as Gilberto Estrada, son of Margarita Estrada from Michoacán, Gilberto Owen was born in Rosario, Sinaloa (May 13, 1904). He spent some of his early years (1919–1923) in Toluca, where he studied at the Instituto Científico y Literario. In 1923, he left Toluca and went to Mexico City, after he got contact to General Álvaro Obregón, who engaged him in the Secretaría de la Presidencia, where he served from August 1923 to June 1928. He matriculated in the Escuela Nacional Preparatoria. At this time he met the actress Clementina Otero, and people like Bernardo Ortiz de Montellano, Salvador Novo, Xavier Villaurrutia, Jorge Cuesta, Carlos Pellicer, Jaime Torres Bodet, José Gorostiza, Enrique González Rojo and others, when he joined the group Los Contemporáneos, where he also wrote for the magazine "Ulises" in 1926. He is presumed to be the romantic one and the least civilized of the group.

He spent some years in Bogota where he worked as a journalist and newspaper translator. A compilation of his work in Bogota, Colombia, has been published. Editors Celene García Ávila and Antonio Cajero rescued from El Tiempo (1933–1935) articles and chronicles that display a variety of styles and deal with topics such as politics, extraordinary facts and lifestyle in Latin America. This book was published by Miguel Angel Porrua and Autonomous University of the State of Mexico (UAEM) in 2009.

In July 1928 he became diplomat of the Secretaría de Relaciones Exteriores, and so he lived and wrote the longest time of his life abroad, first in the United States, later in Peru, Ecuador, and at the end of 1932 in Colombia, where he married Cecilia Salazar Roldán on December 2, 1935, daughter of the Colombian General and governor of Panama Víctor Manuel Salazar. In Bogotá he published sporadically in the newspaper "El Tiempo". After his marriage failed, he returned to Mexico in 1942, where he wrote for the magazine "El hijo pródigo". In the end of the 1940s he had serious health problems, when he was transferred to the Consulate of Mexico in Philadelphia, where he finally served as vice-consul.

Owen died in Philadelphia from cirrhosis due to alcoholism. His family could not arrange for his body to be returned to Mexico and he was interred at Holy Cross Cemetery in Yeadon, Pennsylvania in an unmarked grave.

A literature prize is awarded in his name. Owen is also a central character in the novel Faces in the Crowd (2011) by Valeria Luiselli.

== Works ==
- La llama fría (short-novel), 1925
- Desvelo, 1925
- Novela como nube (prose), 1928
- Línea, 1930
- Libro de Ruth, 1944
- Perseo vencido, 1948
- Simbad el varado, 1948
- Poesía y prosa, 1953
- Primeros versos, 1957
- El infierno perdido, 1978
- Obras, 1979
