= Teatro Ulises =

Experimental theater located in the cale de Mesones 42, Mexico City

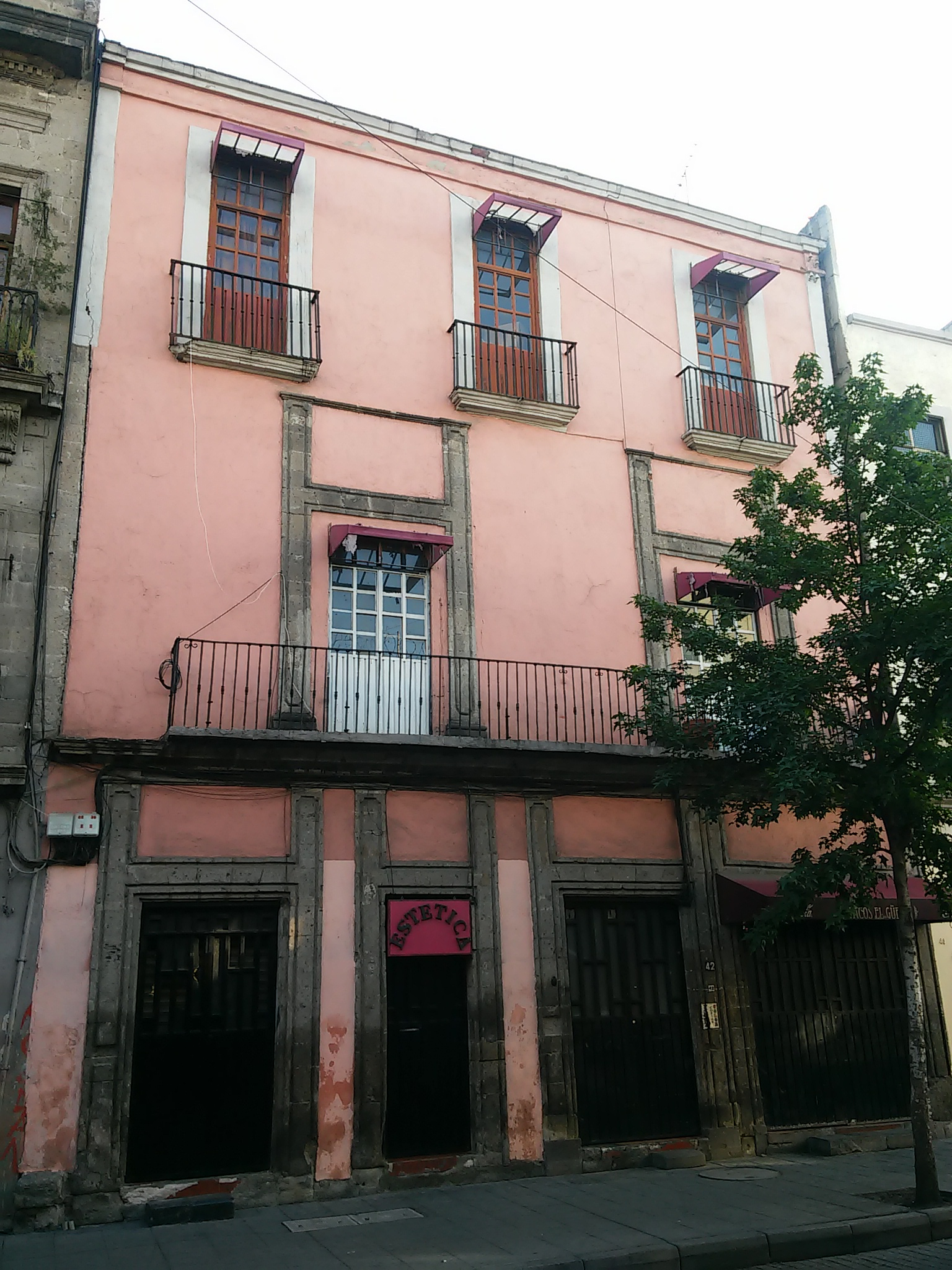
The building where the old Ulises theater was located at 42 Mesones street, Mexico City, Mexico

The Teatro Ulises (literally Odysseus theater) was an experimental theater, located in the calle de Mesones 42 of Mexico City.

== History ==
It was established around 1927/1928 by Antonieta Rivas Mercado, daughter of the architect Antonio Rivas Mercado, and further members of the group Los Contemporáneos. The small theater with about 50 seats only existed for a few months until 1929, but influenced modern Mexican theater fundamentally.

The theater was predominantly created and financed by Antonieta Rivas Mercado and María Luisa "Malú" Cabrera, later Maria Luisa Block, daughter of the writer and politician Luis Cabrera Lobato.

The scenarios were based mainly on translations of scripts of notable international writers, like Jean Cocteau, Eugene O'Neill, Lord Dunsany, Claude Roger-Marx, Luigi Pirandello, Jean Giraudoux, Henrik Ibsen, August Strindberg, Charles Vildrac, Henri-René Lenormand and others.

Notable members of the Teatro Ulises were Salvador Novo, Xavier Villaurrutia, Gilberto Owen, Julio Jiménez Rueda, Roberto Montenegro, Manuel Rodríguez Lozano, Julio Castellanos, Bernardo Ortiz de Montellano, Isabela Corona, Clementina Otero and Celestino Gorostiza. The building of the former theater gave way to a shopping center.

In 1932 the Teatro Orientación was founded by members of the Teatro Ulises, that followed a similar line, and existed until 1938.
