= Jaime Torres Bodet =

Mexican politician and writer (1902–1974)

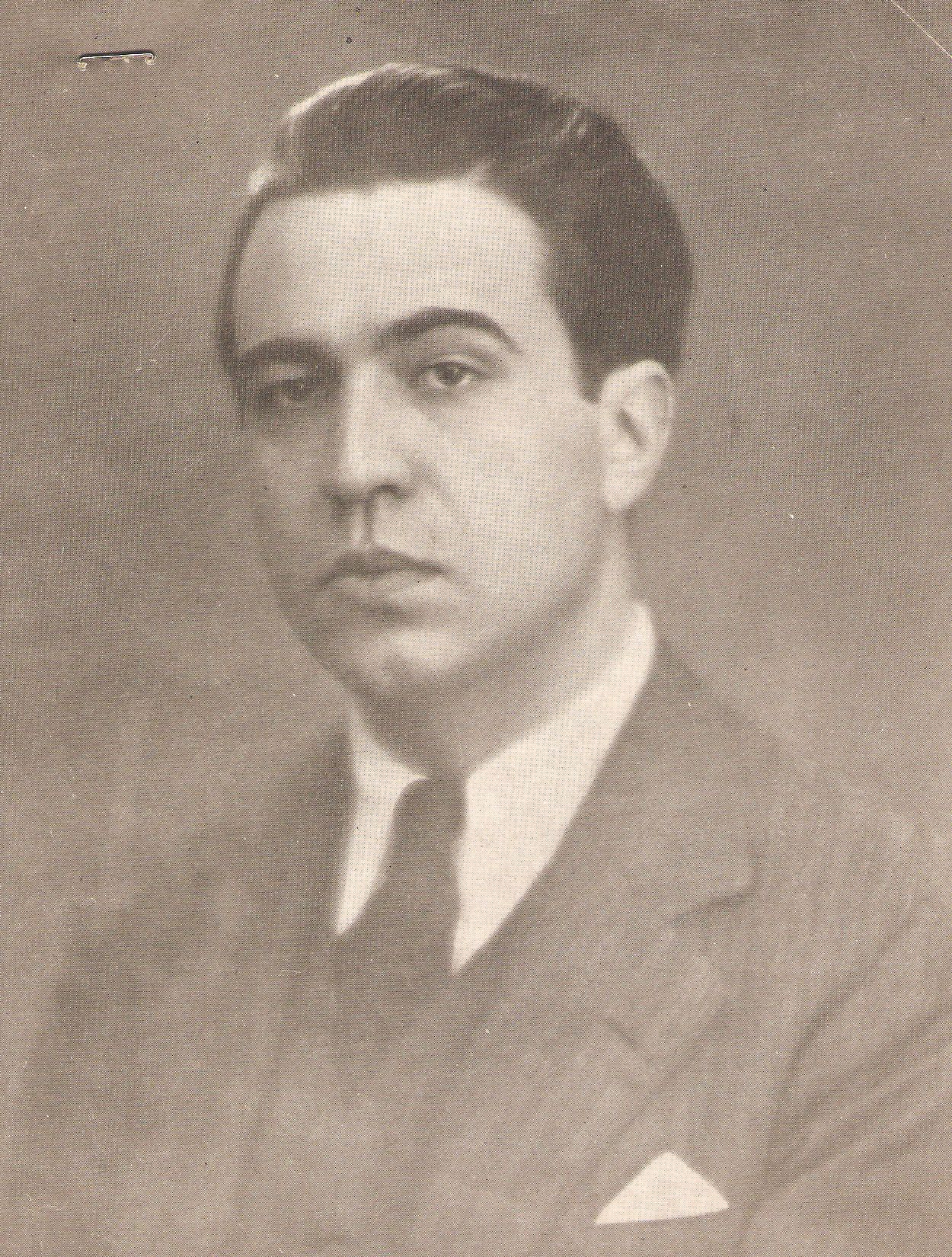

2nd Director-General of the UNESCO
- In office 1948–1952
- Preceded by: Julian Huxley
- Succeeded by: John Wilkinson Taylor (acting)

Personal details
- Born: 17 April 1902 Mexico City, Mexico
- Died: 13 May 1974 (aged 72) Mexico City, Mexico
- Resting place: Panteón de Dolores
- Occupation: Diplomat and writer
- Awards: Belisario Domínguez Medal of Honor; National Prize for Arts

Jaime Mario Emilio Torres Bodet (17 April 1902 – 13 May 1974) was a prominent Mexican politician and writer who served in the executive cabinet of three Presidents of Mexico. He was the second Director-General of the United Nations Educational, Scientific and Cultural Organization (UNESCO), serving from 1948 until his resignation in 1952.

== Life ==
Torres Bodet was born in Mexico City. His mother was Emilia Bodet Levallois, a Peruvian of French heritage, and his father was Alejandro Torres Girbent from Barcelona. The couple met in Peru, married and migrated to Mexico in the very late 19th century. His father was a promoter of operas and theatre, activities which impressed Jaime as a young child. Jaime was one of two children. He had a younger brother, Mario, who died very young and to whom Torres Bodet does not refer in his memoirs. His mother was a great influence on him, but his relationship with his father was less close as he was rarely home. He ran the Esperanza Iris Theater and arranged shows such as appearances by Enrico Caruso. The family was wealthy, living in a home on Donceles Street that allow them to see then-president Porfirio Díaz arrive for official business at the Chamber of Deputies across the street.

Both of Torres Bodet's parents stressed literature and the arts. His early education was the purview of his mother, who taught him piano, reading and the Gallic language. This allowed him to enter directly into the third grade when he started school. In 1912, he graduated the sixth grade, he received as a gift the collection of "The Natural Episodes" by Benito Pérez Galdós, along with many other books. He attended high school at the National Preparatory School, where his literary development began, befriending like-minded people in Bernardo Ortiz de Montellano, José Gorostiza, Carlos Pellicer and Luis Garrido.

Torres Bodet came of age during the Mexican Revolution. He published his first book of poems at age 16.

He lost sight in one eye in 1954, while returning to Mexico City from Cuernavaca.

He spent the last years of his life dedicated only to writing his memoirs. According to Solana, he planned to end his life after finishing them. He had decided he had done everything he wanted to do. His diplomatic career ended when he turned 65, forced to retire. He had a wife but no children or nieces and nephews on his side. His decision to commit suicide was also influenced by a 1956 book called The Temple of the Golden Pavilion by Yukio Mishima. He was impressed by the idea of destroying a perfect temple rather than letting it decay. He was also affected by the deaths of various friends and associates after long or debilitating illnesses. In 1974, he ended his life with by gunshot. The official version of the story stated that it was due to a long battle with colon cancer. Solana states Torres Bodet was fine both mentally and physically at the time of his death.

== Career ==
He spoke French, which he learned as a child. This opened both literary and diplomatic doors for him. He was a specialist in French literature, and later learned English and Italian.

At only 18 years of age, in 1920, Torres Bodet was appointed an administrator at the National Preparatory School as well as a teacher of literature at the School of Advanced Studies.In 1921, José Vasconcelos made him his personal secretary. Soon after, he was appointed the head of libraries for the Secretariat of Public Education. In addition to these responsibilities, he founded a magazine called Falange along with several friends and the support of Vasconcelos. He then was appointed to the rectory of the National University (today UNAM), tasked with formulating the legal basis of the new educational system.

In 1929, he published Biombos, Poesias, Destierro (Screens, Poetries, Unearthing). In the same year, he founded with a group of friends a magazine called Los Contemporáneos (Contemporaries). The group behind this publication would become known as the "no grupo" (not a group) or "grupo sin nombre" (nameless group) and consisted of Enrique González Rojo, Benardo Ortiz de Montellano, José Gorostiza, Salvador Novo, Xavier Villaurrutia along with Torres Bodet. The purpose of Contemporáneos was to promote an expressive and poetic movement called Nuevo Ateneo, which had begun in 1924. The publication was quickly criticized as for not being in line with the current revolutionary ideology, nor patriotic enough. In fact, it was apolitical, itself becoming a political statement

From 1938 to 1941 he worked with a younger generation of writers such as Rafael Solana, Octavio Paz, Efraín Huerta and Alberto Quintero on a project and publication called Taller Poético (Poetic Workshop). His work has fallen into relative obscurity since his death despite being well-appreciated during his time.

He had contact with various other writers such as García Lorca, Alberto del Toro Aguirre, Pedro Salinas (Generation of 27), Paul Valery and Valery Larbaud.

Between 1929 and the outbreak of the Second World War, Torres Bodet held diplomatic positions in Madrid, The Hague, Paris, Buenos Aires and Brussels. Torres Bodet was appointed the Undersecretary of Foreign Affairs (1940–1943) by president Manuel Ávila Camacho. He was appointed Secretary of Public Education (1943–46) by President Manuel Ávila Camacho; he then served as the Secretary of Foreign Affairs (1946–1948) under President Miguel Alemán Valdés. He was then elected the director-general of UNESCO on November 26, 1948 until 1952. After withdrawing from his position at UNESCO, Torres Bodet returned to Mexico. At the time, it was not possible for him to take on a government post, as the window for accepting high-level public positions had closed in mid-1952. In February 1953, he agreed with Alejandro Quijanoto to write a weekly piece for Quijantoto's newspaper Novedades. He was then ambassador of Mexico to France from 1954 to 1958. Later, in 1958–64, he was again appointed to serve as Secretary of Public Education, this time under President Adolfo López Mateos. He believed that the answer to Mexico's problem lie with education, that it could diminish crime, corruption, lack of employment, etc. This was particularly true with vocational education, despite himself being a poet. According to his personal secretary Rafael Solana, President Manuel Ávila Camacho offered to guarantee him the presidency, but Torres reminded him that it was prohibited under Article 82 of the Mexican Constitution as he was only a first generation Mexican. He retired from public life after his stint as the Secretary of Public Education, rejecting various positions that were offered to him.

=== Director-general of UNESCO ===
Torres Bodet served as director-general of the United Nations Educational, Scientific and Cultural Organization (UNESCO) from 1948 to 1952 after the sudden death of the former director-general Julian Huxley.

Torres Bodet always had a strong belief in the power of education and a concern for those in countries with less money and power. He strongly believed that education could help reduce such inequality which he believed was due to colonialism. Thus one of his major projects during his time at UNESCO was his proposal for six teacher training centers all around the world (including India, Egypt, Mexico, and Iraq) so as to promote literacy. These agencies were known as Regional Centers for Fundamental Education. One of these was CREFAL (Regional Center for Fundamental Education for Latin America) in Pátzcuaro, Michoacán which opened in 1951 and was led by Lucas Ortiz. Another 34 centers across 15 countries were launched. Torres Bodet also faced severe issues of budget shortage during his time at UNESCO, beginning with a budget of 8 million, and at the end of his directorship a budget of 8.2 million. He frequently expressed frustration with this situation, as it made it extremely difficult to get anything significant done. In 1949, Torres Bodet and Arthur Ramos spearheaded the famous UNESCO statements on race: Statement on race (Paris, July 1950) and Statement on the nature of race and race differences (Paris, June 1951 ). These statements asserted that racism was a "social myth" that needed to be stopped at the individual level by means of anti-racist education efforts.

Torres Bodet's time as the director-general was fraught with the issues of a small budget and the domineering and infighting of the western countries (the USA, France, England) that dominated the orgnanization. All this on top of the turmoil of the Cold War lead Torres Bodet to resign from UNESCO in 1952. In his 1971 memoir El desierto internacional (The International Desert) he described his time at UNESCO: "in 1952, faced with the choice between resignation and departure, I chose to leave. I do not regret having done so. My resignation served, to a certain extent, as a warning. Indeed, until an authentic peace is built upon a foundation of growing trust in cultural values and human rights, every free conscience will continue to feel—all around it—what I felt so often during that period of my life: the anguish of crying out in the midst of an immense desert—the most populous and darkest of deserts: the international desert."(page 3).

From 1955 to 1958 he was Ambassador to France.

He received the Medal of Honor Belisario Domínguez from the Senate in 1971.

He was also a member of the Mexican Language Academy (the national correspondent agency to the Spanish Royal Academy) and of the National College.

Torres Bodet died by suicide in Mexico City on 13 May 1974.

== Works ==
=== Poetry ===
- Poemas juveniles (1916–1917)
- Fervor (1918)
- Canciones (1922)
- El corazón delirante (1922)
- Nuevas canciones (1923)
- La casa (1923)
- Los días (1923)
- Poemas (1924)
- Biombo (1925)
- Destierro (1930)
- Cripta (1937)
- Sonetos (1949)
- Fronteras (1954)
- Sin tregua (1957)
- Trébol de cuatro hojas (1958)
- Poemas recientes (1965–1966)
- Invitación al viaje (?)

=== Narrative ===
- Margarita de niebla (1927)
- La educación sentimental (1929)
- Proserpina rescatada (1931)
- Estrella de día (1933)
- Primero de enero (1934)
- Sombras (1935)
- Nacimiento de Venus y otros relatos (1941)

=== Essays ===
- Lecturas clásicas para niños (1925)
- Contemporáneos (1928)
- Coordinación interamericana (1941)
- Misión del escritor (1942)
- Mensaje a la juventud (1944)
- Educación y concordia internacional (1948)
- La misión de la UNESCO (1949)

=== Memoirs ===
- Años contra el tiempo (Years Against Time, 1969)
- La victoria sin alas (Victory Without Wings, 1970)
- El desierto internacional (The International Desert, 1971)
- La tierra prometida (The Promised Land, 1972)
- Equinoccio (Equinox, 1974, published posthumously)

Awards
| Preceded by Rosendo Salazar | Belisario Domínguez Medal of Honor; 1971 | Succeeded by Ignacio Ramos Praslow |
Non-profit organization positions
| Preceded by Julian Huxley | 2nd Directors General of UNESCO; 1948–1952 | Succeeded by John Wilkinson Taylor |
