= José Gorostiza =

Mexican poet, educator, and diplomat (1901–1973)

- Born: José Gorostiza Alcalá; 10 November 1901; Villahermosa, Tabasco, Mexico
- Died: 16 March 1973 (aged 71); Mexico City, Federal District, Mexico
- Education: Universidad Nacional Autónoma de México
- Occupations: Poet, educator, diplomat
- Writing career
- Language: Spanish
- Period: 1925–1969
- Genres: Poetry, essay
- Notable works: Canciones para cantar en las barcas Muerte sin fin
- Notable awards: Premio Nacional de Ciencias y Artes; 1968
- Literary movement: Los Contemporáneos

José Gorostiza Alcalá (10 November 1901 – 16 March 1973) was a Mexican poet, educator, and diplomat. For his achievements in the poetic arts, he was made a member of the Academia Mexicana de la Lengua.

== Biography ==
José Gorostiza was born in the riverine city of Villahermosa, then known as San Juan Bautista, to Celestino Gorostiza and Elvira Alcalá de Gorostiza. He was a descendant of the Spanish playwright Manuel Eduardo de Gorostiza. His younger brother Celestino would also become an important artist. He moved to Mexico City to attend the National Preparatory School and later the Colegio Francés de Mascarones. After graduating from the Universidad Nacional Autónoma de México, he worked first as a professor at his alma mater and then at the National School of Teachers in 1932.

After teaching followed a series of important administrative jobs in the government: head of the Department of Fine Arts at the Secretariat of Public Education (1932-1935) and head of the Department of Publicity at the Secretariat of Foreign Relations (1935-1937). Subsequently, he served in various diplomatic and ambassadorial capacities, including: Director General of Political Affairs at the Secretariat of Foreign Relations, Director General of the Diplomatic Service (Secretariat of Foreign Relations) (1944), Ambassador to Greece (1950-1951), Secretary of Foreign Relations (1964), and head of the National Commission of Nuclear Energy (1965-1970).

=== Literary endeavors ===
Between 1928 and 1931, he was part of the influential vanguardist group Los Contemporáneos, to which Jorge Cuesta, Salvador Novo, Gilberto Owen, Carlos Pellicer, Jaime Torres Bodet, and Xavier Villaurrutia also belonged. His literary output, though sparse, was rich in content. His first book of poetry, Canciones para cantar en las barcas (Songs to Sing on Boats), appeared in 1925. After a lull of fourteen years came what is considered his masterpiece, Muerte sin fin (Death without End). In 1964, he published Poesía (Poetry), a collection of his previously published work plus a section dedicated to unfinished pieces called Del poema frustrado (Of the Frustrated Poem). In 1969, he published a book of essays titled Prosa (Prose).

On May 14, 1954, he was elected a member of the Academia Mexicana de la Lengua, at the occasion of which he read an essay entitled "Notas sobre poesía" ("Notes on Poetry"). On March 22, 1955, he became a numerary member of the same and held seat 25. He died, aged 71, in Mexico City.

== Awards ==
- National Prize for Arts and Sciences (Premio Nacional de Ciencias y Artes) (1968)
- Grand Decoration of Honour in Silver with Sash for Services to the Republic of Austria (1958)

== Selected published works ==
- Canciones para cantar en las barcas, 1925
- Muerte sin fin, 1939
- Poesía: Notas sobre poesía, Canciones para cantar en las barcas, Del poema frustrado, Muerte sin fin, 1964
- Prosa, 1969
- Epistolario, 1918-1940. Edited by Guillermo Sheridan, 1988
- Poesía completa. Edited by Guillermo Sheridan, 1996

== See also ==
- Rosario Castellanos
- Carlos Fuentes
- Octavio Paz
- Sergio Pitol
- Alfonso Reyes
