= Clementina Otero =

Mexican actress (1909–1996)

- Born: Clementina Otero Mena; September 13, 1909
- Died: September 30, 1996 (aged 87)
- Occupation(s): stage actress, artistic director
- Spouse: Carlos Barrios Castelazo

Clementina Otero de Barrios (September 13, 1909 – September 30, 1996) was a Mexican actress and belonged to the pioneers of Mexican avant-garde theater. She was the last living member of the Los Contemporáneos group.

Otero was born to Antonio Otero Moreno and his wife Clementina Mena Cantón. It is reported, that she was 17 years old, when Celestino Gorostiza, who was linked with her older sister Araceli, asked for allowance of her mother, to make her an actress. She gave her debut in the Teatro Ulises, where she became known. During this time, the poet Gilberto Owen, who was also part of the theater group, felt in love with her, and wrote a series of love letters to her. She had an intense friendship with Xavier Villaurrutia, who made her a participant of daring theatrical adventures. Otero also was actress of the later Teatro Orientación.

Later Otero was director of the Escuela de Arte Teatral (School of Theatrical Art) of the Instituto Nacional de Bellas Artes y Literatura (INBA). She was married to Carlos Barrios Castelazo.
