= Enrique González Rojo =

Enrique González Rojo may refer to:

- Enrique González Rojo, Sr. (1899–1939), Mexican writer and father of the below
- Enrique González Rojo, Jr. (1928–2021), Mexican writer and son of the above
