= Guillermo Sheridan =

Mexican literary critic, scholar and public commentator

- Born: Guillermo Humberto Sheridan Prieto; 27 August 1950 (age 76); Mexico City, Mexico
- Education: Universidad Iberoamericana (BA); University of East Anglia (MA); National Autonomous University of Mexico (PhD)
- Writing career
- Language: Spanish
- Subject: Modern Mexican poetry
- Notable awards: Xavier Villaurrutia Award (1989), Fernando Benítez for Cultural Journalism (2011)

Guillermo Humberto Sheridan Prieto (born 27 August 1950) is a Mexican literary critic, scholar and public commentator.

== Life and work ==
Sheridan was born in Mexico City. He was a Chevening Scholar at the University of East Anglia in 1986. He was awarded a doctorate in Mexican literature by the National Autonomous University of Mexico. He is a member of Mexico's Sistema Nacional de Investigadores, a government agency established in 1984 to promote both the quantity and quality of research.

As a scholar, most of his writing deals with the history of Mexican modern poetry in books like Los Contemporáneos ayer (1985), Un corazón adicto (1990, a biography of Ramón López Velarde), México en 1932 (1999, a study of Mexican nationalism), Poeta con Paisaje (2004, a biography of Nobel laureate poet Octavio Paz), Tres ensayos sobre Gilberto Owen (2008, essays about a Mexican poet), Paralelos y meridianos (2010, literary essays), Señales debidas (2011, essays about Mexican writers and poets of the 20th century) and Malas palabras. Jorge Cuesta y la revista Examen (2011, a history of modern literary censorship in Mexico). His latest book, Habitación con retratos (2015) is the second volume of a trilogy about Octavio Paz's life and work. Sheridan has also edited works by poets such as José Juan Tablada, Ramón López Velarde and José Gorostiza.

Sheridan has written extensively about politics, education and everyday life in some of Mexico's most prestigious newspapers, such as Reforma and La Jornada. He was a monthly collaborator to Octavio Paz's review Vuelta, and continues to publish a monthly article in Enrique Krauze’s Letras Libres and a weekly commentary in El Universal, a major daily newspaper. Several volumes of his chronicles have been published over the years: Frontera norte (1988), Cartas de Copilco y otras postales (1993), Lugar a dudas (1999), El encarguito (2007) and Viaje al centro de mi tierra (2011). His writings about the problems of higher education in Mexico were collected in Allá en el campus grande (2001). In 1996 he published an infamous satirical novel about Mexican politics, El dedo de oro (Alfaguara, 1996). He has a blog called "El Minutario", hosted by Letras Libres.

Sheridan has also written about Mexican art. The book Manuel Álvarez Bravo: Eyes in His Eyes, a collection of unpublished photographs, published by D.A.P. in 2007, has a text written by Sheridan.

He has been a longtime collaborator of film director Nicolás Echevarría, with whom he wrote the script for the 1990 motion picture Cabeza de Vaca and several documentaries about Mexican indigenous cultures.

A full-time professor and researcher at the National Autonomous University of Mexico, Sheridan has been a visiting scholar at the University of Aberdeen in Scotland; at the Sorbonne Nouvelle in France; and at Boston University and the University of Texas in the United States.

In 1989 he was awarded the Xavier Villaurrutia Award, a national literary prize.

In 2011 he received the "Fernando Benítez Cultural Journalism" national award by the Guadalajara International Book Fair.

In 2014 he received the "Ramón López Velarde Prize", a national literary award.

In 2019 he received the "Jorge Ibargüengoitia Prize", a national literary award.

== Sources ==
- Aurora Ocampo et al., Diccionario de escritores mexicanos del siglo XX, vol. VII. México, Universidad Nacional Autónoma de México, 2006. ISBN 970-32-3209-4.
