= Ermilo Abreu Gómez =

Mexican writer and lecturer (1894–1971)

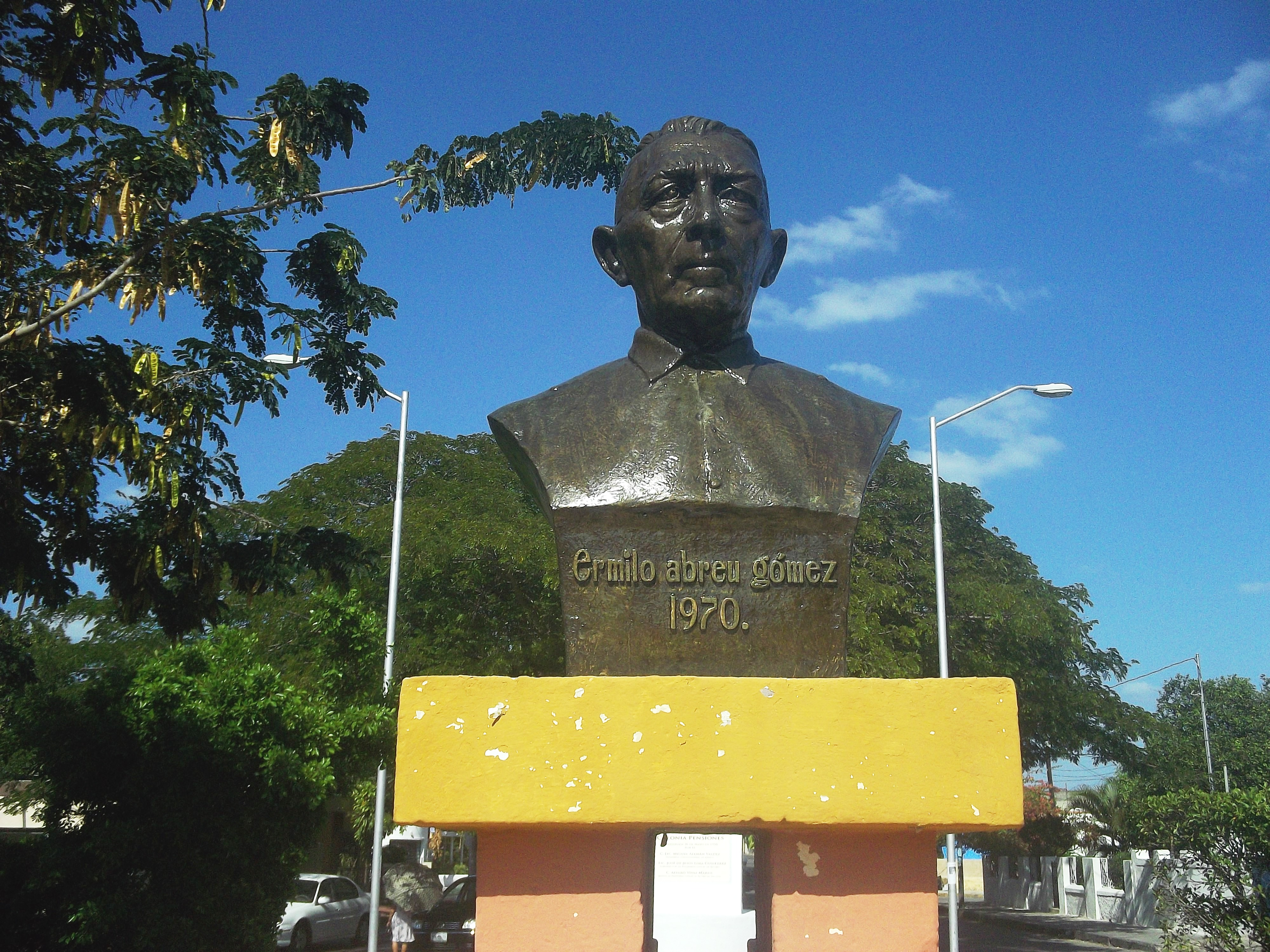
Bust of Ermilo Abreu Gómez in Mérida

Ermilo Abreu Gómez (September 18, 1894 in Mérida – July 14, 1971 in Mexico City) was a Mexican writer, journalist and lecturer. He was a member of the Mexican Academy of Language from 1963. He was also a professor in several universities in the United States.

== Partial list of works ==
His literary work was varied, over a long period of time:

- La Xtabay. 1919
- El Corcovado. 1924
- Clásicos. Románticos. Modernos (1934)
- Canek. 1940
  - in English: Canek. History and legend of a Maya hero.; transl. & introd. by Mario L. Dávila, Carter Wilson. University of California Press, Berkeley 1979 (cf. Google books)
- Héroes Mayas. Zamná. Cocom. Canek. 1942
  - in German: Geschichten von den Maja-Indianern. transl. Ludwig Renn. Aufbau, Weimar 1948
- Un Loro y tres Golondrinas (1946)
- Quetzalcóatl, sueño y vigilia (1947)
- Naufragio de indios (1951)
- La conjura de Xinúm (1958)
- Cuentos para contar al fuego (1959)
- Sor Juana Inés de la Cruz, bibliografía y biblioteca (1934)
- Diálogo del buen decir (1961)

The interest that Sor Juana Inés de la Cruz woke up in him became the passion of his life and it also led him to become her main critic. His most well-known work is Canek (1940), a story about the Maya revolutionary.

As a curiosity, the commentary of the author on the book Canek: "And Nymph lost the best pages!". (Nymph was his wife who typed the original).

== Sources ==
- Michel de Certeau, La escritura de la historia, Mexico, Universidad Iberoamericana-Departamento de Historia, 1985.
- Miguel Gamboa Carrillo, Apuntes sobre la vida y obra de Ermilio Abreu Gómez, Mérida, Yucatán Escuela Normal Superior de Yucatán, 1981.
- Jorge Pech, La sabiduría de la emoción. Vida y literatura de Ermilo Abreu Gómez, Mexico, Editorial Tierra Adentro-Conaculta, 1998.
- Guillermo Sheridan, Los Contemporáneos ayer, Mexico, FCE, 1985

== See also ==
- Mexican literature
