= Teatro Orientación =

The Teatro Orientación was a modern theater group in Mexico City, that was established in 1932 by Isabela Corona and Julio Bracho, and existed until 1938.

Most of the theater group members, which was directed by Celestino Gorostiza, were members of the Los Contemporáneos group, and were members of the former Teatro Ulises before. In contrast to the former Teatro Ulises, the Teatro de Orientación was government-sponsored. In the beginning, the scenarios also based mainly on translations of scripts of notable international writers, but later the group staged own plays.

The Teatro Orientación group was an experimental theater group from the 1930s. It has given its name to the Teatro Orientación, a theater in Mexico City that opened its doors on April 30 of 1958.

Teatro Orientación in Mexico City has capacity for 351 people and its style is Italian.

== See also ==
- Teatro Ulises
