= Guadalupe Marín =

Mexican model and novelist

- Portrait of Guadalupe Marín de Rivera by Edward Weston, 1924
- Born: María Guadalupe Marín Preciado; October 16, 1895; Ciudad Guzmán, Jalisco, Mexico
- Died: September 16, 1983 (aged 87); Mexico City, Mexico
- Other names: Lupe Marín
- Occupations: Model, novelist
- Spouses: Diego Rivera (m. 1922; div. 1928) Jorge Cuesta (m. 1928; div. 1933)
- Children: 3, including Ruth Rivera Marín

Cover of Marín's tell-all book La Única (1938)

Guadalupe "Lupe" Marín (October 16, 1895 – September 16, 1983), born María Guadalupe Marín Preciado, was a Mexican model and novelist.

== Biography ==
Marín was born in Ciudad Guzmán, Jalisco, Mexico. When aged eight, Marín moved with her family to Guadalajara. In 1922, she became the second wife of muralist Diego Rivera. She was the mother of Rivera's two youngest daughters, Ruth and Guadalupe Rivera Marín. Marín was married to Rivera for six years, ending in 1928.

She was married to the poet Jorge Cuesta on November 9, 1928; they divorced on April 13, 1933. She had one son from her second marriage, Lucio Antonio Cuesta-Marín, born in 1930.

Marín was the subject of portrait paintings by Rivera, Frida Kahlo and Juan Soriano. She is featured in the Rivera mural Creation, for which she modeled as Strength, Song, and Woman, and modeled nude as Earth for Rivera's Chapingo chapel mural while several months pregnant. She also modeled for photographer Edward Weston. Of the 1924 portrait, Weston wrote "I am finishing the portrait of Lupe. It is a heroic head, the best I have done in Mexico."

In 1938, Marín's semi-autobiographical novel La Única (The Unique Woman) was published. Her book La Única was banned in Mexico for many years owing to its erotic nature. In 2003, the novel and Marín were cited by author Salvador A. Oropesa in his book The Contemporáneos Group as being a feminist component of a counterculture writers' movement in post-revolutionary Mexico. She also wrote Un día patrio (A Patriotic Day) in 1941, in which she expressed political ideas.

== Legacy and death ==
Marín died in Mexico City on September 16, 1983, at the age of 87.

A novel in Spanish about Marín and Rivera's time together, Dos Veces única by Elena Poniatowska, was published in 2016.

She was portrayed by Valeria Golino in the 2002 film Frida.
