= Malú Block =

Mexican artist (1904-1989)

María Luisa "Malú" Block
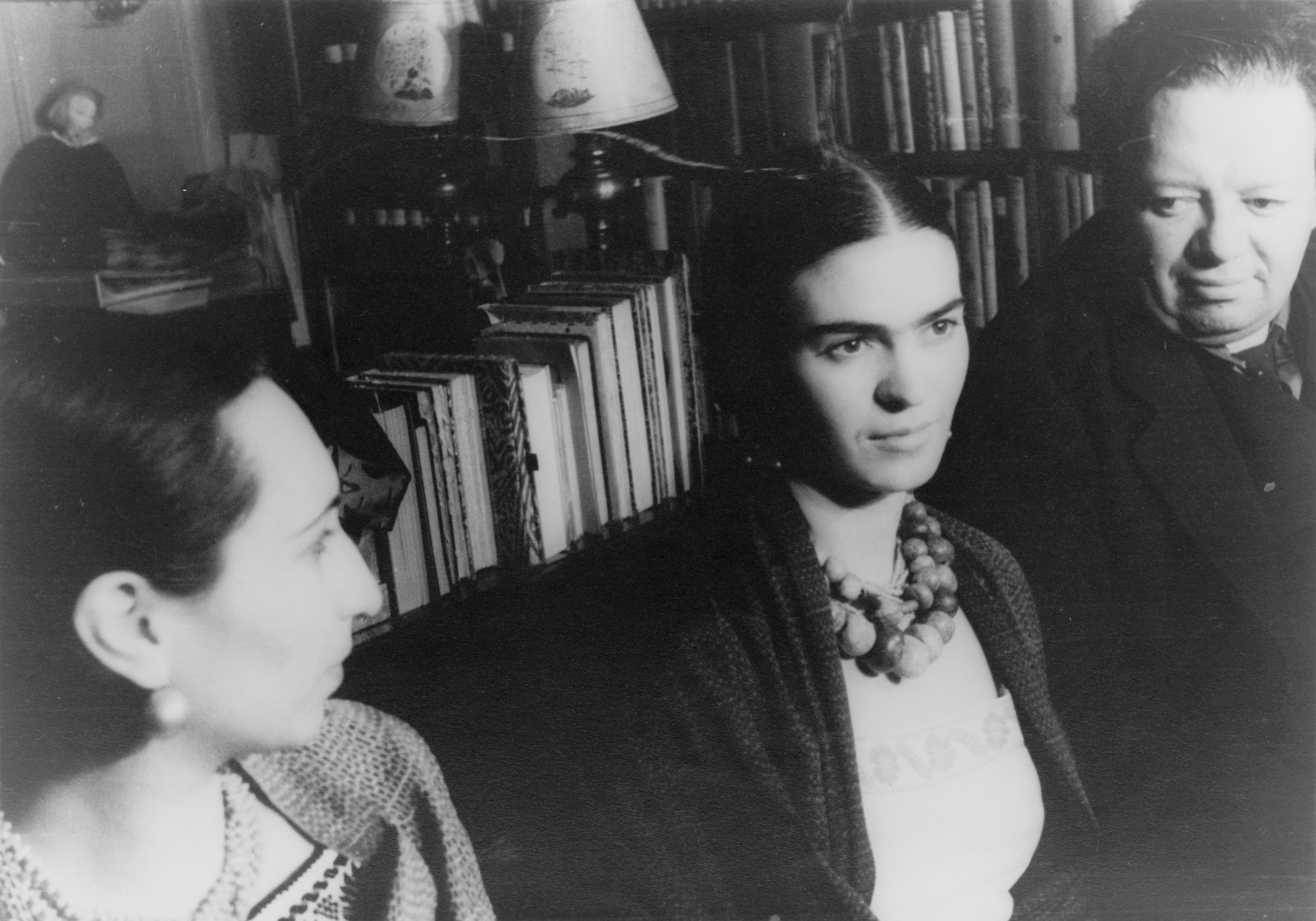
- Malú Block (left), Frida Kahlo and Diego Rivera, 1932.(Photo: Carl Van Vechten)
- Born: María Luisa Cabrera; 1904
- Died: 1989 (aged 84–85)
- Known for: Painting
- Spouse: Harry Block

María Luisa "Malú" Block (née Cabrera; 9 October 1904 – 1989) was a Mexican artist and arts patron.

Block was born in Coyoacán, Mexico City, the daughter of lawyer, writer and politician Luis Cabrera Lobato and his wife, Guillermina. In 1931 she married Harry Block (1902–1975) in New York, a former liaison man between Constantin Oumansky in Washington and Vicente Lombardo Toledano in Mexico City and regular Mexican correspondent for The Nation. They had two children, named Malú and Félipe. Around 1935 the family moved from the United States to Mexico.

Malú Block was co-founder and co-financier of the Teatro Ulises.
