= Bernardo Ortiz de Montellano =

Mexican writer (1899-1949)

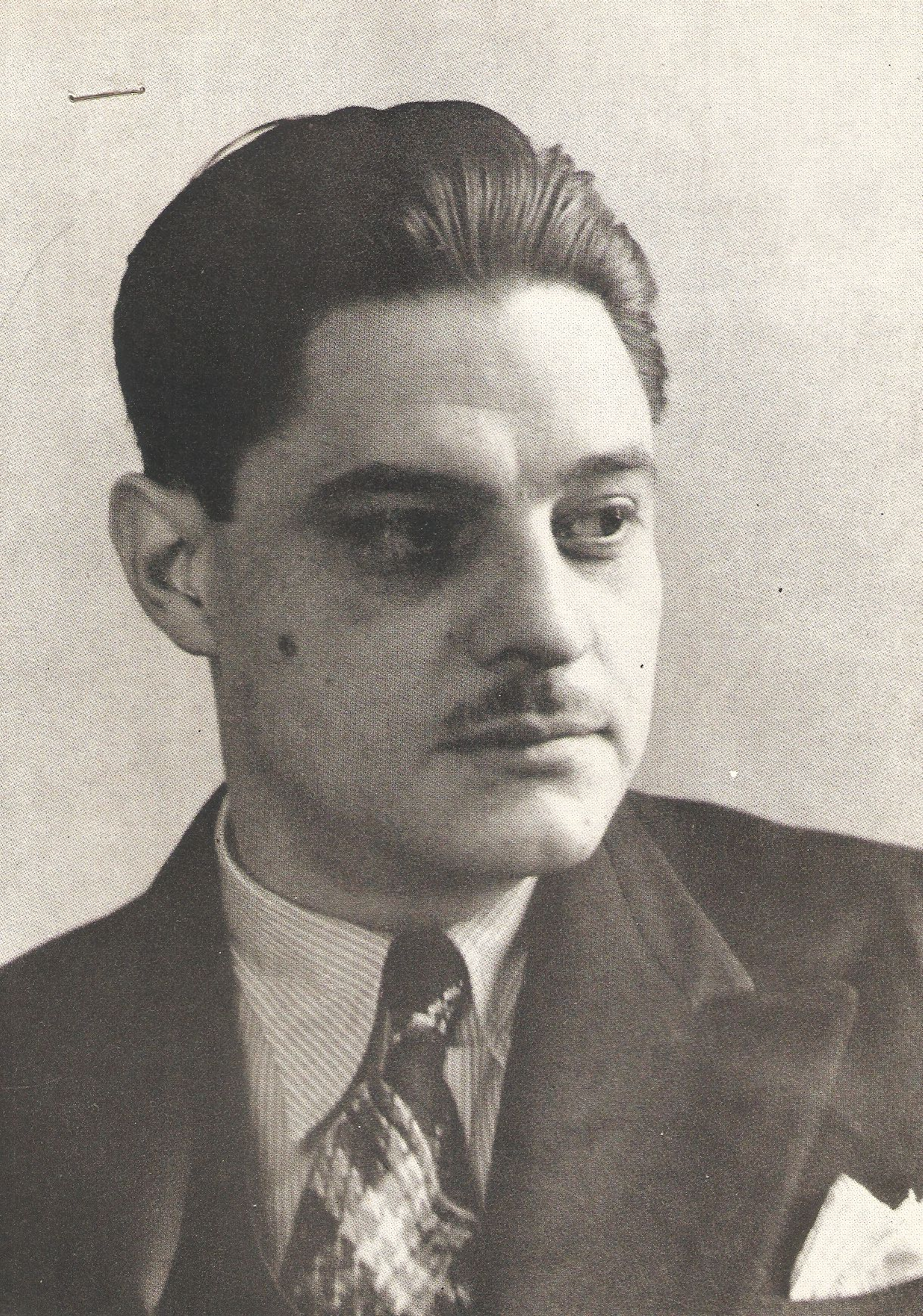
- Born: January 3, 1899; Mexico City
- Died: April 13, 1949 (aged 50); Mexico City
- Occupations: writer, literary critic, editor, teacher
- Writing career
- Genres: poetry, essays, biographies
- Notable works: Sueño y poesía, 1952

Bernardo Ortiz de Montellano (Mexico City, January 3, 1899 – Mexico City, April 13, 1949) was a modern Mexican poet, literary critic, editor, and teacher.

Ortiz de Montellano visited the Escuela Nacional Preparatoria. He taught at the Escuela de Verano, a school of the Universidad Nacional Autónoma de México (UNAM), and served as bookrevisor of the Secretaría de Educación Pública (SEP).

He was member of the literary group Nuevo Ateneo de la Juventud, which was founded in 1918 by Ortiz de Montellano, Jaime Torres Bodet, José Gorostiza, and others. The members of the group wrote for magazines and journals. In 1928 he was co-founder of the magazine "Contemporáneos" and was director of it from June 1928 through December 1931. He was also an occasional editor of the literary magazine "Letras de México", published from 1937 to 1947, chief-editor of "El Trovador", and was co-founder of the Cuadernos Americanos group.

== Works ==
- Avidez, 1921
- El trompo de los siete colores, 1925
- Antología de cuentos mexicanos (prose)
- Red, 1928
- Literatura de la Revolución y literatura revolucionaria (essay), 1930
- Pantomima (theatrical piece), 1930
- Primer sueño, 1931
- El Sombrerón, (theatrical piece), 1931
- Sueños, 1933
- La poesía indígena de México, 1935
- Muerte del cielo azul, 1936
- Martes de carnaval
- Figura, amor y muerte de Amado Nervo (biographical work), 1943
- El Sombrerón, 1946
- La cabeza de Salomé
- Sombra y luz de Ramón López Velarde (biographical work), 1946
- Literatura indígena y colonial mexicana (essay), 1946
- Conversación epistolar a propósito del libro Sueños, 1946

Compiled and posthumously edited:

- Sueño y poesía, by Wilberto Cantón, 1952
- Obras en Prosa, by María de Lourdes Franco Bagnouls, 1988
