= El tercer Fausto =

Play by Mexican author Salvador Novo

- Original title: Le troisième Faust, Tragédie breve
- Original language: French
- Written by: Salvador Novo
- Based on: Faust
- Characters: Alberto, Armando, El diablo
- Subject: Homosexuality
- Genre: Drama

Premiere
- Date: 1971
- Place: Xola theater, Mexico

El tercer Fausto (originally published in French as Le troisième Faust, Tragédie breve), is a play by Mexican writer Salvador Novo, initially published in 1934. It is considered one of the author's most important theatrical works. The plot, which references the classic German drama Faust (1808) by Johann Wolfgang von Goethe, follows the story of a man who decides to sell his soul to the devil to change his sex so he can seduce and win the love of another man.

The play was originally written in French in 1932, and published two years later. At the time of its publication, Novo believed that a play about homosexuality could be controversial, but the piece actually earned international recognition. The Spanish version was not published in Mexico until 1956, when the Fondo de Cultura Económica included it as a part of the compilation Diálogos.

== Characters ==
- Alberto: The play's protagonist. He is in love with his friend Armando and, in an effort to win him over, he decides to sell his soul to the devil in exchange for being transformed into a woman. During the second act, he appears in the body of an anonymous woman and tries to seduce his friend.
- Armando: Alberto's friend and the object of his affections. Although Alberto does not know it, Armando is also in love with him.
- El diablo (the devil): During his conversation with Alberto, the devil suggests various alternative ways to win over Armando and attempts to avoid transforming him into a woman. He ultimately agrees to the deal, but refuses to accept Alberto's soul and instead only asks to secretly witness the results.

== Publication and performances ==
Novo's main motivation for publishing the work in French and in Paris was the fear that it would be censored in Mexico because of the era's machismo culture. This worry was not unsubstantiated; various political figures in Mexico, including Pedro Henríquez Ureña and Lázaro Cárdenas, reacted negatively to his previous works, with Henríquez Ureña even refusing to hire Novo. Because of this, the first edition of the play was published in French as a luxury edition of 50 numbered copies that were not sold openly. In November 1955, Novo described his decision to publish the play in France as "juvenile pedantry".

It was several decades before the play was performed publicly. In 1955, Novo planned to show it in Mexico City along with five of his other short pieces in the La Capilla theater, which Novo had founded two years prior. However, despite the fact that the performance had been announced in the printed program, the play was cancelled due to the fear of a possible negative reaction over its subject matter. In fact, that same year, a play about lesbians titled Conflicto put on at La Capilla had provoked a hostile response, which lead to its cancellation and attempts to close the theater. The next year, El tercer Fausto was published in Spanish for the first time.

The first-known public performance of the play came finally in 1971, after the actress Marilú Elígaza proposed that Novo put on some of his plays in the Xola theater. However, this was only a reading of the play, not a full production.

== Analysis ==
In El tercer Fausto, Novo criticizes the archetype of masculinity in Mexico in the early 20th century using satire and humor. This approach was a part of the style of Novo's plays in this period, and he had shortly before formed the group Teatro Ulises along with other playwrights to create alternative works that criticized the traditional, nationalist ideas in Mexican theater of the time.

According to the critic Frank Dauster, the play reflected on homosexuality in a style similar to that of authors like André Gide. In the first act, Alberto makes it clear that he does not feel like a "normal" man in the sense of what is expected in a heteronormative society, which is why transforming into a woman is the only way he can conceive of being able to love his friend Armando. Faced with this request, the devil makes three attempts to dissuade him. First, he takes a philosophical approach in defense of homosexual love, but Alberto replies that the "customs" of the society they live in make their conception of morality less "elastic". The devil then presents examples in art, like the book Corydon, but Alberto points out that he does not want Armando to love him based on the example of literary works. Finally, the devil proposes moving to Europe and using scientific means to accomplish his goal, but Alberto rejects this too and claims that he would only trust a "miracle". According to professor Carlos Mejía, Alberto's strict vision of masculinity is what makes him reject each of these alternatives because a romantic relationship between the two men would be, in his eyes, incompatible with the idealized masculinity that he ascribes to Armando.

At the end of the story, Alberto realizes that, in reality, Armando loved him all along, but, like him, he would never have dared to confess it. As such, what makes the love between them impossible is not that they were both men, but their belief that the only way to be together was to adapt themselves to the model of heterosexual love promoted by society at the time. It seems that the devil understands this, and the play does not depict him as evil, but rather as someone outside of the moral norms that limit the characters, which is why he attempts to convince Alberto that it is not necessary to transform into a woman to find love. According to professor Facundo Saxe, the work's dénouement is how Novo expresses the idea that LGBT people will not find happiness through attempts to assimilate conservative morality.

== Bibliography ==
- Mejía Suárez, Carlos Mario (2016). "Los hombres y sus barbas. Visibilidad y atenuación del deseo homosexual en 'Tercer Fausto' de Salvador Novo" [Men and their beards. Visibility and attenuation of homosexual desire in Salvador Novo's 'Tercer Fausto']. Chasqui (in Spanish). 42 (2): 17–27. JSTOR 24810822.
- Facundo, Saxe (2015). "El Fausto y la opción queer en El tercer Fausto de Salvador Novo" [Faust and the queer option in El tercer Fausto by Salvador Novo] (PDF). Journaler@s (in Spanish). 2 (2): 283–291. Archived from the original (PDF) on 2023-05-22.
