= 40 Warships =

Mexican poetry anthology

40 Warships: An Anthology of Poetry and its Publishers (Spanish: 40 barcos de guerra: antología de poesía y sus editoriales) is an anthology of Mexican poetry published in September 2009. The anthology brought together 42 independent publishing projects through a self-managed effort and an open call—local initiatives from various states across the Mexican Republic that operated without government support. The edition was led by the publishing house Verso Destierro, headed by Adriana Tafoya.

== History ==
The preparations for the 40 Warships anthology took place within the framework of the 1st National Meeting of Independent Poetry, held in 2008 at Fábrica de Artes y Oficios Oriente facilities in Mexico City. During this event, the career of Mexican poet Enrique González Rojo Jr. was celebrated; he later contributed an introduction to the anthology.

== Included poets ==
40 Warships brought together 42 independent Mexican editorial projects. Each project chose four poets representative of their specific vision, resulting in an anthology of 168 poets with the sole inclusion criteria of the "self-managed will that unites the poets and editors who compose it". Its pages include long-established poets—such as Max Rojas, Raúl Renán, Mirtha Luz Pérez, and Norma Bazúa—alongside young poets who had never been anthologized before.
