= Statue of Enrique González Martínez =

Statue in Guadalajara, Jalisco, Mexico

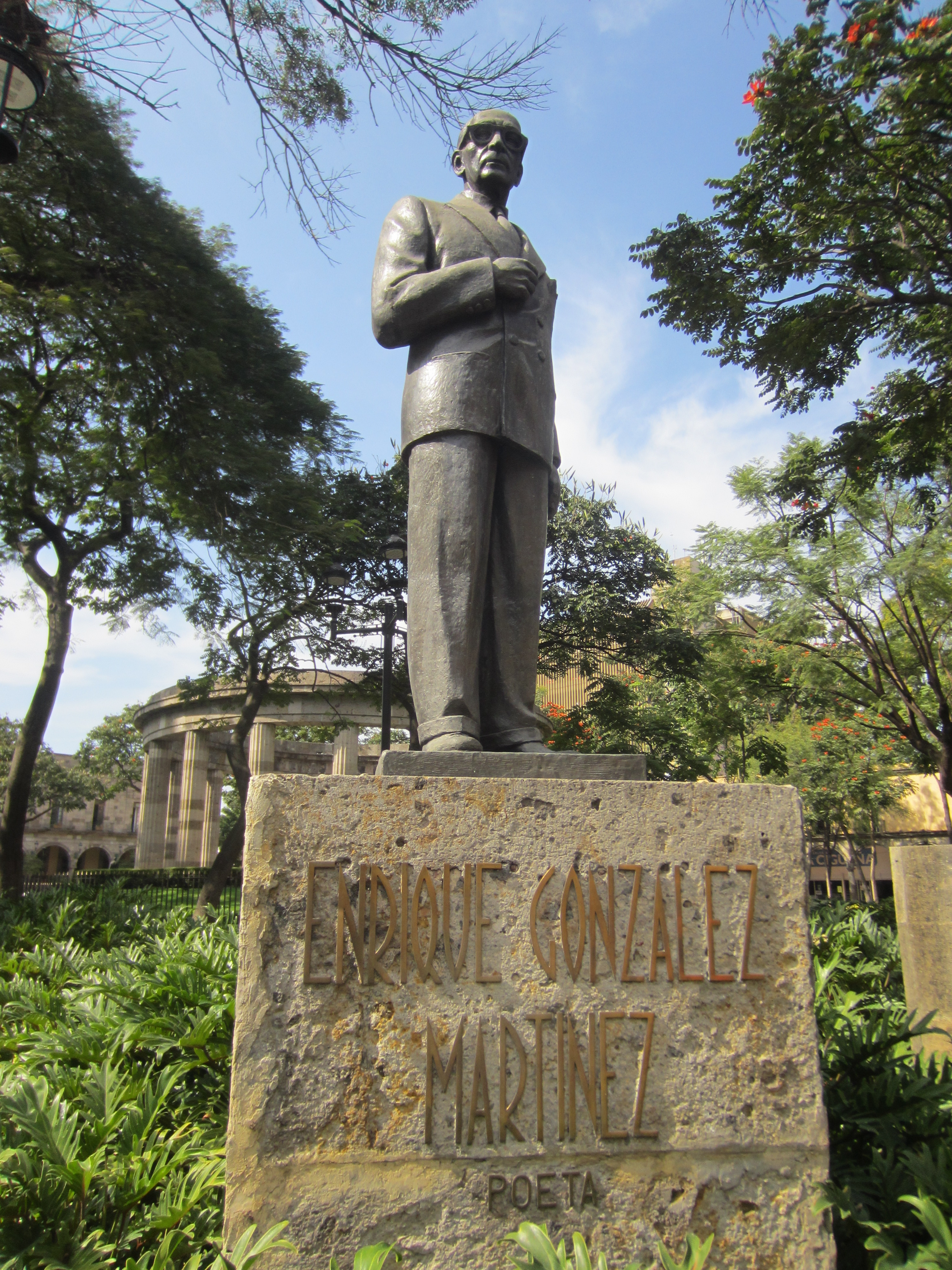
- The statue in 2021
- Year: 1971
- Subject: Enrique González Martínez
- Location: Guadalajara, Jalisco, Mexico; 20°40′39.1″N 103°20′48″W

A statue of Enrique González Martínez is installed along the Rotonda de los Jaliscienses Ilustres, in Centro, Guadalajara, in the Mexican state of Jalisco. The statue was unveiled on the 100th anniversary of his birthday, on 13 April 1971.
