= Julio Jiménez Rueda =

Mexican lawyer, writer, playwright and diplomat (1896–1960)

- Born: April 10, 1896; Mexico City
- Died: April 10, 1960 (aged 64); Mexico City
- Education: Universidad Nacional de México
- Occupations: lawyer, writer, playwright and diplomat

Julio Jiménez Rueda (April 10, 1896 – June 25, 1960) was a Mexican lawyer, writer, playwright and diplomat.

== Biography ==
Jiménez Rueda studied at the Escuela Nacional Preparatoria, and graduated in law at the Universidad Nacional de México (later UNAM) in 1919. Later on, he was appointed as the director of the Escuela Nacional de Arte Teatral of UNAM. He completed a doctoral degree of philosophy and literature in 1935. As a diplomat, he served in Montevideo in 1920, and afterwards in Buenos Aires until 1922. Back in Mexico he was the director of the General Archive of the Nation, and later president of the Centro Mexicano de Escritores. In 1923 he promoted the creation of the Municipal Theater, fostered the creation of the Unión de Autores Dramáticos (Dramatic Writers' Union), and participated in the Teatro Ulises movement. He became a corresponding member of the Academia Mexicana de la Lengua on August 7, 1935, and of the Academia Mexicana de la Historia in 1954. He directed the Faculty of Philosophy and Literature of the UNAM, where he taught Spanish literature for many years. He also was co-founder of the Instituto Internacional de Literatura Iberoamericana (IILI).

== Works ==
- Cuentos y diálogos, 1918
- Sor Adoración del Divino Verbo, 1923
- Lo que ella no pudo prever, 1923
- Moisn. Historia de judaizantes e inquisidores, 1924
- La silueta de humo, 1928
- Resúmenes de literatura mexicana (essay), 1928
- Juan Ruiz de Alarcón (essay), 1934
- La desventura del Conde Kadski, 1935
- Vidas reales que parecen imaginarias
- Don Pedro Moya de Contreras, primer inquisidor de México (essay), 1944
- Herejías y supersticiones de la Nueva España (essay),1946
- Novelas coloniales, 1947
- El humanismo, el barroco y la contrarreforma en el México virreinal, 1951
- El doctor Francisco Castillo Nájera, 1954
- Historia de la cultura en México, el mundo prehispánico, 1957
- Literatura mexicana del siglo XIX
