= Jacinto Canek =

Mayan revolutionary

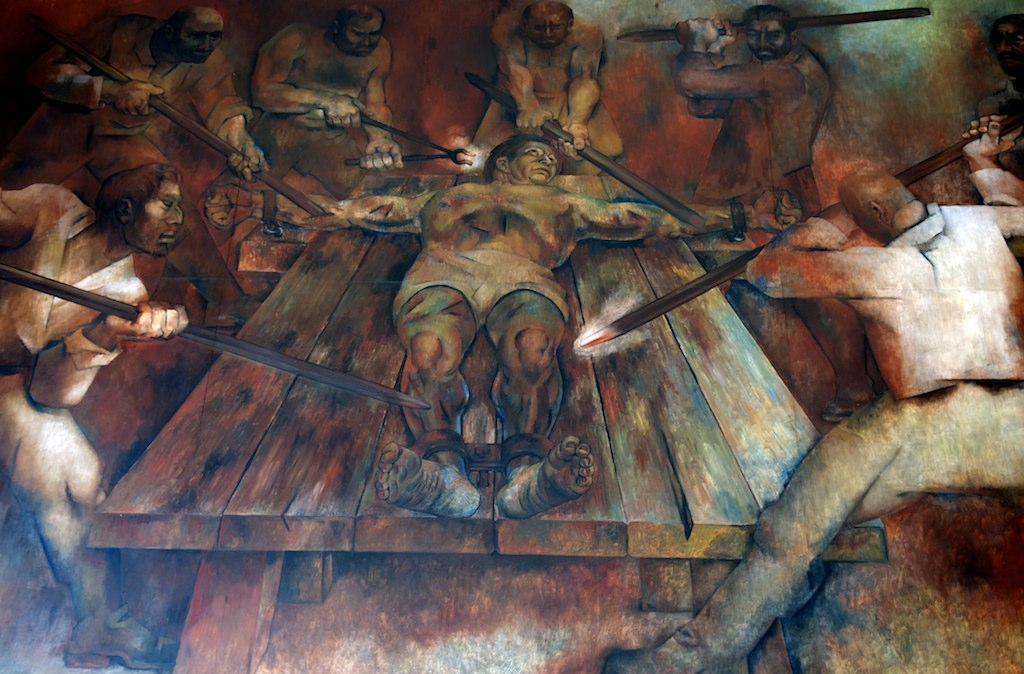
- Mural of Canek's execution, by Fernando Castro Pacheco, in the Hall of History, in the Yucatan Governor's Palace
- Born: Jacinto Uc de los Santos c. 1731; City of Campeche, Captaincy General of Yucatán, New Spain
- Died: December 14, 1761 (aged 30); Mérida, Captaincy General of Yucatán, New Spain
- Cause of death: Torture
- Other names: Jacinto, Jacinto Uc de los Santos, José de los Santos
- Occupations: Maya Mexican revolutionary and rebel leader

Jacinto Canek or Jacinto Uc de los Santos (c. 1731 in barrio de San Román, City of Campeche, New Spain – December 14, 1761 in Mérida, New Spain), was an 18th-century Maya Mexican revolutionary who fought against the Spanish in the Yucatán Peninsula of New Spain.

== The setting ==
The Spanish conquest of Yucatán ended in the late 17th century, with the fall of the Itza people, the last group of Mayas able to resist the conquistadors. However, the Mayas continued armed revolt against the Spanish into the 18th century, and after an interruption, into the early 20th century under Mexican jurisdiction and continue at the turn of the 21st century as the Zapatista Army of National Liberation in Chiapas.

Lands owned in common by the Mayans were taken and given as land grants in the form of haciendas to either the Catholic Church or to Spanish noblemen, interfering with the means of subsistence of the Maya. The Maya population was forced to work as slave labor for the conquering Spanish, while all traces of their cultural world, particularly temples and writings, were systematically destroyed by the Spanish. The Itza kingdom was the last independent Maya state, submitting to the Spanish in Guatemala only in 1697.

Jacinto Canek was born during the 18th century, just over thirty years after the Yucatán Peninsula fell to complete Spanish political control, with the conquest of the Itzas. Canek was born Jacinto Uc, but apparently adopted Canek to show a relation to past kings of the Itzas with that name. He studied Latin and history in the Franciscan monastery Convento Grande in Mérida, but was expelled for his rebellious spirit. For a number of years he worked as a baker. Historians believe that his upbringing, education, and subsequent ouster by the Franciscans contributed to Canek's bitterness toward colonial rule and the Roman Catholic church, as well as his identification with the Maya.

== The revolt ==
Canek arrived in Cisteil, a village near Sotuta and 24 leagues from Mérida, on November 3 or 4, 1761. On November 8 he had an argument with the parish priest from Tixcacaltuyub, who was in Cisteil to say mass. Canek threatened to kill the priest, and the priest complained to the authorities. The following day, while the priest was saying mass, Canek raised a false alarm of fire, apparently to empty the church so that he could kill the priest. The priest, however, was not killed.

By November 12, Canek had been accepted as a leader by almost the entire population of Cisteil. According to a subsequent declaration of Luís Cauich, one resident of the town who did not accept Canek, and who later aided the Spanish authorities, the population kissed Canek's hands and feet as a sign of obedience.

On November 19 or November 20, 1761, after a religious ceremony in the church, Canek spoke to the assembly in Maya:

My beloved children, I do not know what you await to shake off the heavy yoke and laborious servitude in which the subjugation of the Spanish has placed you. I have traveled through all of the province and have inspected all of the villages and, considering carefully the usefulness the Spanish subjugation has brought to us, I have not found a single thing but painful and inexorable servitude.... The demand for tribute is not appeased by the poverty that locks up our comrades as in a jail, nor is the thirst for our blood satisfied by the continuous whippings that bite and tear our bodies to pieces.

On November 19, Diego Pacheco, a Spanish merchant, arrived in Cisteil intending to collect some debts. He knew nothing about the changed situation there. When Canek learned of Pacheco's arrival, he brought together the chief men of the village, and they went to the tavern where Pacheco was staying. They were armed with three rifles and some spears. After a short dialog between Canek and Pacheco, the merchant was killed.

On that same day Canek was crowned king by his followers. His followers went to the church and removed the statues of the Virgin of Guadalupe, along with other sacred objects. These items were brought to Canek, and he was crowned with the Virgin's crown and given a mantle and scepter. To inspire loyalty among his followers, Canek told them that he had been given magical powers and the aid of five brujos (medicine men). This ceremony accomplished its aims of endowing the newly crowned king with both royal and supernatural status among his people, attracting even more followers.

== The suppression ==
On November 20, 1761, Captain Tiburcio Cosgaya arrived at Cisteil intending to put down the rebellion. The Indians were expecting him. In the skirmish that followed, Captain Cosgaya, five of his soldiers and eight Indians were killed. Canek told his followers that the ultimate victory of the Mayas was already written in Chilam Balam manuscripts.

The governor of Yucatán sent dispatches calling up militias, and ordering Indians throughout the province to be disarmed.

A major force under the command of Estanislao del Puerto and Cristóbal Calderón was sent out to surround the village to prevent reinforcements for Canek and his followers. The rebels were meanwhile preparing their defenses and attempting to expand the rebellion to nearby villages.

The Spanish force of 500 soldiers met Canek and his cohorts on November 26, 1761 in the plaza of Cisteil, where 1500 Maya were arrayed in two entrenched lines. In hand-to-hand fighting, the better-armed Spanish triumphed. The village was burned, and 500 Indians were said to have perished in the blaze, including eight priests or leaders of the rebellion.

Canek himself escaped with a small guard, fleeing to Huntulchac. There he assembled a force of about 300 men who had also escaped from Cisteil. But Canek and about 125 followers were then apprehended at Sibac. Canek was condemned to death, to be "tortured, his body broken, and thereafter burned and the ashes scattered to the wind."

== The aftermath ==
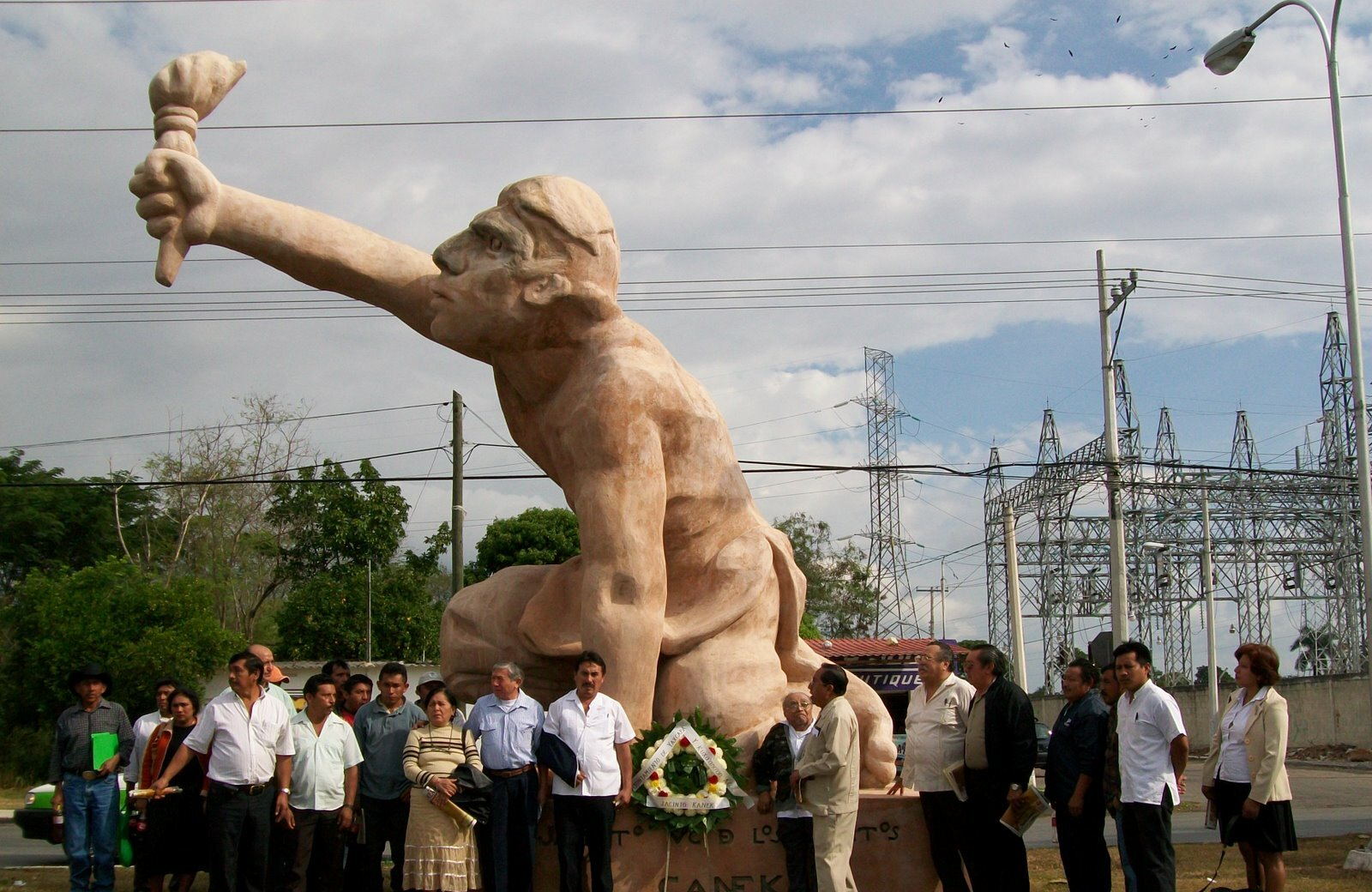
Monument to Canek in Merida

The sentence was carried out in the main plaza of Mérida on December 14, 1761, less than a month after the uprising began. Eight confederates were hanged. On the following days sentences of 200 lashes and mutilation (loss of an ear) were carried out against 200 other participants.

José Crespo y Honorato, governor of Yucatán at the time, attributed the rebellion primarily to the Spanish allowing the Maya Indians of the region to own firearms for hunting. This was considered necessary because the Maya lands were agriculturally poor, and huge areas had been confiscated by the Spanish, leaving the Maya on the verge of starvation. In addition, arming the population of the Yucatán was not considered as risky as allowing firearms to Indians elsewhere in New Spain because of the recent peaceful history of the Maya. The governor also considered that failed conversion of the Mayas to Roman Catholicism along with leniency towards Maya culture contributed to the rebellion. Crespo thought cultural celebrations were a danger to future peace in the region because they preserved the memory of ancient rites of the Maya religion. He also believed that the rebellion against "God and king" was not spontaneous, but had been plotted for more than a year.

In 1847 when rebellion again broke out (the Caste War), Jacinto Canek's name was a rallying cry. This time the Maya were well organized and determined to drive the Spanish and Mestizos, their mixed-blood descendants, into the sea. For two years they pushed toward Mérida, taking town after town, finally laying siege to the capital itself. This rebellion continued until the early 20th century. Maya rebellions at the turn of the 21st century continue in Chiapas.

== See also ==
- Ermilo Abreu Gómez
- Joaquín de Montserrat, marqués de Cruillas

== Notes ==
- (in Spanish) Ancona, Eligio, Historia de Yucatán.
- (in Spanish) Barral Gómez, Ángel, Rebeliones indígenas en la América española. Madrid, MAPFRE, 1992.
- (in Spanish) Bracamone y Sosa, Pedro, La encarnación de la profecía Canes en Cisteil. Mexico City: CIESAS, 2004.
- (in Spanish) "Canek, Jacinto", Enciclopedia de México, v. 3. Mexico City, 1996, ISBN 1564090167.
- (in Spanish) Casarrubias, Vicente, Rebeliones indígenas en la Nueva España, 1945.
- (in Spanish) Informe del gobernador José Crespo al virrey de Nueva España sobre la rebelión en Cisteil y sentencia de Jacinto Canek. Mérida, January 16, 1762
- (in Spanish) Reifler Bricker, Victoria, El cristo indígena, el rey nativo. Mexico City, FCE, 1981.
- Ermilo Abreu Gómez: Canek. 1940; in English: Canek. History and legend of a Maya hero.; transl. & introd. by Mario L. Dávila, Carter Wilson. University of California Press, Berkeley 1979 (cf. Google books)
