= Enrique González Rojo Jr. =

Mexican writer and philosopher (1928–2021)

Enrique González Rojo
- Born: Enrique González Arthur; October 5, 1928; Mexico City, Mexico
- Died: March 5, 2021 (aged 92)
- Occupations: writer, philosopher and teacher
- Website: www.enriquegonzalezrojo.com, literatura.inba.gob.mx/estado-de-mexico/4259-gonzalez-rojo-arthur-enrique.html

Enrique González Rojo (October 5, 1928 – March 5, 2021) was a Mexican writer, philosopher and teacher.

== Biography ==
González Rojo was the only son of the writer Enrique González Rojo. After the death of his father, he grew up at his grandfather Enrique González Martínez, and the family decided, that the name of his father should not get lost. In 1959, he obtained the teacher's degree and a doctorate in philosophy. He taught at the Faculty of Philosophy and Literature of the Universidad Nacional Autónoma de México and at Universidad Autónoma Metropolitana, as well as the Universidad Michoacana de San Nicolás de Hidalgo and the Universidad Autónoma de Chapingo.

He was affiliated with the Mexican Communist Party and later became a theoretician of Spartacism. He was a member of the group Espartaquismo Integral–Revolución Artículada (EIRA), and was the founder of the “Rubén Darío Society” and, subsequently, of the Nuevo Ateneo de la Juventud.

In 2008, González Rojo was honored on the occasion of his eightieth birthday in a nationwide tribute organized by Verso Destierro publishing house, in coordination with the Municipality of Ecatepec and the Instituto Nacional de Bellas Artes of Mexico. The following year, González Rojo wrote the introductory prologue to the anthology 40 Warships, published by the same press.

== Selected works ==
- Para deletrear el infinito I, 1972
- Para leer a Althusser, 1974
- El quíntuple balar de mis sentidos, 1976
- Teoría científica de la historia, 1977
- La Revolución proletario-intellectual, 1981
- Por los siglos de los siglos, 1981
- Para deletrear el infinito II, 1985
- Epistemología y socialismo, 1986-1988 (six volumes)
- Para deletrear el Infinito III, 1988
- Las huestes de Heráclito, 1988
- Apolo musageta, 1989
- El Junco, 2000
- La cantata del árbol que camina, 2000
- Memoralia del sol, 2002
- Viejos, 2002

== Awards ==
- Xavier Villaurrutia Award, 1976 for El quíntuple balar de mis sentidos
- Premio Latinoamericano de Poesía y Cuento “Benemérito de América”, 2002, for Viejos
