= Celestino Gorostiza =

Mexican film director (1904–1967)

Celestino Gorostiza Alcalá (born January 31, 1904, in Villahermosa – January 11, 1967, in Mexico City) was a Mexican theater and cine playwright, director and dramatist.

== Biography ==
Gorostiza, son of Celestino Gorostiza and Elvira Alcalá de Gorostiza, was the younger brother of José Gorostiza. He was co-founder of the Ulises theater (1927-1928) and of the Orientación theater (1932), both in Mexico City Gorostiza was married to Araceli Otero Mena, older sister of Clementina Otero. Araceli gave birth to their daughter Paloma Gorostiza Otero.

He was a numbered member of the Academia Mexicana de la Lengua and a member of the Academia Mexicana de Artes y Ciencias Cinematográficas, as well as director of the department of theater at the Instituto Nacional de Bellas Artes. Due to his 100th birthday in 2004, a 7 Mex$ memorial stamp was launched.

== Filmography ==
=== Director ===
- Ave de paso (1948)
- Sinfonía de una vida (1946; English title Symphony of Life)
- Nana (1944; together with Roberto Gavaldón)

=== Writer ===
- Paraíso robado (dialogue, adaptation; 1951; English title: Stolen Paradise)
- My General's Women (1951) (; based on the story "La soldadera", written together with Joselito Rodríguez)
- Ave de paso (1948; together with Max Aub and María Gesa)
- Sinfonía de una vida (1946; together with Max Aub, María Gesa and Pablo González)
- Nana (dialogue; 1944)
- La guerra de los pasteles (story; 1944; English title: War of the Pastries)
- Refugiados en Madrid (dialogue; 1938; English title: Refugees in Madrid)

=== Production supervisor ===
- Vámonos con Pancho Villa (1936; American title: Let's Go with Pancho Villa; English title: Let's Join Pancho Villa)

== Theater works ==
- La Malinche, 1958 (historical drama)
- La leña está verde, 1958
- Columna social, 1953
- El color de nuestra piel, 1952 (three-act play)
- La mujer ideal, 1943
- La reina de la nieve, 1942
- Escombros del sueño, 1938
- El nuevo paraíso, 1930
- Ser o no ser, 1934
- La escuela del amor, 1933

== Awards ==
- Premio Ruiz de Alarcón, for El color de nuestra piel, 1952

== Literature ==
- Celestino Gorostiza - una vida para el teatro (Spanish), Instituto Nacional de Bellas Artes, Mexico City, 2004 OCLC 57749411
- Celestino Gorostiza (1904–1967)- Teatro completo (Spanish), 2004 ISBN 968-5422-70-2
