= La estatua de sal =

Autobiographical work of Mexican writer Salvador Novo

- Author: Salvador Novo
- Language: Spanish
- Genre: Autobiography
- Publisher: Fondo de Cultura Económica
- Publication date: 1998
- Publication place: Mexico

La estatua de sal (English: The Salt Statue) is an autobiographical work by Mexican writer Salvador Novo, written around 1945–1946 and published posthumously in 1998. It is an account of personal memories, the author's sexual experiences, and gay life in Mexico City in the 1910s and 1920s.

Mexican author and gay rights activist Carlos Monsiváis points out that there was no precedent for this work in Latin America and it is the first gay, autobiographical text in Mexico.

== History ==
Novo's diary-style memoirs collected in La vida en México en el periodo presidencial de Adolfo Ruiz Cortines contain for the first brief reference to La estatua de sal in a 1953 entry where the writer makes some mention of an autobiographical work that had been interrupted six years before, which places the origin of the work around halfway through the 1940s. Later on, in an entry from June 26, 1954, he mentions these memoirs by title as part of some stored, on-hold documents housed in the garden study at his house in Coyoacán:

How many folders, how many envelopes, how many frozen, stopped, suspended papers! An interrupted poem, the sketch of a story, a half-finished translation—and the first seventy-eight pages of these memoirs—"La estatua de sal"—which I was writing feverishly when around seven years ago Carlos Chávez came over one afternoon[...]

The manuscript was delivered to the editor Guillermo Rousset Banda, who had previously edited Novo's poetry anthologies, however, for 20 years, nothing came of it. After Novo's death in 1974, his documents, along with his copyright, passed to his nephew and heir Antonio Lopez, who did not make any effort to bring the complete work to light.

Meanwhile, small sections of the text were circulating in various publications. In Spanish, some excerpts under the title Memorias (English: "Memoirs") were published in Política Sexual: Cuadernos del Frente Homosexual de Acción Revolucionaria ("Sexual Politics: Dispatches from the Homosexual Front for Revolutionary Action") in 1979 and in Nuestro cuerpo ("Our Body") in 1980. Gay Sunshine Press published an except of a fragment titled "Memoir" in English as part of the anthology Now the Volcano. An anthology of Latin American Gay Literature in 1979.

Ultimately, the complete text was not published until 1996 when Guillermo Rousset Banda delivered the manuscript to the General Publications Office for the Secretariat of Culture, formerly known as CONCULTA, so that they could include it in a series of Mexican memoirs. The same year, the secretariat had begun to publish Novo's diaries in the collection La vida en México ("Life in Mexico").

Therefore, the first edition of La estatua de sal was published in 1998, funded by CONCULTA, and included a foreword by Carlos Monsiváis who commented that this edition was a milestone in homosexual visibility in Mexico, stating:

Having a Mexican publishing house publish this book demonstrates the profound advances in tolerance and in admitting books previously considered "unprintable" to the literary canon.

== Content ==
La estatua de sal recounts memories of Novo's youth from his birth in Mexico City and childhood in Torreón, Coahuila, through his adventures in his 20s, with particular emphasis on his sexual life and explicit descriptions of his intimate liaisons with other men. Monsivás has highlighted the influence of Freudian psycholanalysis in these memoirs.

Novo's descriptions of the gay environment in Mexico City at the beginning of the 20th century are notable. This population's sexual activities were limited to specific places and used identified codes:

Novo, without intending it, offers through his autobiography a homoerotic urbanism and provides the necessary elements to describe the codes for constructing a homosexual identity in Mexico city from 1917 to 1921.

== Bibliography ==
- Novo, Salvador (2002). La estatua de sal. Prólogo de Carlos Monsiváis. México: CONACULTA. ISBN 970-18-1347-2
- Novo, Salvador (1996). La vida en México en el periodo presidencial de Adolfo Ruiz Cortines. Tomo 1. México: CONACULTA. ISBN 968-29-8298-7
- Monsiváis, Carlos (2010). Salvador Novo. Lo marginal en el centro. Era. ISBN 978-968-411-582-8
