= Jorge Cuesta (poet) =

Mexican chemist, writer, & editor (1903–1942)

- Born: Jorge Mateo Cuesta Porte-Petit; September 23, 1903; Córdoba, Veracruz
- Died: August 13, 1942 (aged 38); Tlalpan
- Education: Universidad Nacional Autónoma de México
- Occupations: Chemist, writer, editor
- Spouse: Guadalupe Marín (married 1928–1933)
- Children: 1

Jorge Mateo Cuesta Porte-Petit (b. Córdoba, Veracruz, September 23, 1903 – d. Tlalpan, August 13, 1942) was a Mexican chemist, writer and editor.

== Biography ==
Cuesta attended school in his hometown, before he did his studies at the Faculty of Chemistry of Universidad Nacional Autónoma de México (UNAM) until 1925. In 1924 he published his first short story in a magazine. When he finished his studies, he moved back to Córdoba for a short time.

In 1927, back in Mexico City, he met his later wife Guadalupe Marín, who was married to Diego Rivera at that time. In 1928 he travelled to Europe, where he met Octavio G. Barreda, Carlos Luquín, André Breton, Carlos Pellicer, Samuel Ramos and Agustín Lazo. Back in Mexico, Marín and Cuesta married in November 9, 1928. He was co-founder of the Los Contemporáneos group. Cuesta, who worked for several magazines, founded his own magazine in 1932, named Examen. In 1930 his only son was born, Lucio Antonio Cuesta Marín. In 1933, he divorced from Marín.

Following a fit of madness that included an act of self-castration, Cuesta was hospitalized and would later hang himself using the bedsheets from the sanitarium where he was interred. He is buried in the Panteón Francés, Mexico City.

== Selected works / publications ==
- Canto a un Dios Mineral
- A Pesar del Oscuro Silencio
- La Calle del Amor
- Poeta, Funde tu Campana
- El plan contra Calles, 1934
- Poesía de Jorge Cuesta, 1942
- Crítica de la reforma del Artículo Tercero, (1943

== Translated work / publication ==
- Sonnets suivis de Chant à un dieu minéral (Sonnets followed by Chant à un dieu minéral), traduits par Annick Allaigre-Duny, fédérop, 2003, Pierre Mainard éditeur, 2023
