= Luis Cabrera Lobato =

Mexican politician

Luis Cabrera
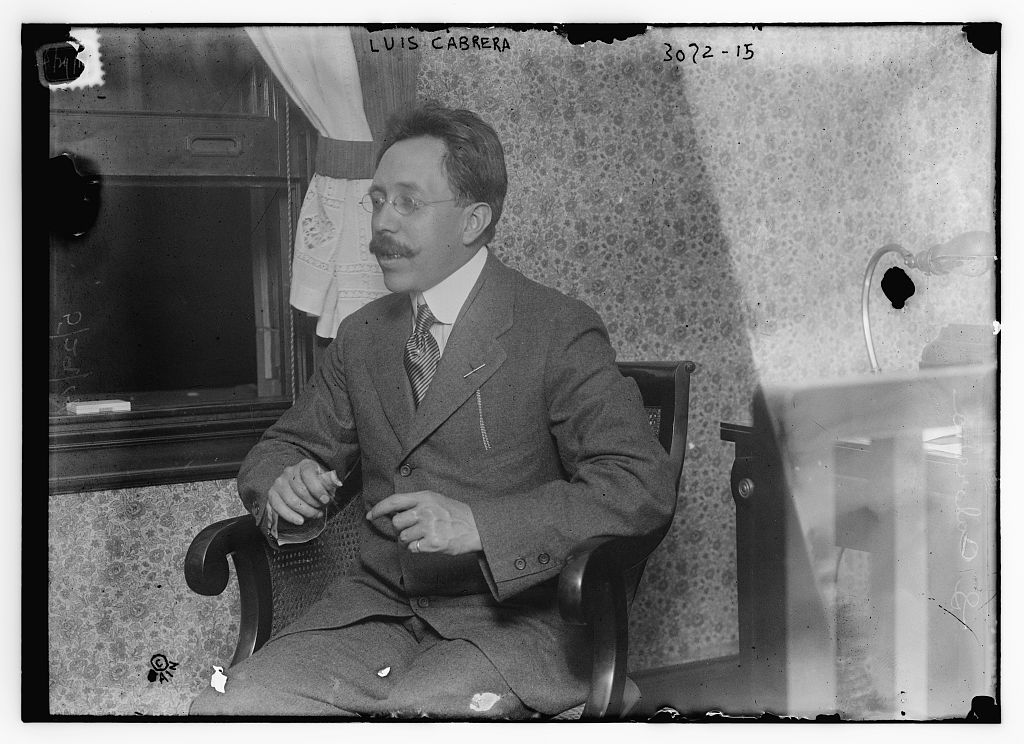
- Cabrera in 1914

Deputy of the Congress of the Union for the 14th district of Puebla
- In office 13 July 1917 – 31 August 1918
- Succeeded by: Constantino Molina

Personal details
- Born: Luis Vicente Cabrera Lobato; 17 July 1876 Zacatlán, Puebla
- Died: 12 April 1954 (aged 77) Mexico City
- Spouse: Guillermina Nevraumont (1884–1968) / Elena Cosío
- Children: María Luisa Inés/ José/ Guillermo / Mercedes / Jorge / Luis / Enrique / Daniel / Ramón
- Relatives: Daniel Cabrera
- Education: Lawyer
- Alma mater: Escuela Nacional de Jurisprudencia (National School of Jurisprudence)
- Occupation: Lawyer, politician, writer
- Writing career
- Pen name: Lucas Rivera, Lic. Blas Urrea
- Genres: Essays, poetry, professional literature, translations

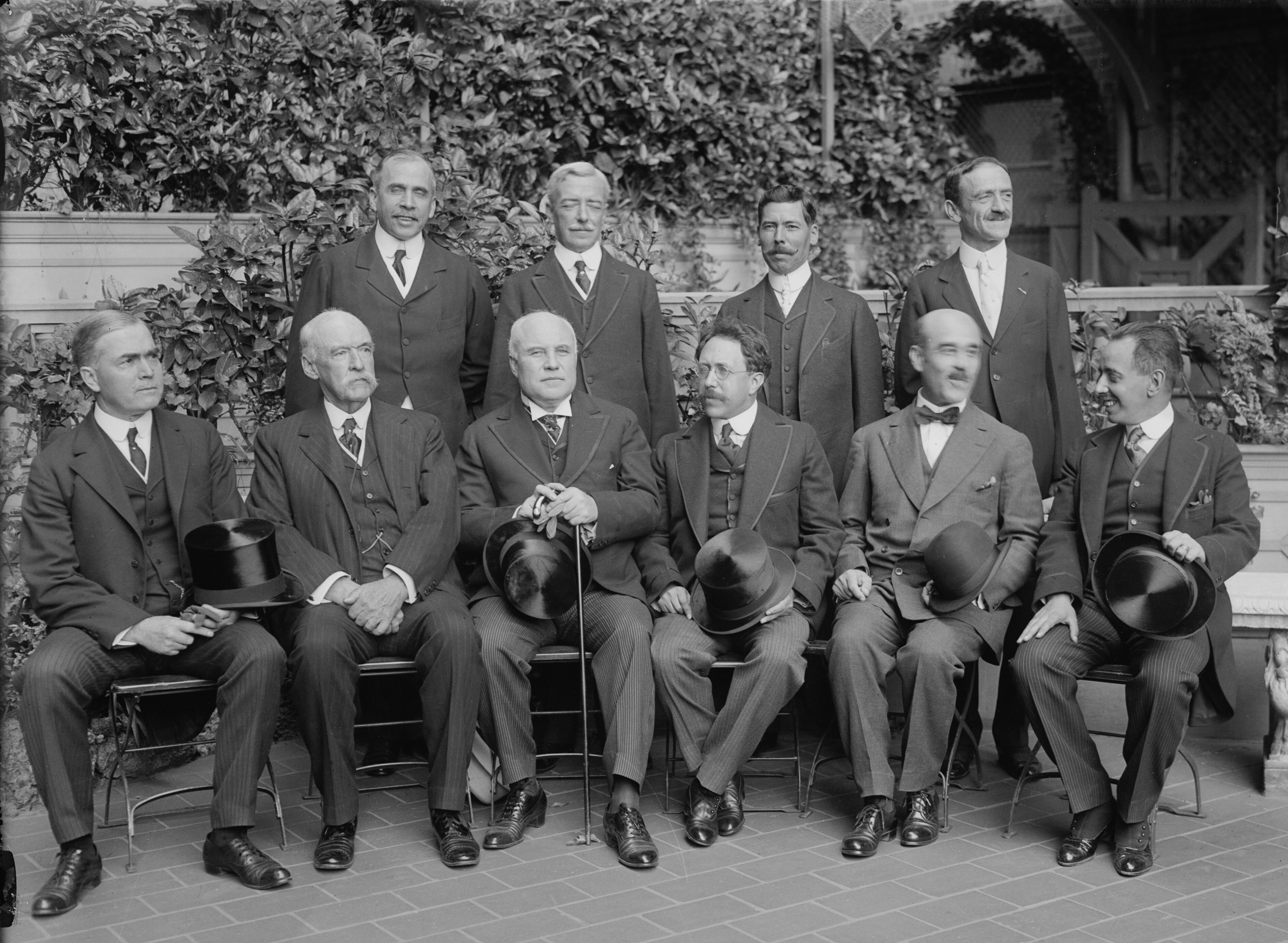
The United States–Mexico Commission. Standing from left to right are: Stephen Bonsal, Attache of the State Department and Advisor to the American Commission; American Secretary of State Robert Lansing; Eliseo Arredondo, the Mexican ambassador designate, and Leo Stanton Rowe, the Secretary to the American Commission. Sitting from left to right are John Mott of New York City; Judge George Gray of Wilmington, Delaware; Secretary of the Interior Franklin Knight Lane; Luis Cabrera Lobato, chairman of the Mexican delegation and Secretary of the Treasury of Mexico; Alberto J. Pani, President of the National Railways of Mexico; and Ignacio Bonillas, Minister of Communications and Public Works.. The image was taken at the Biltmore Hotel in New York City on 9 September 1916.

Luis Vicente Cabrera Lobato (17 July 1876 – 12 April 1954) was a Mexican lawyer, politician and writer. His pen name for his political essays was Lic. Blas Urrea; his more literary works appeared under the name of Lucas Rivera. During the late presidency of Porfirio Díaz, he was a vocal critic of the regime. He became an important civilian intellectual in the Mexican Revolution (1910–1920).

He was a co-founder of the Anti-Re-electionist Party, which backed the candidacy of Francisco I. Madero, and when armed revolutionaries forced Díaz to resign, he counseled Madero not to make a deal with the old regime. During the Madero administration, he drafted a reform land law, which Madero did not sign. After Madero's murder in the February 1913 coup d'état, Cabrera was a key civilian adviser to the Primer Jefe of the Constitutionalist Army, Venustiano Carranza. He retired from politics following Carranza's ouster and murder in 1920.

== Biography ==
Cabrera was born in Zacatlán, Puebla, the son of the baker Cesáreo Cabrera Ricaño and Gertrudis Lobato; an uncle, Daniel Cabrera Rivera (1858-1914), was a journalist and head of the anti-Díaz publication El Hijo del Ahuizote and was the older brother of the physician and governor of Puebla (1917–1920) Alfonso Cabrera. Luis married Guillermina Nevraumont and was later married to Elena Cosío.

Cabrera was assistant teacher at the Tecomaluca school in Tlaxcala for a while, before he continued his studies and worked for El Hijo del Ahuizote. In May 1901 he achieved his licenciado degree. Afterwards he was a partner in a law firm with Rodolfo Reyes, son of General Bernardo Reyes, and Andrés Molina Enríquez. Additionally he wrote for several journals. In July 1909 he became a co-founded of the Anti-Re-electionist Party, started a critical campaign against the científico group of Positivist advisers of Porfirio Díaz. In his articles he also supported the campaign against Porfirio Díaz, who had initially said he would not run in the 1910 elections and then reneged.

Both he and Molina Enríquez were supporters of Bernardo Reyes to succeed Díaz in 1910, but Reyes declined to run and was sent on a military mission to Europe. Cabrera then joined in support of Francisco I. Madero and the Anti-Reelectionist Party. During the interim presidency of Francisco León de la Barra, who assumed the presidency after Díaz's ouster and exile and before the election of Madero to the presidency, Cabrera was offered a government post, which he declined in favor of running for the post of federal deputy. Following Madero's election to the presidency, Cabrera was rejected by the president's advisers for the position of secretary of development, and he then served as a deputy for the Federal District. In 1912 he became director of the Escuela Nacional de Jurisprudencia (today Faculty of Law of the UNAM) and deputy to the Congress. He was re-elected to Congress, for Puebla's 14th district, in the 1917 general election.

Following Madero's assassination in February 1913 during General Victoriano Huerta's coup d'état and then restoration of Porfirian policies, Cabrera joined the Constitutionalist faction headed by Venustiano Carranza. Cabrera was "one of the 'First Chief's' principal aides, often credited for being the intellectual behind and theorist of Carrancismo".

Under Venustiano Carranza he was responsible for the Finance and Public Credit branch from 1914 to 1917, and was Secretary of Finance and Public Credit from 1919 to 1920. Under the presidency of Venustiano Carranza, Luis Cabrera served also as Constitutionalist delegate to the Niagara Falls peace conference, where the recognition of Carranza as Mexico's president by the U.S. government and the drawback of the U.S. troops from Veracruz were discussed. As a political opponent of Pascual Ortiz Rubio, he was deported to Guatemala in 1931, but he returned after a short time. In 1933, Luis Cabrera declined the candidacy for president, which was offered him by the Anti-Re-electionist Party. The candidacy was offered him a second time by the National Action Party (PAN) in 1946, but he declined it again. After 1950 he had his own lawyer's office and became adviser of president Adolfo Ruiz Cortines.

== Death and legacy ==
Cabrera died in Mexico City. A library in Zacatlán, a street, and a plaza in the Colonia Roma of Mexico City are named in his honor.

== Works ==
Cabrera wrote for several newspapers, and predominantly translated foreign works into Spanish, but was also author of own works.

Essays

- Las manzanas de Zacatlán, 1940
- El matrimonio, 1951

Poetry

- Musa peregrina (includes versions of other poets), 1921

Collected works

- Obra jurídica, 1972
- Obra literaria, 1974
- Obra política, 1975

Government offices
Preceded by Rafael Nieto	Secretary of Finance and Public Credit; 1919–1920	Succeeded by Salvador Alvarado Rubio
