= Ramón López Velarde =

Mexican poet (1888–1921)

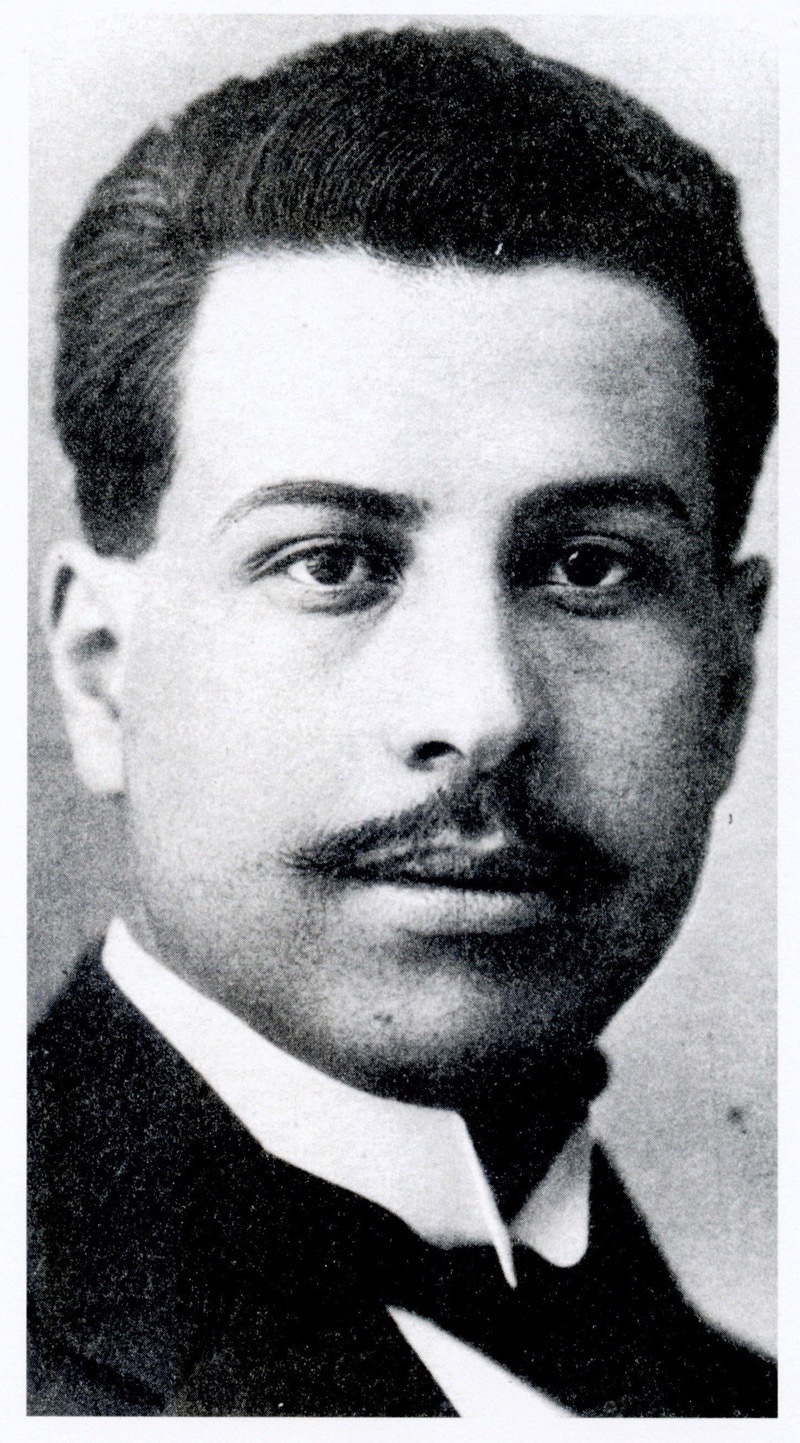
Ramón López Velarde in 1918

Ramón López Velarde (June 15, 1888 – June 19, 1921) was a Mexican poet. His work was a reaction against French-influenced modernismo which, as an expression of a purely Mexican subject matter and emotional experience, is unique. He achieved great fame in his native land, to the point of being considered Mexico's national poet.

== Biography ==
=== Formative years ===
López Velarde was born in Jerez de García Salinas, Zacatecas. He was the first of nine children of José Guadalupe López Velarde, a lawyer from Jalisco, and Trinidad Berumen Llamas, who came from a local landowning family. José, after an unsuccessful law career, had founded a Catholic school in Jerez. In 1900, Ramón was sent to a seminary in Zacatecas, where he remained for two years; later, when his family moved, he transferred to a seminary in Aguascalientes. In 1905 he abandoned the seminary in favor of a career in the law.

During his years in the seminary, Velarde had spent his holidays in Jerez. During one of these trips, he met Josefa de los Ríos, a distant relative eight years his senior, who made a deep impression on him. The earliest poem ascribed to Velarde, "Fuensanta" (1905) is believed to have been inspired by her.

In 1906 he collaborated on the literary review Bohemio, published in Aguascalientes by some of his friends, under the pseudonym of "Ricardo Wencer Olivares". The Bohemio group sided with Manuel Caballero, a Catholic Integralist opposed to literary modernism, during the controversy surrounding the 1907 reappearance of the polemical Revista Azul. However, their intervention had no appreciable effect on Mexican literary culture.

In January 1908 Velarde began his law studies at the University of San Luis Potosí. Soon after, his father died, leaving the family, which had returned to Jerez, in a desperate financial situation. Thanks to the support of his maternal uncles, Velarde was able to continue his studies. He continued to collaborate on various publications in Aguascalientes (El Observador, El Debate, Nosotros) and later in Guadalajara (El Regional, Pluma y Lápiz). Bohemia had ceased to exist by 1907.

In San Luis Potosí Velarde read modernist poetry, especially that of Amado Nervo, to whom he will refer as "our greatest poet", and Andrés González Blanco. This radically changed his aesthetic sensibilities, transforming him into a fervent defender of modernism. In 1910 he began to write what would later become La sangre devota.

=== The Revolution ===
During the years of the Mexican Revolution, López Velarde openly supported the political reforms of Francisco Madero, whom he met personally in 1910. In 1911 he received his law degree and became a judge in the small town of Venado. However, he left his position at the end of the year and traveled to Mexico City, hoping that Madero, the new president of the republic, might offer him a position in his government. Madero made no such offer, perhaps because of Velarde's militant Catholicism.

Eduardo J. Correa, his old mentor, hired him in 1912 to collaborate on La Nación, a monthly Catholic journal in Mexico City. Velarde wrote poems, reviews, and political commentary about Mexico's new state of affairs. He attacked, among others, Emiliano Zapata. He left the journal soon after the revolt of February 9, 1913, which brought Victoriano Huerta to power. Trying to escape the political turmoil of Mexico City, he returned to San Luis Potosí. He began his courtship of María de Nevares, which he would continue for the rest of his life, unsuccessfully.

At the beginning of 1914 he settled permanently in Mexico City. In the middle of 1915 the rise to power of Venustiano Carranza began a period of relative tranquility. Mexican poetry was currently dominated by the postmodernism of Enrique González Martínez, for whom Velarde had little admiration. He preferred the work of José Juan Tablada, who was also his good friend. During this period he was also interested in the work of the Argentine modernist Leopoldo Lugones, who left a decisive influence on Velarde's later work.

=== Nostalgia ===
In 1915 López Velarde began to write more personal poems, marked by their nostalgia for his native Jerez (to which he would never return), and for his first love, "Fuensanta".

In 1916 he published his first book, La sangre devota (The Pious Blood), which he dedicated to "the spirits" of the Mexican poets Manuel Gutiérrez Nájera and Manuel José Othón, and was well received by the Mexican literary community. The book – and even its title – concerned the Catholic liturgy, which was associated with the idealized world of the author's childhood in Jerez, and identified as the only refuge from his turbulent city life. The poem "Viaje al terruño" is fundamentally an attempt to evoke a return to childhood. Nevertheless, this nostalgia is not free of a certain ironic distance, as in the poem "Tenías un rebozo de seda..." he remembers himself as a "seminarian, without Baudelaire, without rhyme, and without a sense of smell".

In 1917, Josefa de los Ríos, the inspiration for "Fuensanta", died. Velarde began to work on his next book, Zozobra (Sinking), which would not be published for another two years. Between March and July of that year he collaborated with González Martínez on the review Pegaso. Despite receiving increasing criticism for his Catholicism and provincialism, Velarde's literary prestige also began to rise.

=== Zozobra ===
In 1919 Velarde published Zozobra, considered by the majority of critics to be his major work. It was heavily ironic and drew both from his provincial upbringing and his recent experiences in the city. The influence of Lugones was evident in the book's tendency to avoid common settings, the employment of vocabulary then considered unpoetical, of unusual adjectives and unexpected metaphors, the use of word games, the frequency of proparoxytones, and the humorous use of rhyme. In this sense, the work also resembled that of the Uruguayan poet Julio Herrera y Reissig. Zozobra consists of forty poems arranged cyclically, begun by the line "Hoy como nunca" ("Today as never"), saying goodbye to Fuensanta and Jerez, and ending with the poem "Humildemente" ("Humbly"), which marks a symbolic return to his origins. Zozobra was strongly criticized by González Martínez.

In 1920 the revolt of Alvaro Obregón brought an end to the government of Carranza, which for Velarde had been a period of stability and great productivity. But after a brief period of unrest in Velarde's life, José Vasconcelos was named minister of education, and promised a cultural renovation of the country. Velarde wrote for two journals promoted by Vasconcelos, México Moderno and El Maestro. In the latter, Velarde published one of his best-known essays, "Novedad de la Patria", where he expounded on the ideas of his earlier poems. Also appearing in El Maestro was "La suave patria", which would cement Velarde's reputation as Mexico's national poet.

Velarde died on June 19, 1921, soon after turning thirty-three. His death was officially attributed to pneumonia, although it was speculated that syphilis might have been to blame. He left behind an unfinished book, El son del corazón ("The sound of the heart"), which would not be published until 1932.

== His influence ==
After his death, at Vasconcelos' quiet urging, López Velarde was given great honors, and held up as the national poet. His work, especially "La suave patria", was presented as the ultimate expression of post-revolutionary Mexican culture. This official appropriation did not preclude others from championing his work. The poets known as the Contemporáneos saw Velarde, together with Tablada, as the beginning of modern Mexican poetry. Xavier Villaurrutia, in particular, insisted on the centrality of Velarde in the history of Mexican poetry, and compared him to Charles Baudelaire.

The first complete study of Velarde was made by American author Allen W. Phillips in 1961. This formed the basis for a subsequent study by Octavio Paz, included in his book Cuadrivio (1963), in which he argued the modernity of López Velarde, comparing him to Jules Laforgue, Leopoldo Lugones and Julio Herrera.

Other critics, such as Gabriel Zaid, centered their analysis on Velarde's formative years and his strong Catholicism. On 1989, on Velarde's one hundredth birthday, Mexican author Guillermo Sheridan published a new biography of the poet, titled Un corazón adicto: la vida de Ramón López Velarde, which remains the most complete biography of Velarde to date.

Velarde's oeuvre marks a moment of transition between modernism and the avant-garde. His work was marked by a novel approach to poetic language. At the same time, it was framed by duality, whether it be the Mexican struggle between rural traditions and the new culture of the cities, or his own struggle between asceticism and pagan sensuality.

Despite his importance, he remains virtually unknown outside his own country.

== Works of Ramón López Velarde ==
=== Poetry ===
- La sangre devota, 1916
- Zozobra, 1919
- El son del corazón, 1932

=== Prose ===
- El minutero, 1923
- El don de febrero y otras prosas, 1952
- Correspondencia con Eduardo J. Correa y otros escritos juveniles, 1991

== Memorials ==
- Jardín Ramón López Velarde in Colonia Roma, Mexico City

== Sources ==
- Alfonso García Morales, López Velarde, Ramón: La sangre devota / Zozobra / El son del corazón, Madrid, Hiperión, 2001.

== See also ==
- Mexican literature
- López Velarde's poem Suave patria on the Spanish Wikisource
- Ramón López Velarde 1888–1921 Published in Encyclopedia of Latin American Literature (1997)
- Photography of La Suave Patria, video of the famous poem of Ramón López Velarde 1888–1921 Published by La Guirnalda Polar, LGPublishing Society, Spanish (2020)
