= Enrique González Martínez =

Mexican poet, diplomat and doctor

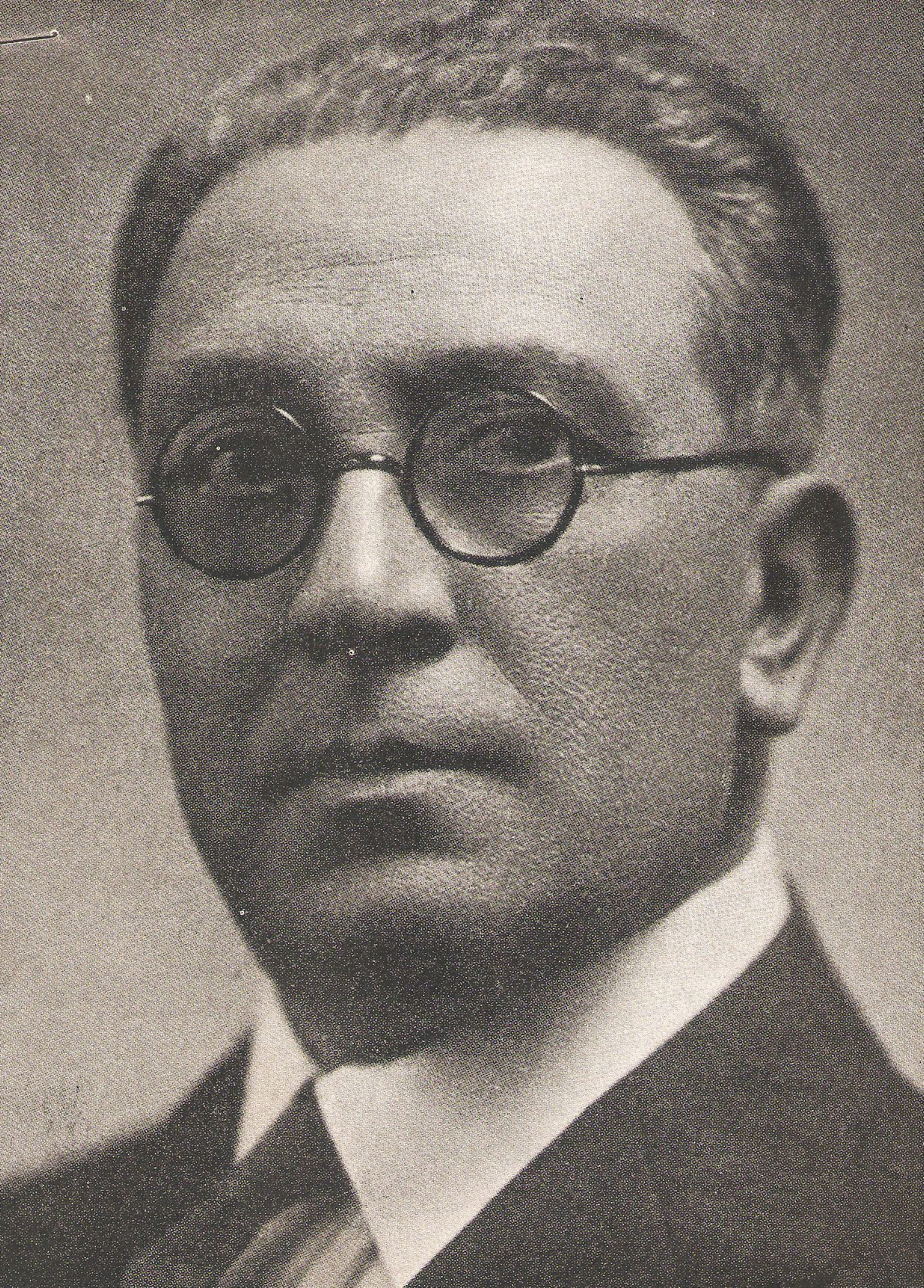
- Born: April 13, 1871; Guadalajara, Jalisco
- Died: February 19, 1952 (aged 80); Mexico City
- Occupations: poet, physician and diplomat
- Spouse: Luisa Rojo
- Children: Enrique (1899–1939), María Luisa (1901), Héctor (1903)

Enrique González Martínez (April 13, 1871 in Guadalajara, Jalisco – February 19, 1952 in Mexico City) was a Mexican poet, diplomat, surgeon and obstetrician. His poetry is considered to be primarily Modernist in nature, with elements of French symbolism.

== Life ==
Martínez received his early education at home. At the age of 10 he entered preparatory school, the Council Seminary, and the Liceo de Varones (Men's Grammar School) of the State of Jalisco.

In 1893 Martínez received his doctorate degree in Guadalajara. During that same year he published a few verses in newspapers and magazines. Soon after receiving his degree, he was named adjunct professor of physiology at the School of Medicine. After two years of professional practice, he left his native city to go to Culiacán, Sinaloa. In this state his political ambitions began to develop; he became a political prefect in various areas of the state and Secretary General of government.

In 1903 Martínez's first book of poetry, Preludios, was published. With his third book, Silenter, he was received as a member of the Mexican Academy, moving to Mexico City where he became president of the youth Ateneo (1912), founded the literary magazine Argos (1912) and edited the daily newspaper El Imparcial.

In his political ambitions he assumed the position of Undersecretary of Public Education and Fine Arts in 1913. The following year he became secretary of government of the State of Puebla; Professor of French Literature in the School of Higher Studies, head of Literature and Grammar classes, and professor of Mexican Literature in the National Preparatory School in the Federal District. In 1917, in the company of other great literary lights such as Ramon Lopez Velarde and Efrén Rebolledo, he directed Pegaso magazine.

Martínez entered the Mexican Foreign Service in 1920, occupying the position of plenipotentiary minister of Mexico in Chile, Argentina, Spain and Portugal between the years 1920 and 1931. Later he returned to Mexico.

Late in 1942, Martínez entered the Seminary of Mexican Culture, and later in 1943, to the National School where he sustained conferences on diverse subjects of literary history. He was a member of the Mexican Academy of Language and the Altamirano Grammar School. In 1944 he received the Ávila Camacho National Prize of Literature and his Poesías Completas was published.

He died in Mexico City in 1952.

== Work ==
Mexican Revolution Literature took note of Martínez's poem "Tuércele el cuello al cisne" (Wring the Neck of the Swan), written in 1910 and published 1911. In this poem he signifies his break with Modernist rhetoric by indicating his desire to replace the swan, a primordial Modernist symbol, with the owl. He was praised by author and poet Octavio Paz, who said of him, "Martínez was the only true modernist poet Mexico ever had."

== See also ==
- Statue of Enrique González Martínez
