= Los Contemporáneos =

Mexican artist group in the 1920s and 1930s

The magazine Contemporáneos was started by Jaime Torres Bodet, Bernardo J. Gastélum, Bernardo Ortiz de Montellano, and Enrique González Rojo.

Los Contemporáneos (which means "The Contemporaries" in English) can refer to a Mexican modernist group, active in the late 1920s and early 1930s, as well as to the literary magazine which served as the group's mouthpiece and artistic vehicle from 1928 to 1931. In a way, they were opposed to stridentism.

The group had its origins in friendships and literary collaborations that were formed among students attending Mexico City's elite National Preparatory School; that is where founding members José Gorostiza, Carlos Pellicer, Bernardo Ortiz de Montellano, Enrique González Rojo, and Jaime Torres Bodet met for the first time. This core group would all go on to attend together the Universidad Nacional Autónoma de México, specifically its Faculty of Jurisprudence, where they would come under the influence of professors Antonio Caso and Enrique González Martínez, both of whom were associated with the literary society Ateneo de México. Following this, a new generationally oriented and constituted society named the Nuevo Ateneo de la Juventud was formed in 1918. As a literary generation, the group was heir to modernismo, the work of Ramón López Velarde, and the tradition of the European avant garde. It was during this time that work by Los Contemporáneos began appearing in magazines and student periodicals such as Pegaso (1917) and San-Ev-Ank (1918). In 1921, Salvador Novo and Xavier Villaurrutia joined the group; Jorge Cuesta and Gilberto Owen would later enter its orbit as well. Los Contemporáneos benefited from government support during the period when José Vasconcelos was Secretary of Public Education (1920–24). Antonieta Rivas Mercado was also a member, as well as their patron.

Members of the group began writing for and collaborating in magazines and other literary venues. They also started their own publications, the first of which, México Moderno, was described as an "art and literature review" and ran from 1920 to 1923. La Falange (December 1922-February 1923), labeled a "review of Latin culture", and Ulises (May 1927–February 1928; see also Teatro Ulises), billed as a source of "curiosity and criticism", were two other short-lived, though influential, literary journals founded and directed by Contemporáneos.

In 1928, Torres Bodet inaugurated the group's longest-lived editorial endeavor, the magazine Contemporáneos. From June 1928 until December 1931 the magazine published, along with representative work by its founding members and allies, pieces by older, more established Mexican, Latin American, and Spanish writers, as well as translations of favored American and European authors. The rich and varied content of the publication was complemented by expensive details such as fine magazine paper and photographs and illustrations (made possible by continued government subventions).

In 1928, Jorge Cuesta would also publish, under the aegis of the Contemporáneos press, a poetic anthology titled Antología de la poesía mexicana moderna, which would give rise to heated polemics because of what were perceived, in certain literary and intellectual quarters, as glaring editorial omissions. Needless to say, much of the anthology's pages were taken up by the poetic output of Contemporáneos.

== Los Contemporáneos: tradition and innovation ==
The group's central ideological position can be described as one of "contemporary [hence the name] cultural universalism": they were aware of the emergence of an unprecedented universality of cultural expression and innovation (brought about by capitalism's advance and accelerating technological progress), which they sought to not simply participate in, but, through their own particular vantage point as Mexican artists, contribute to as well. As individuals and as a group they would go on to expand the horizons of Mexican poetry.

The Contemporáneos always expressed great appreciation for La Nouvelle Revue Française and its coterie of writers. They were also greatly attentive to the evolution of surrealism, and members of the group, while in Europe, made contact with leaders of the movement, including André Breton, author of the Surrealist Manifesto. The most important literary models and precursors of the Contemporáneos were: Guillaume Apollinaire, Jean Cocteau, André Gide, Marcel Proust, T. S. Eliot and Juan Ramón Jiménez; with Gide and Proust being paramount.

== Critical assessment ==
The Contemporáneos produced work which was characterized by the extensive, sometimes essentializing, use of metaphor, and complex imagery, which served to express experimental disjointments in narrative time and space meant to convey or reinforce particular philosophical or scientific concepts or concerns. At times, the Contemporáneos were accused of literary effetism and elitism, especially when compared to groups more politically vocal and nationalist, such as the estridentistas, and of giving excessive preference to the airy and philosophical over the robust, the manly, and the mundane.

== Bibliography ==
- (Spanish) Abreu Gómez, Ermilo. Contemporáneos, Las revistas de México, Mexico: Instituto Nacional de Bellas Artes, 1963.
- (Spanish) Alboukrek, Arrón. Diccionario de Escritores Hispanoamericanos, Mexico: Ediciones Larousse, 1991.
- (English) Cortés, Eladio. Dictionary of Mexican Literature, Westport, CT: Greenwood Press, 1992.
- (English) Oropesa, Salvador. The Contemporáneos Group: rewriting Mexico in the 1930s and 1940s, Austin: University of Texas Press, 2003.
- (Spanish) Sheridan, Guillermo. Los Contemporáneos ayer, México: Fondo de Cultura Económica, 2003.
- (Spanish) Madrigal Hernández, Érika. Tamayo y los Contemporáneos: El discurso de lo clásico y lo universal. Anales del Instituto de Investigationes Estéticas, México, Universidad Nacional Autónoma de México-Instituto de Investigationes Estéticas, vol. XXX, núm. 92, primavera de 2008, pp. 155–189.
- (Spanish) Hadatty Mora, Yanna. La ciudad paroxista. Prosa mexicana de vanguardia (1921–1932), México: UNAM, 2009.
