= Enrique González Rojo Sr. =

Mexican writer

Enrique González Rojo
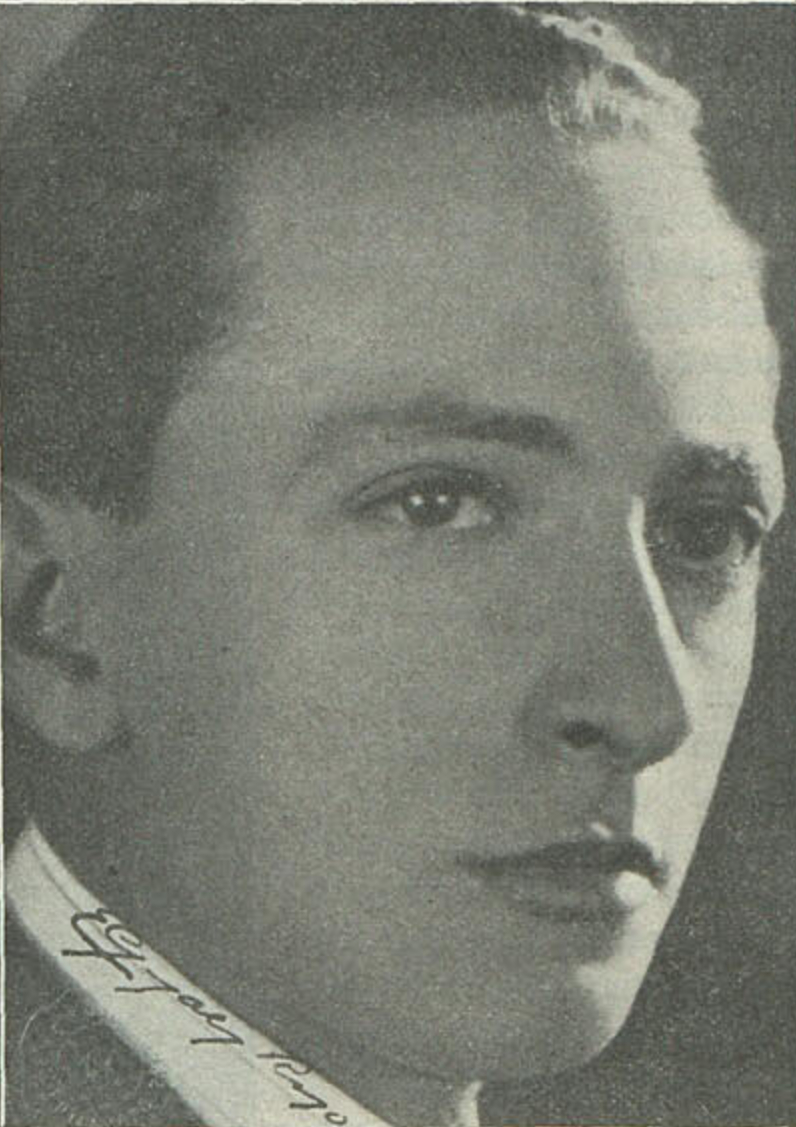
- Enrique González Rojo in 1926
- Born: August 25, 1899; Culiacán
- Died: May 9, 1939 (aged 39); Mexico City
- Children: Enrique

Enrique González Rojo (born Culiacán, 1899 – died Mexico City, May 9, 1939) was a Mexican writer.

== Biography ==
González Martínez was the son of the poet Enrique González Martínez and his wife Luisa Rojo. He had two siblings. He worked for the magazines San-Ev-Ank (1918) and the Revista Nueva (1919), was director of the literary section of the paper El Heraldo de México (1920) and was chief of the department of fine arts of the Secretaría de Educación Pública from 1923 to 1924. He was co-founder of the magazine Contemporáneos.

== Selected works / publications ==
- El puerto y otros poemas, 1923
- Espacio, 1926
- Viviendas en el mar, 1927
- Romance of José Conde, 1939
- Elegías romanas y otros poemas, 1941 (posthumously)
- Obra completa, 2002 (posthumously)
