= Xavier Villaurrutia =

Mexican poet and writer (1903–1950

Xavier Villaurrutia in an undated photograph

Xavier Villaurrutia y González (Note: In this Mexican name, the surname is Villaurrutia and the second or maternal family name is González.) (27 March 1903 – 25 December 1950) was a Mexican poet, playwright, translator, and literary critic whose most famous works are the short theatrical dramas called Autos profanos, compiled in the work Poesía y teatro completos, published in 1953. Starting in the late 1930s, Villaurrutia's work reflects his preoccupation with death. He wrote about feeling a nostalgia for death, and about invitations to death.

== Biography ==
Xavier Villaurrutia was born in Mexico City in 1903. He studied at the National Preparatory School and at the School of Jurisprudence. During that time, he felt a certain affinity to writing so he decided to dedicate his life to writing literature.

In 1928, he joined the modernist group Los Contemporáneos. In 1935, he received a scholarship from the Rockefeller Foundation to study theatre at Yale University. After returning to Mexico in 1937, he started working for a local newspaper, Letras de México. Villaurrutia later founded the first experimental theater in Mexico.

Along with Salvador Novo, he founded the magazine Ulises in 1927, in which he published the novel Dama de corazones (Lady of Hearts) in 1928.

From 1937 to 1942, Villaurrutia worked as a film critic for the magazines Hoy and Así. His collected reviews were published in 1970. As a translator, he produced Spanish versions of works by André Gide, William Blake, Anton Chekov and others.

== Notable works ==
Villaurrutia's notable works include his poetic writings, beginning with Reflejos in 1926 and Nocturnos in 1933. Villaurrutia's writing becomes darker in his later poetic works: Nostalgia de la muerte (literally meaning "Nostalgia of death") in 1938, and Décima muerte (literally "tenth death") in 1941. It is unclear if this change was due to the increased turmoil in Europe that would lead to World War II or simply due to Villaurrutia's increasing age. The preoccupation with death in Villaurrutia's work climaxed with his 1941 play, Invitación a la muerte, the title of which can be literally translated to "Invitation to the death" (see "References" below regarding Dr. Raymond Marion Watkins's book which chronicles a history and analysis of this play, which Watkins demonstrates was heavily influenced by Villaurrutia's integration of dramatic elements traceable to William Shakespeare's "Hamlet.") The final published work of Villaurrutia came posthumously in 1953 with the publication of Poesía y teatro completos, a collection of his works which included the short theatrical dramas, Autos profanos. The American writer Eliot Weinberger translated Nostalgia de la muerte to English.

== Critical analysis ==
Xavier Villaurrutia was greatly influenced by the work of Ramón López Velarde as well as by several other Mexican poets.

== Legacy ==
He has been a major influence for many poets, including Octavio Paz (who was his student) and Alí Chumacero.

Since 1955, there has been a Xavier Villaurrutia Award for literary works published in Mexico, selected by a jury of writers. This award has been sponsored by the Consejo Nacional para la Cultura y las Artes since 1991.

== Links ==
- The Columbia Electronic Encyclopedia, 6th ed.
- Christopher Ramirez (16 June 2005). "Mapping the Public Space of '(Homo)sexual' Latino Men: Essay". University of California, Santa Cruz. Archived from the original on 13 July 2007.
- For more information on Villaurrutia's "Invitación a la Muerte," see Dr. Raymond Marion Watkins's From Elsinore to Mexico City: The Pervasiveness of Shakespeare's Hamlet in Xavier Villaurrutia's Invitación à la Muerte—published in Saarbrücken, Germany, by VDM Verlag, 2008. Dr. Watkins's book also includes extensive documentation of Villaurrutia's study at Yale University's Drama School from 1935–36, the only time Villaurrutia left his native Mexico City.
