= Salvador Novo =

Mexican writer (1904–1974)

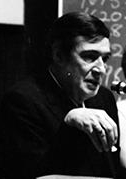
Novo in 1971

Salvador Novo López (July 30, 1904 – January 13, 1974) was a Mexican writer, poet, playwright, translator, television presenter, entrepreneur, and the official chronicler of Mexico City. As a noted intellectual, he influenced popular perceptions of politics, media, the arts, and Mexican society in general. He was a member of the Mexican modernist writers' group Los Contemporáneos, as well as of the Academia Mexicana de la Lengua.

== Life and career ==
In spite of the machismo and conservative Catholicism prevalent in 20th-century Mexico, Novo was openly homosexual. As a result, he was referred to by Luis Spota as "Nalgador Sobo", a spoonerism that roughly translates to "butt groper". This elicited a riposte from Novo, who published an epigram mocking Spota's surname. The feud reportedly culminated in a fist fight between the two writers during a performance at the Palacio de Bellas Artes, after which they were both arrested.

Nevertheless, Novo was accepted by the Mexican government, for whom he worked in official posts related to culture. He was elected to the Academia Mexicana de la Lengua and had a television program on Mexico City's history. Towards the end of his life, he dyed his hair a bright carrot color and wore many ostentatious rings and colored suits. He has been compared to Oscar Wilde, but unlike Wilde, Novo never suffered the setback of scandal or persecution and remained a respected member of high society and governmental circles until his death. In fact, some sectors resented the fact that a gay writer would align himself so closely with the government and media after the repression of social movements in the 1960s and 1970s.

The street on which he lived was renamed after him when he assumed the role of Mexico City's official chronicler, a post held for life.

== Works ==
- 1925 — XX Poemas (XX Poems)
- 1932 — El tercer Fausto
- 1933 — Nuevo amor (New Love)
- 1933 — Espejo (Mirror)
- 1934 — Seamen Rhymes
- 1934 — Romance de Angelillo y Adela (Romance of Angelillo and Adela)
- 1934 — Poemas proletarios (Proletarian Poems)
- 1934 — Never ever
- 1937 — Un poema (A Poem)
- 1938 — Poesías escogidas (Chosen Poems)
- 1944 — Nuestra tierra (Our Land)
- 1945 — Florido laude
- 1945 — La estatua de sal (The Salt Statue, published in May 2008)
- 1955 — Dieciocho sonetos (Eighteen Sonets)
- 1955 — Sátira, el libro ca… (Satire)
- 1961 — Poesía (Poetry)
- 1962 — Breve historia de Coyoacán (Short History of Coyoacán)
- 1967 — Historia gastronómica de la Ciudad de México (Gastronomic History of Mexico City)
- 1967 — Imagen de una ciudad (Image of a City) illustrated with photographs by Pedro Bayona
- 1968 — La Ciudad de México en 1867 (Mexico City in 1867)
- 1971 — Historia y leyenda de Coyoacán (History and Legend of Coyoacán)

== Theatre ==
=== Plays ===
- Don Quijote (1947)
- Astucia (Witness) (1948)
- La culta dama (1948) (The Wise Lady; it was used to write the script of a homonym Mexican film, directed in 1957 by Rogelio A. González Jr.
- A ocho columnas (Eight Columns) (from 1953 on)
- Diálogos (Dialogues)
- Yocasta o casi (Yocasta or Almost)
- Cuauhtémoc
- La guerra de las gordas (The War of the Fatties)
- Ha vuelto Ulises (Ulises Has Returned)
- El sofá (The Sofa)
- El espejo encantado (The Enchanted Mirror)

=== Building ===
Within a 1,000-sq.m.-land purchased in the late 1940s, Salvador Novo decided to build, with the aid of architect Alejandro Prieto, the cultural project "La Capilla", for which purpose he adapted an old chapel as a theatre, which was inaugurated on January 22, 1953.
