= Carlos Pellicer =

Mexican poet (1897–1977)

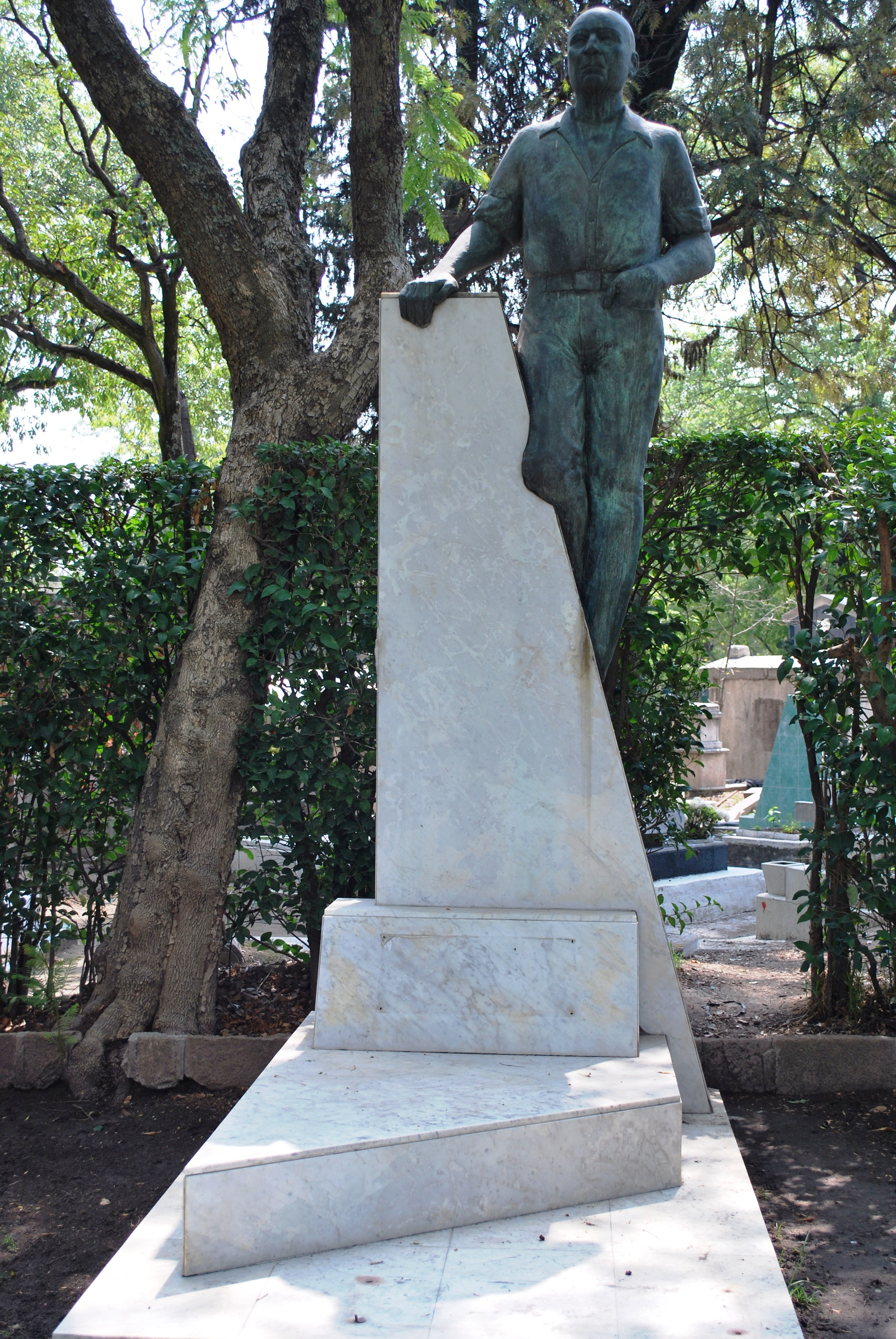
A statue of Carlos Pellicer at the Panteon Civil de Dolores cemetery in Mexico City

Carlos Pellicer Cámara (10 January 1897 – 16 February 1977) belonged to the first wave of modernist Mexican poets and was active in the promotion of Mexican art, pictures, and literature. An enthusiastic traveler, his work is filled with depictions of nature and a certain sexual energy that is shared with his contemporary Octavio Paz.

== Biography ==
Pellicer was born in Villahermosa on 10 January 1897. The young Pellicer studied in Mexico City. In August 1921, along with Vicente Lombardo Toledano, Diego Rivera, José Clemente Orozco and Xavier Guerrero, he founded the Grupo Solidario del Movimiento Obrero ("Solidarity Group of the Workers' Movement"). He lectured in modern poetry at the National Autonomous University of Mexico and served as the director of the Department of Fine Arts. He helped establish a number of museums, including the Frida Kahlo and Anahuacalli museums in Mexico City. There is a small archeology museum named for Carlos Pellicer in Tepoztlán, Morelos. In 1976 he was elected to the Senate, representing Tabasco for the PRI; at the time he invited Andrés Manuel López Obrador, who would be the president of Mexico from 2018 to 2024, to join his campaign, and López Obrador considered him as his political mentor.

His early poems, as in Colores en el mar (Colors in the Sea, 1921) and Piedra de sacrificios (Stone of Sacrifice, 1924), often depicted serene and halcyon landscapes. During his later period, however, Pellicer explored the historical and spiritual implications of his experience of nature. Octavio Paz said of his work: "A great poet, Pellicer taught to us to see the world through different eyes, and in doing so modified Mexican poetry. His work, poetry with a plurality of sorts, is solved in a luminous metaphor, an interminable praise of the world."
