= Saint-Christophe-de-Javel, Paris =

Saint-Christophe-de-Javel
- Église Saint-Christophe-de-Javel
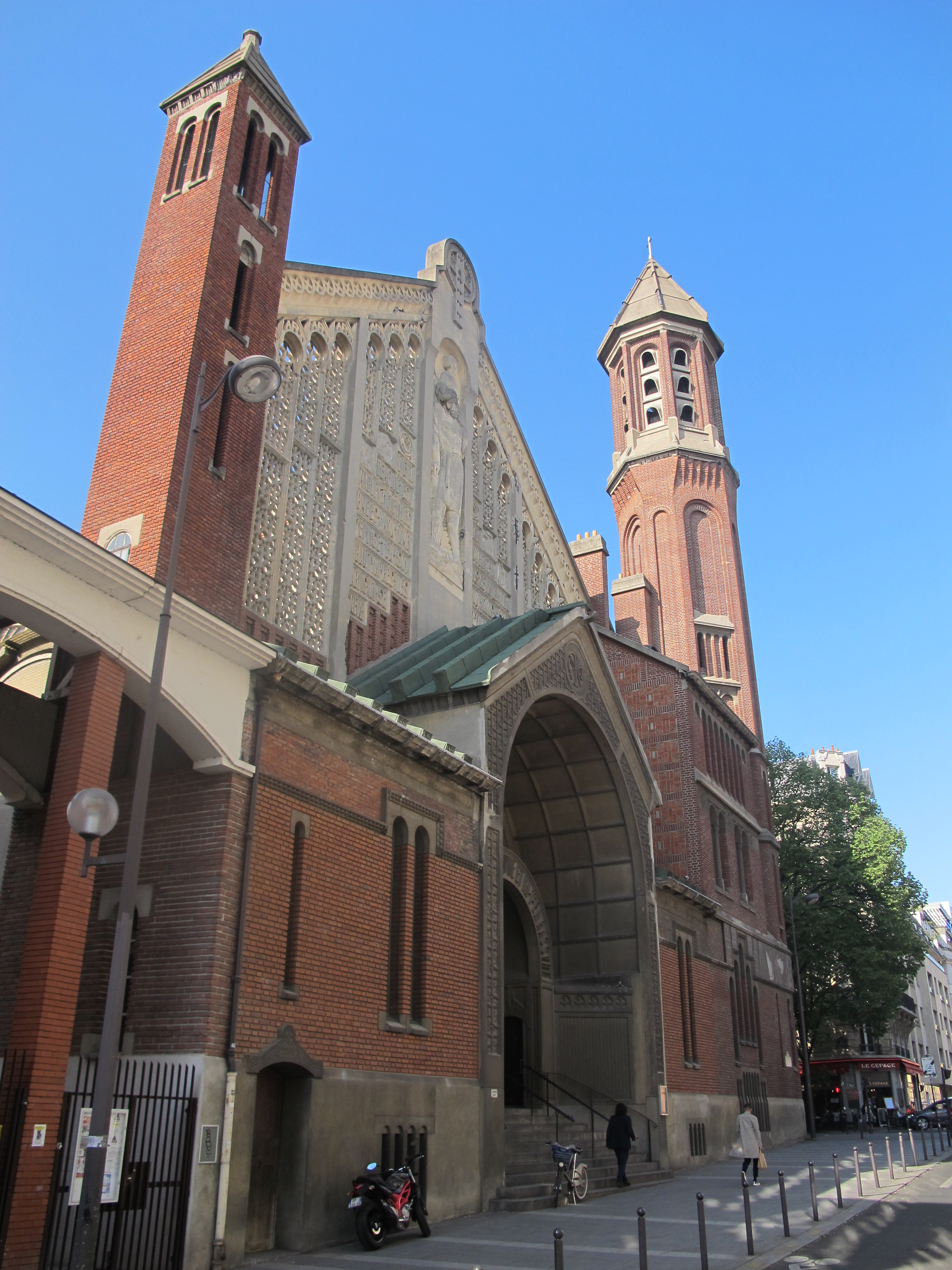
- Saint-Christophe-de-Javel
- 48°50′41″N 2°16′45″E
- Location: 4 rue Saint-Christophe in the 15th arrondissement
- Country: France
- Denomination: Roman Catholic

History
- Status: Parish church

Architecture
- Functional status: Active
- Architect: Charles-Henri Besnard
- Style: Gothic Revival and Art Deco
- Completed: 1930

Administration
- Archdiocese: Paris
- Parish: Saint-Christophe-de-Javel Chapelle

Saint-Christophe-de-Javel is a Roman Catholic church located at 4 rue Saint-Christophe in the 15th arrondissement of Paris. It was constructed between 1926 and 1930 in the newly industrialized neighborhood of Paris by the architect Charles-Henri Besnard (1881-1946), a follower of the architect and historian Viollet-le-Duc. While the church architecture is inspired by the Gothic architecture of the 13th century, it was constructed using a modern material, reinforced concrete, and made an innovative use of molded cement for the decoration of the facade and interior.

== History ==
The church was built in the neighborhood of Javel in the 15th arrondissement, an area which, beginning in the 1860, had seen the construction of many chemical and metallurgical factories, including factories which produced Eau de Javel, a variety of bleach, which gave its name to the neighborhood. After the First World War, the dominant industry became construction of transport, including locomotives, wagons and especially automobiles, including a large new factory for Citroen. The local church could not accommodate the rapid growth of the population. A project for a much larger church was launched, It was named for Saint Christopher the patron saint of automobilists and other voyagers.

The design was inspired by the Gothic architecture of the 13th century. The architect, Charles-Henri Besnard (1881-1946) was an admirer of Eugene Viollet-le-Duc, who had carried out the creative restoration of a series of Gothic cathedrals from that period. Besmard went one step further than Viollet-le-Duc. Rather than using masonry with an iron framework for the church, he went one step further, building with reinforced concrete. His ambition, he declared, was to create the kind of church that the 13th century architects would have built if they had possessed reinforced concrete.

Following Besnard's method, the elaborate columns and grills and other architectural elements of the church were prefabricated, molded of cement, then delivered to the construction site. This way, making the prefabricated architectural elements of the church could continue through the winter, when traditional construction sites closed down. However, in the end, this method of construction proved not to be economical. The additional cost of hoisting and installing all the delicate prefabricated pieces turned out to be greater than traditional construction on the site.

In 1975 The church was protected as an historic monument, as part of a nationwide effort to preserve notable Parisian architecture from the 19th and 20th centuries.

== Exterior ==
The exterior of the church is made of brick and concrete. The decoration over the portal is extremely elaborate, with molded concrete sculptural screens depicting crosses, the crown of thorns, fleurs-de-lis, and other Biblical motifs and messages.

The central element of the facade, high above the portal, is a concrete statue of Saint Christopher holding the infant Christ. The statue is by Pierre Vigoureu].The decoration of the exterior walls also includes tw fresco paintings on cement depicting Saint Christopher protecting voyagers (left) and helping the driver at the wheel of an automobile (right), since the neighborhood was the home of the major automobile factories. The frescoes were painted by Henri-Marcel Magne (1877-1944).

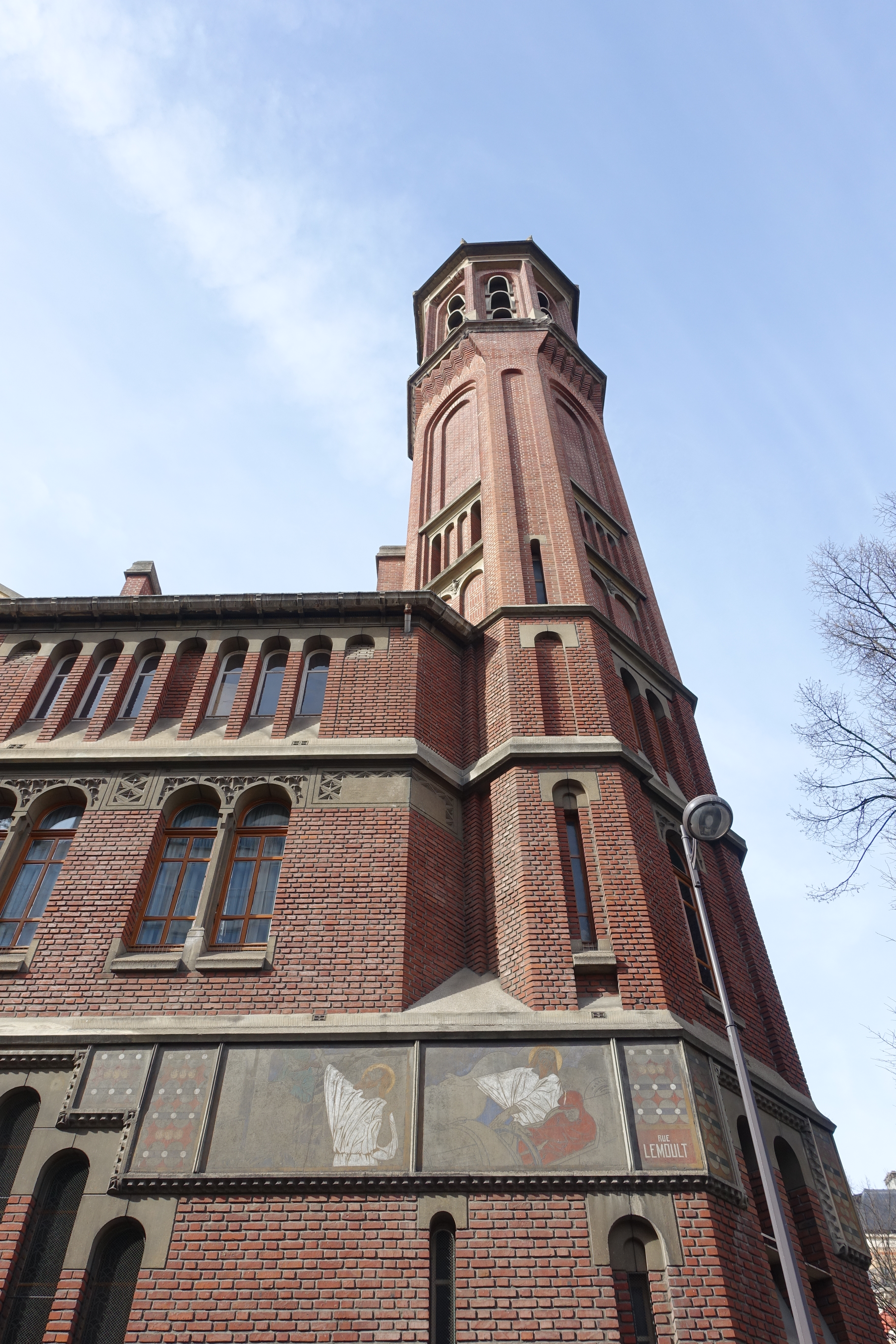
Detail of tower, with frescos painted on cement.

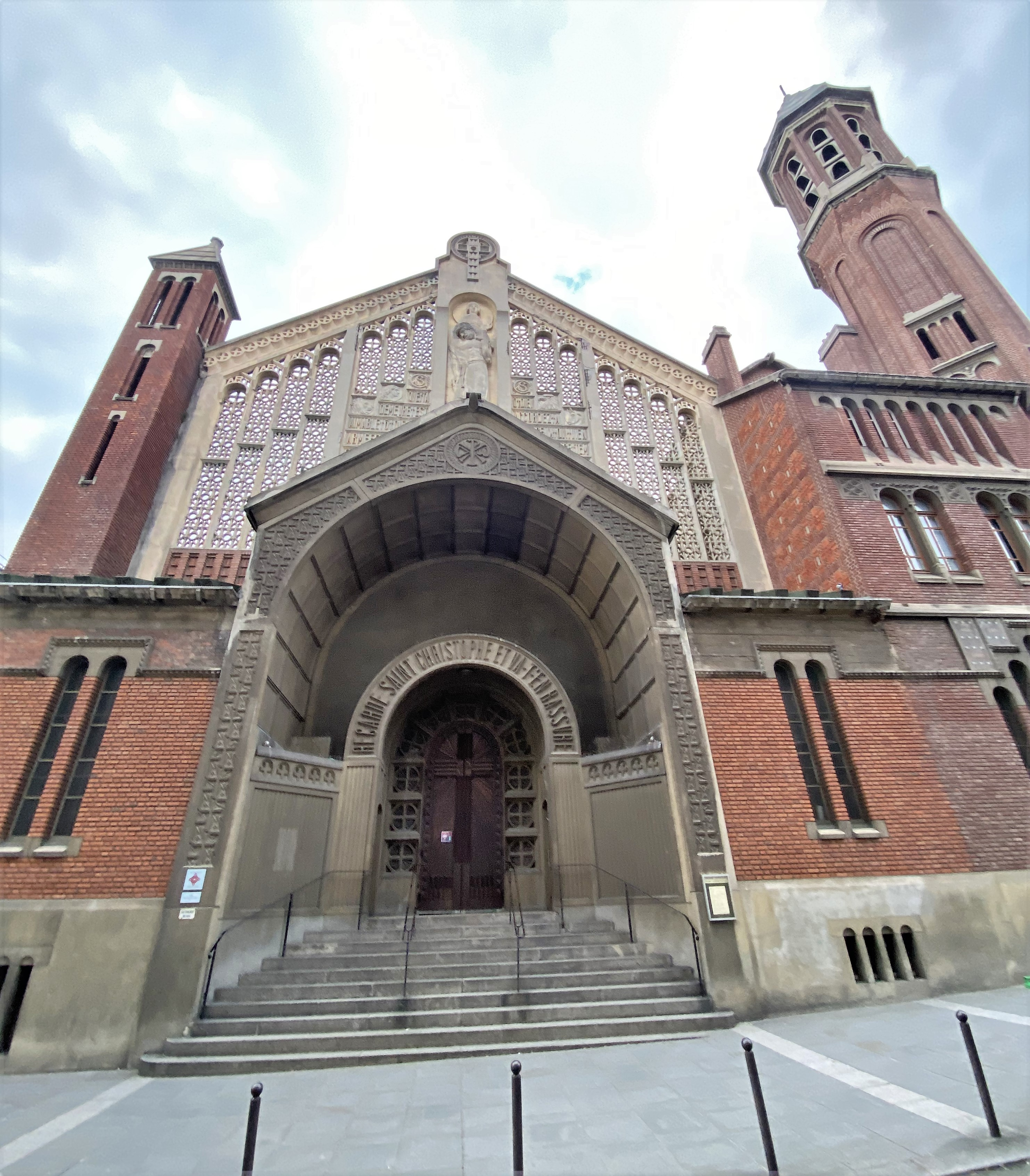
The portal, below a statue of Saint Christopher and the Christ child.

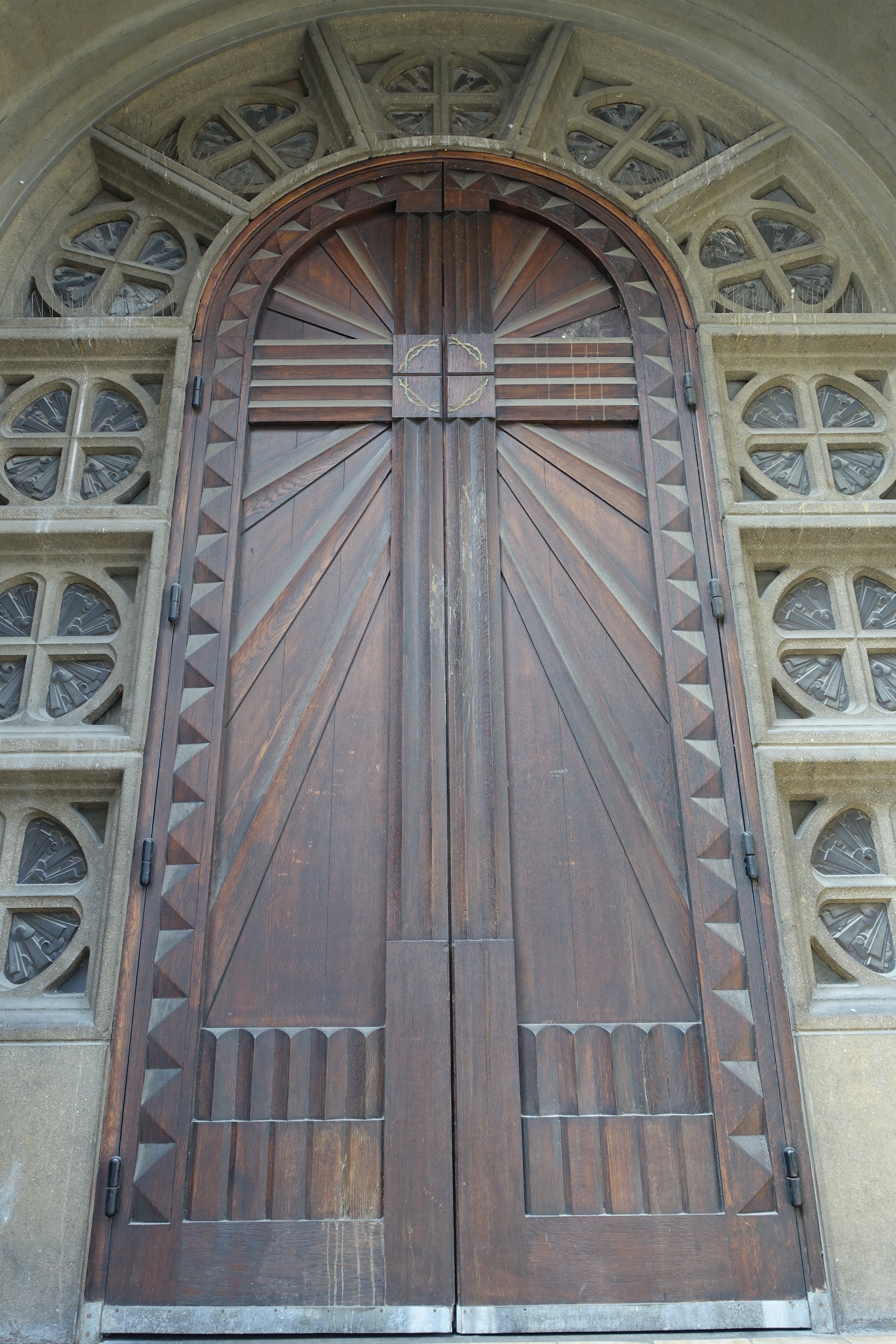
The doorway

== Interior ==
The interior of the church, like the exteriors, uses 19th century materials and construction techniques to simulate the effect of the Gothic churches of the 13th century. The tall, slender columns of the arcades that flank the nave appear to be of iron, but, like the other structural features, are made of molded concrete.

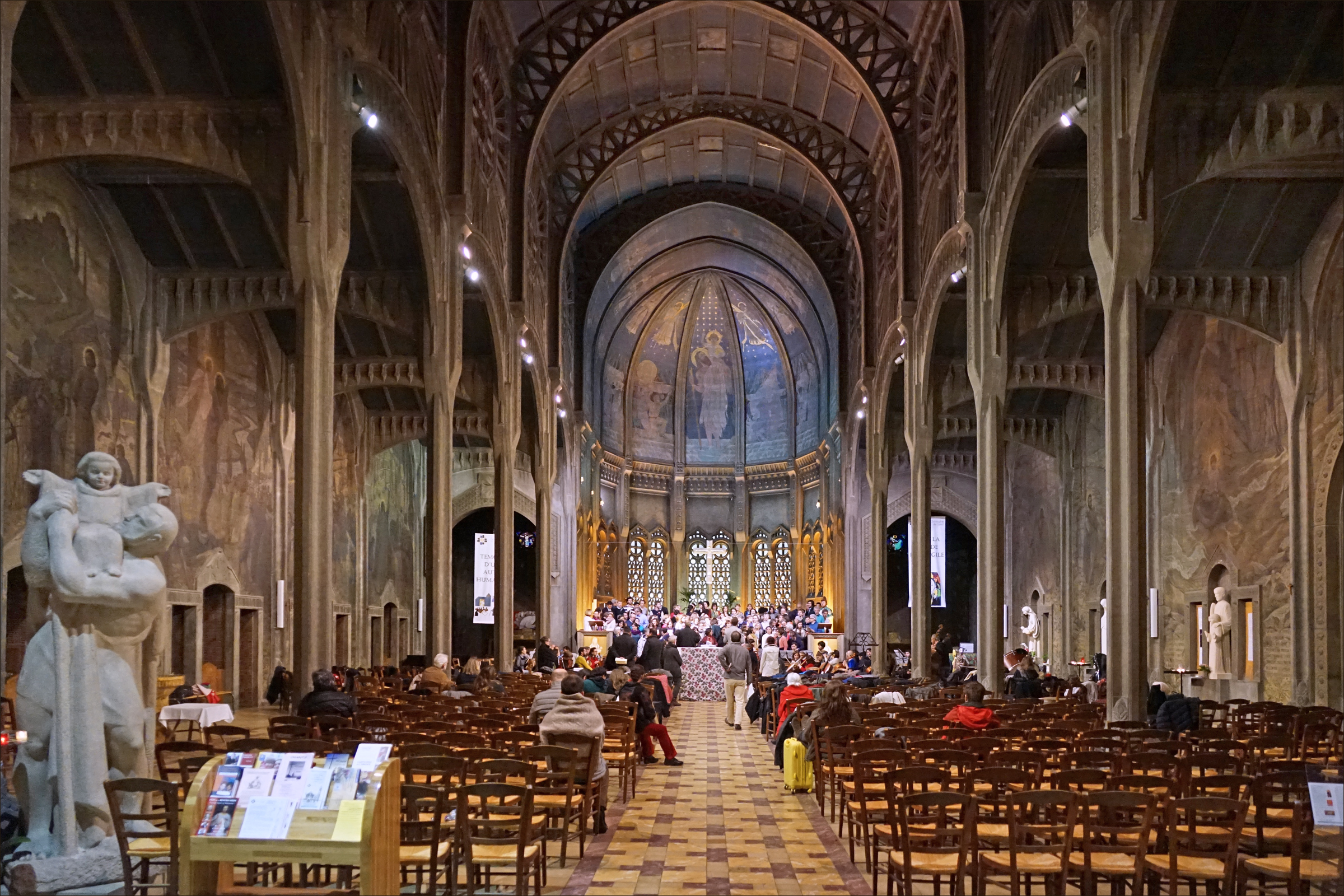
The nave looking toward the choir

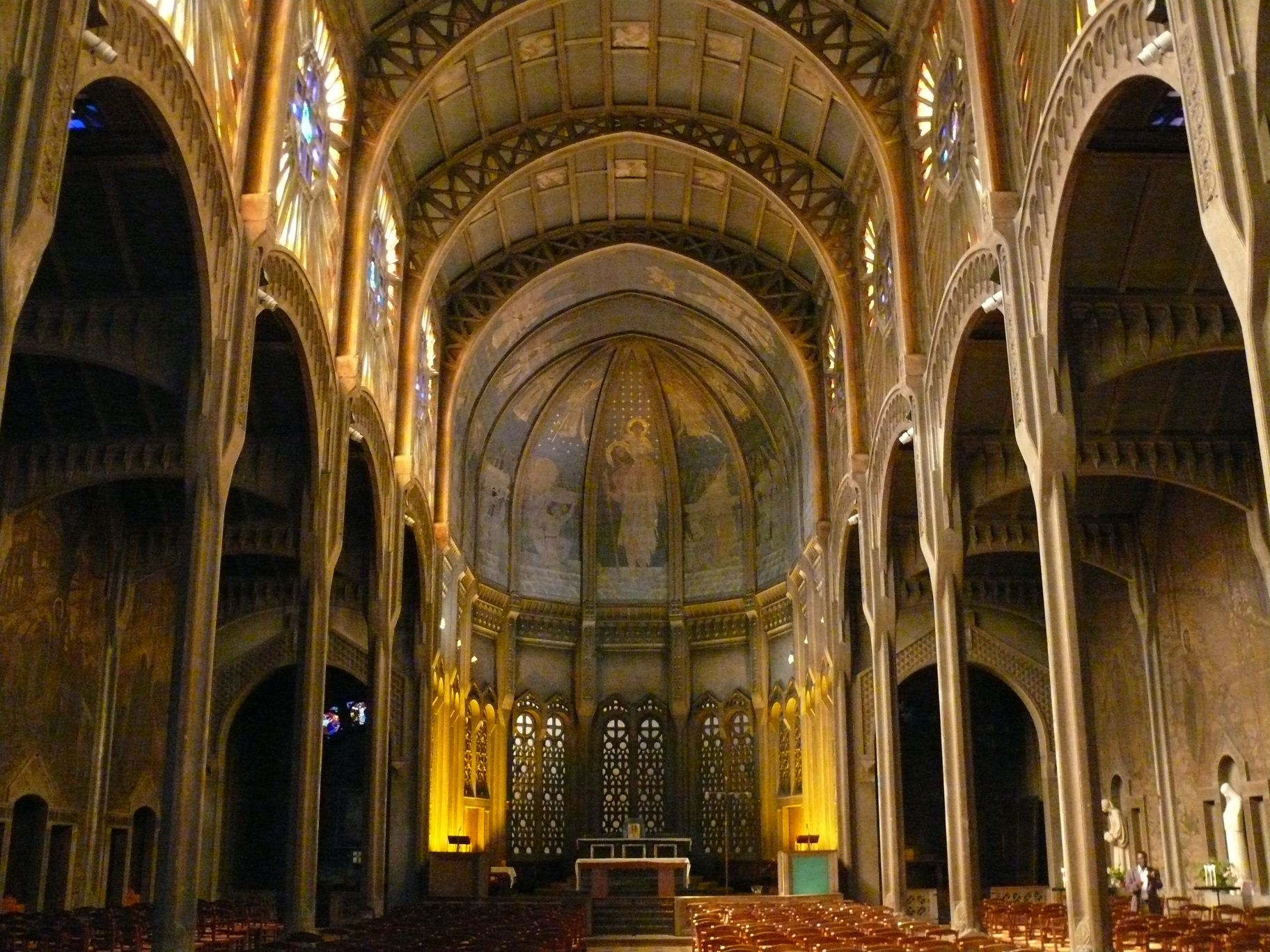
The choir

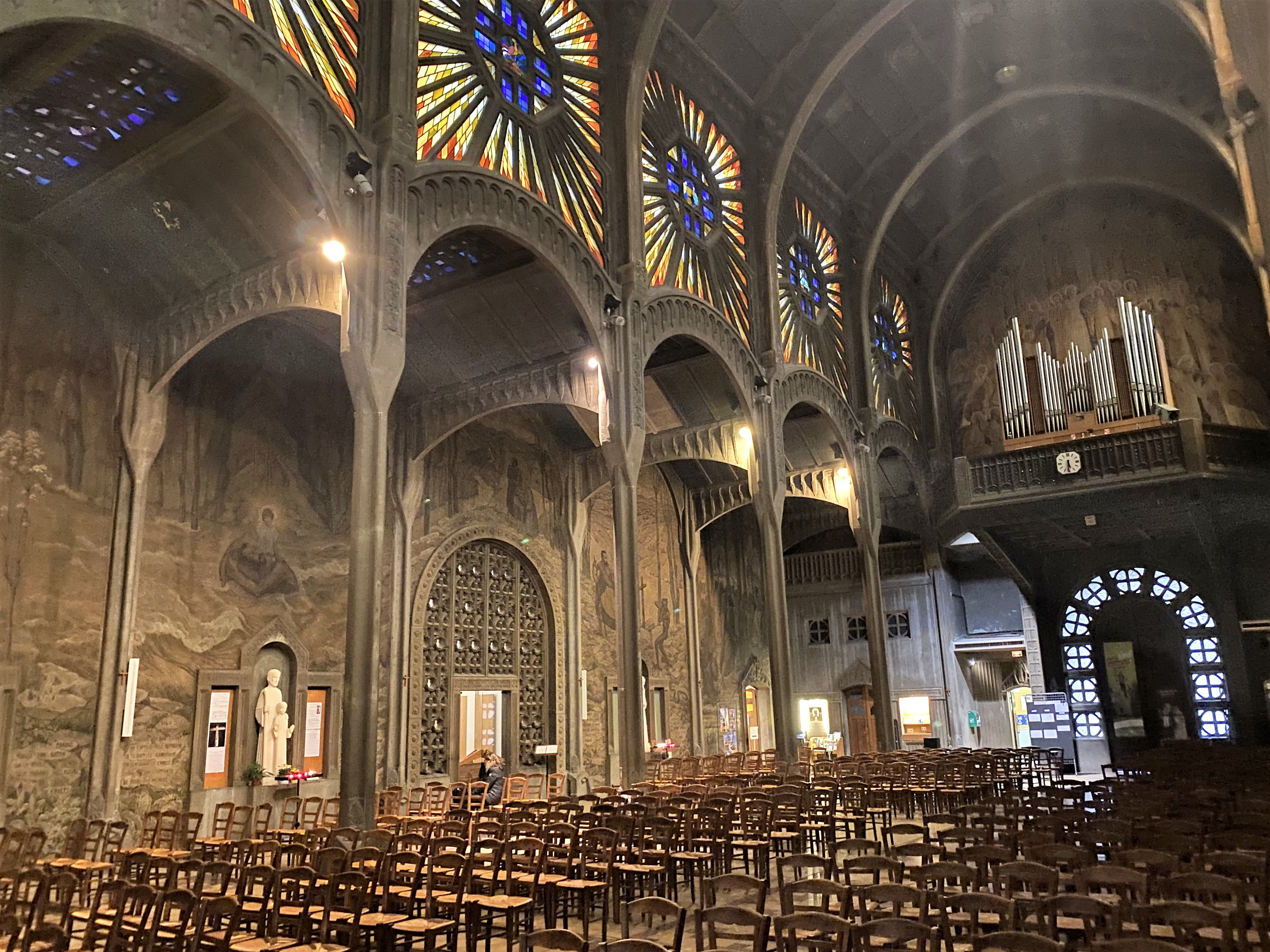
The nave, looking toward the portal, with the organ above it on the tribune

== Art and decoration ==
=== Painting ===
Art and decoration cover all of the walls and ceiling of the interior. The walls of the nave have paintings depicting scenes from the life of Saint Christopher. These a made with encaustic painting, using a heated wax medium to which colored pigments have been added. over wax. The arched vaults of the ceiling filled with panels made of staff, a kind of reinforced plaster covered with fabric, which serve as a surface for more painted decoration.

The most prominent painting in the interior is in the Art Deco style, and is found in the vault over the choir, It is by Henri-Marcel Magne (1877-1944). In the center, Saint Christopher is carrying the infant Christ on his shoulders. To his left and right are kneeling figures representing the citizens of the parish, and paintings of the various means of transport, from bicycles to automobiles and locomotives, manufactured there. in the parish.

Several paintings along the collateral aisle of the nave are by Jac Martin-Ferrières (1893-1974) and depict scenes from the life of Saint Christopher. "The Execution of Saint Christopher" on the lower left collateral aisle, illustrates his martyrdom; according to the legend, an army of archers fired arrows at the Saint, but the arrows remained suspended in the air, and could not touch him. He was finally beheaded, shown in another painting in the same aisle. Another painting in the same aisle illustrates Saint Christopher refusing to make sacrifices to the false gods.

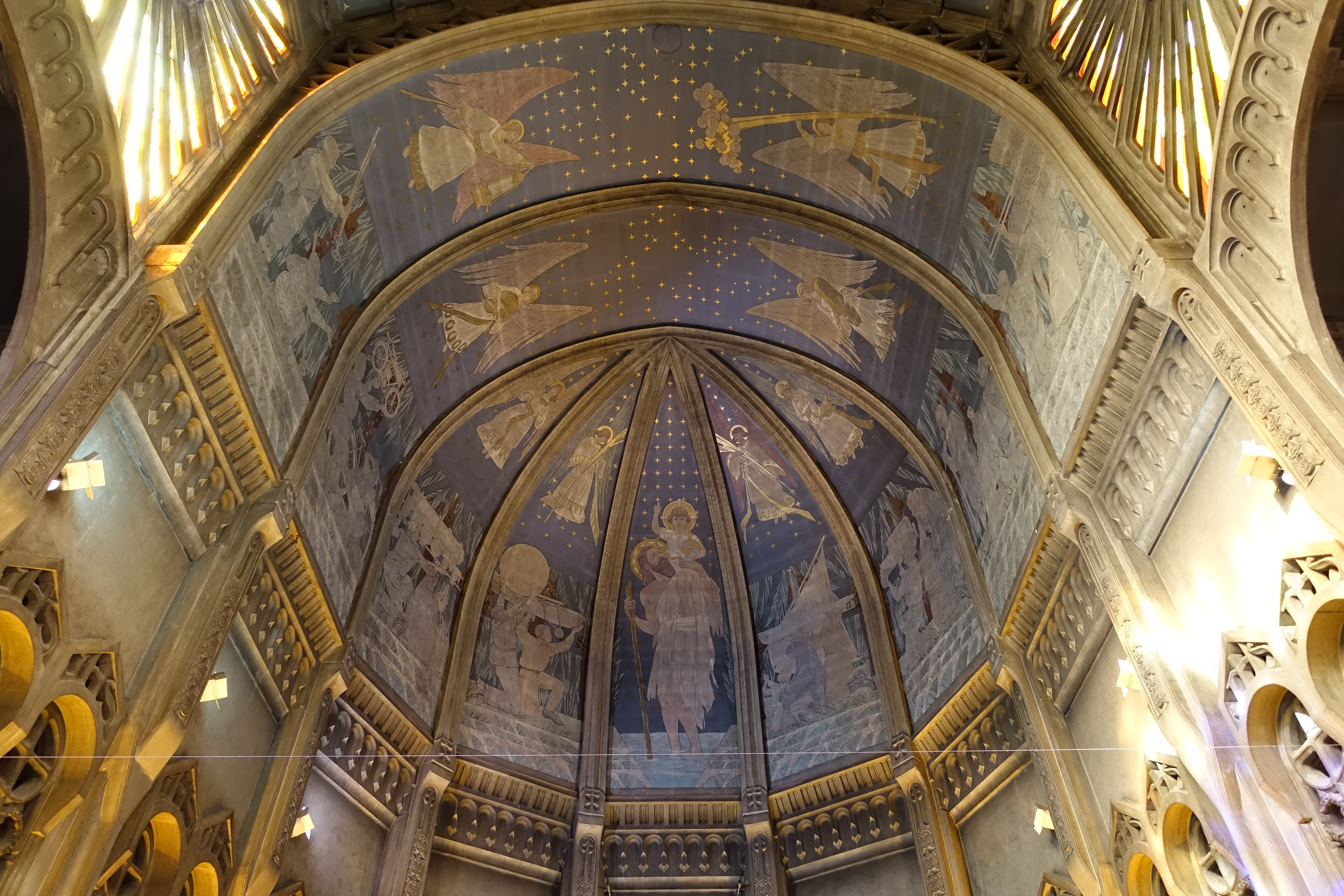
Painting over the Choir depicting St. Christopher with workers of the parish by Henri-Marcel Magne

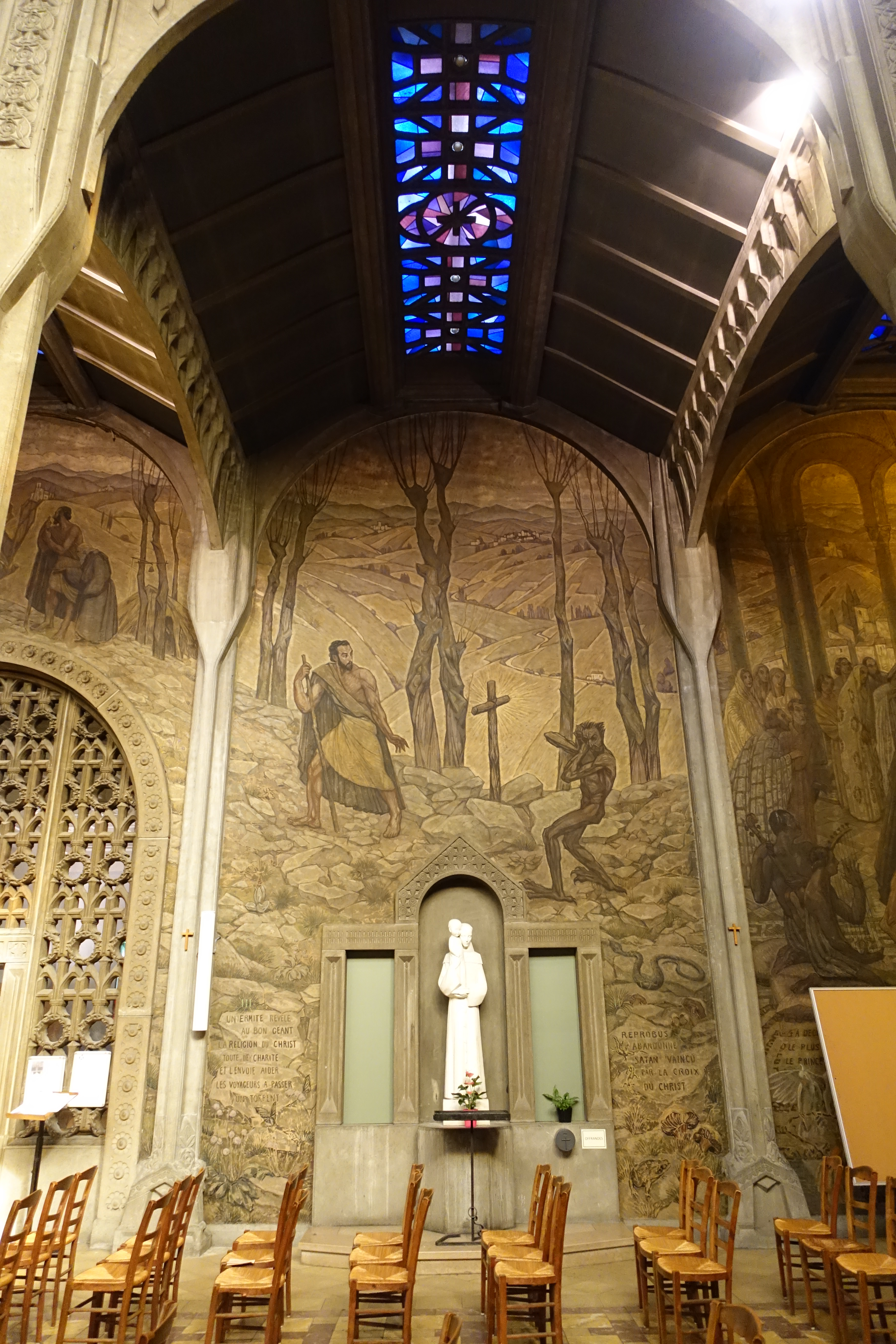
"Saint Christopher confronts the Devil" by Jac Martin-Ferrières (1893-1974)

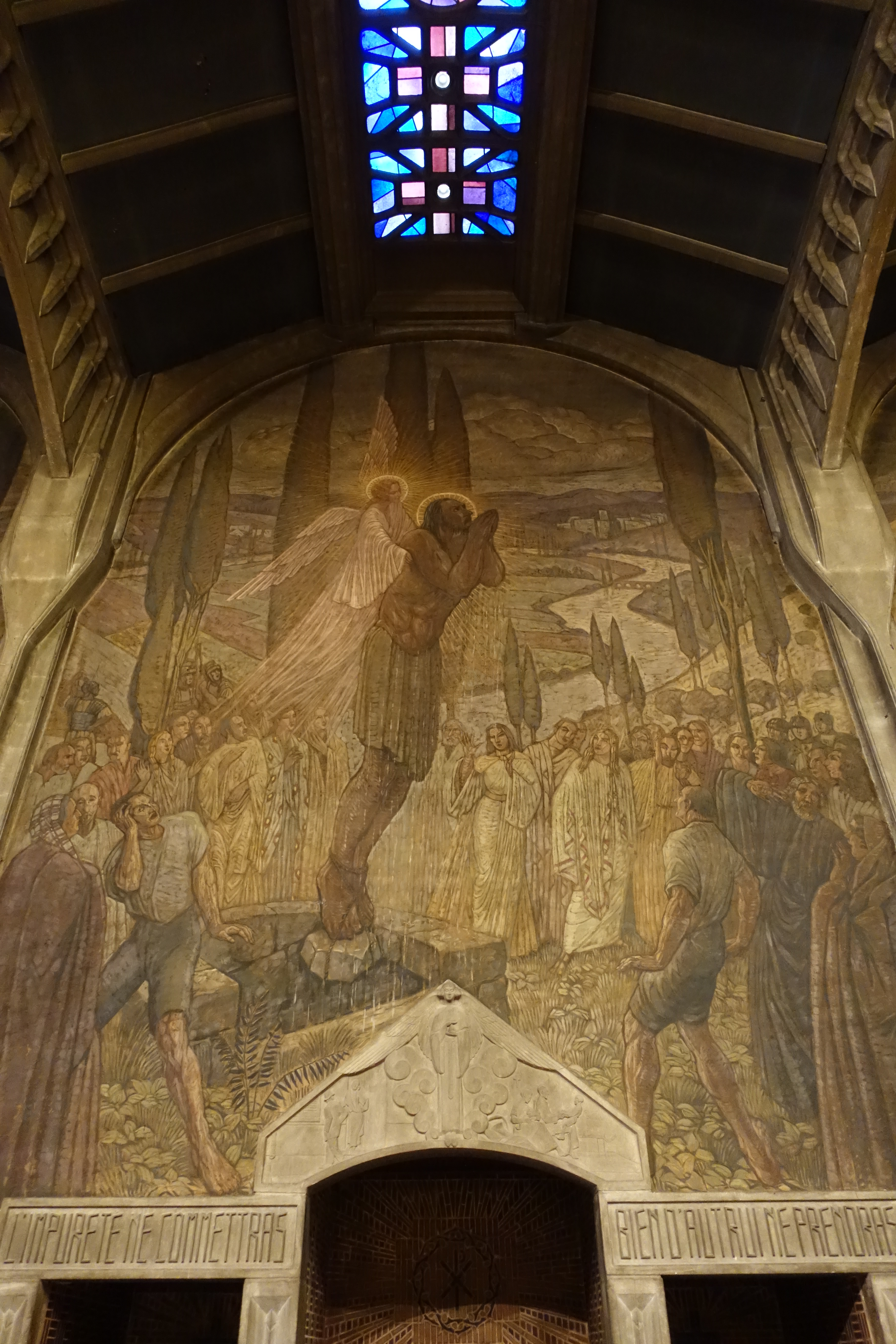
Nave painting of St. Christopher ascended to heaven

=== Stained Glass ===
Many of the stained-glass windows of the church are the work of Henri-Marcel Magne (1877-1944) in the modernist style of the first half of the 20th century, and by Jacques Gruber of the École de Nancy

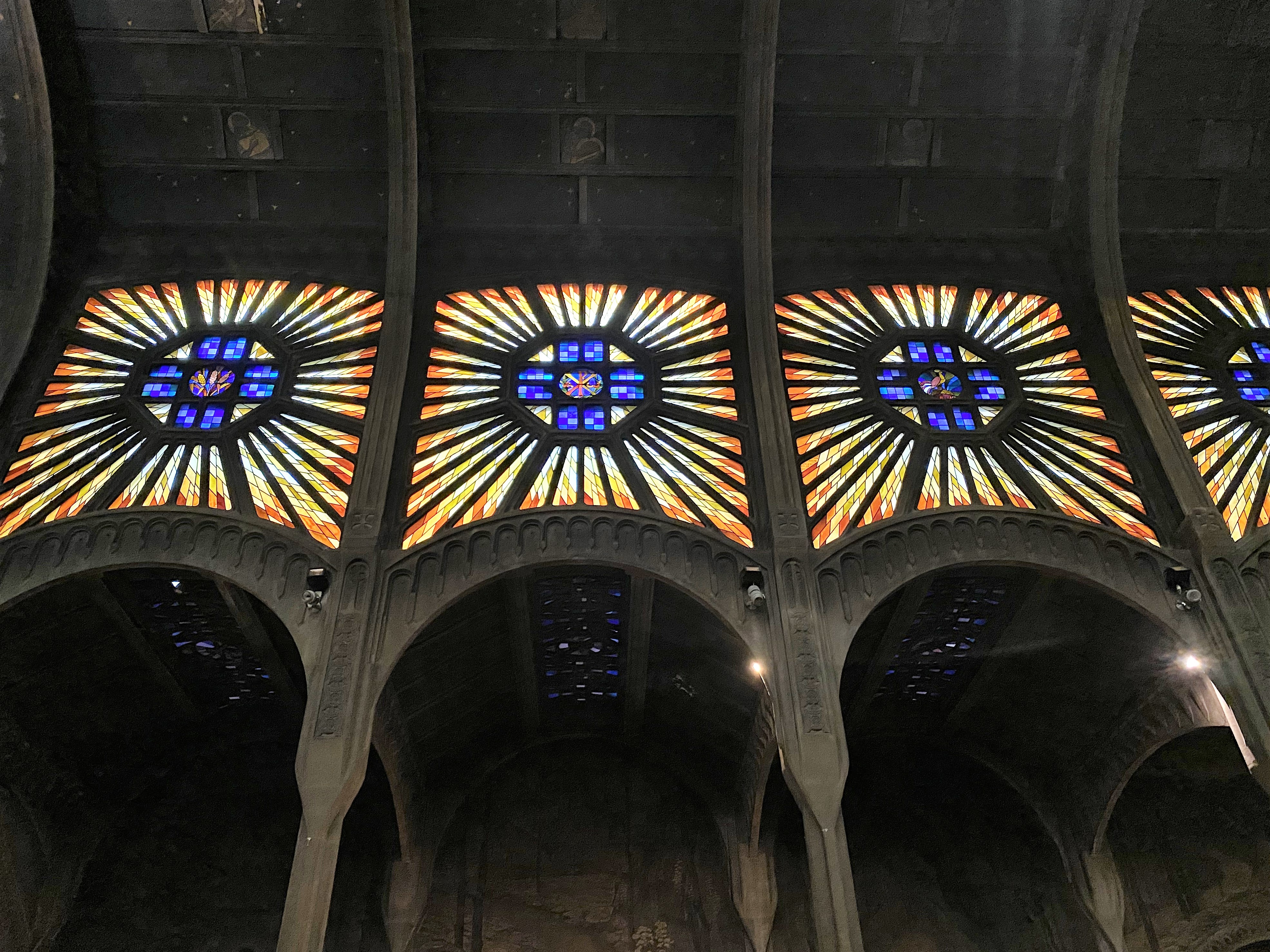
Stained glass windows in sunburst design over the side aisles of nave

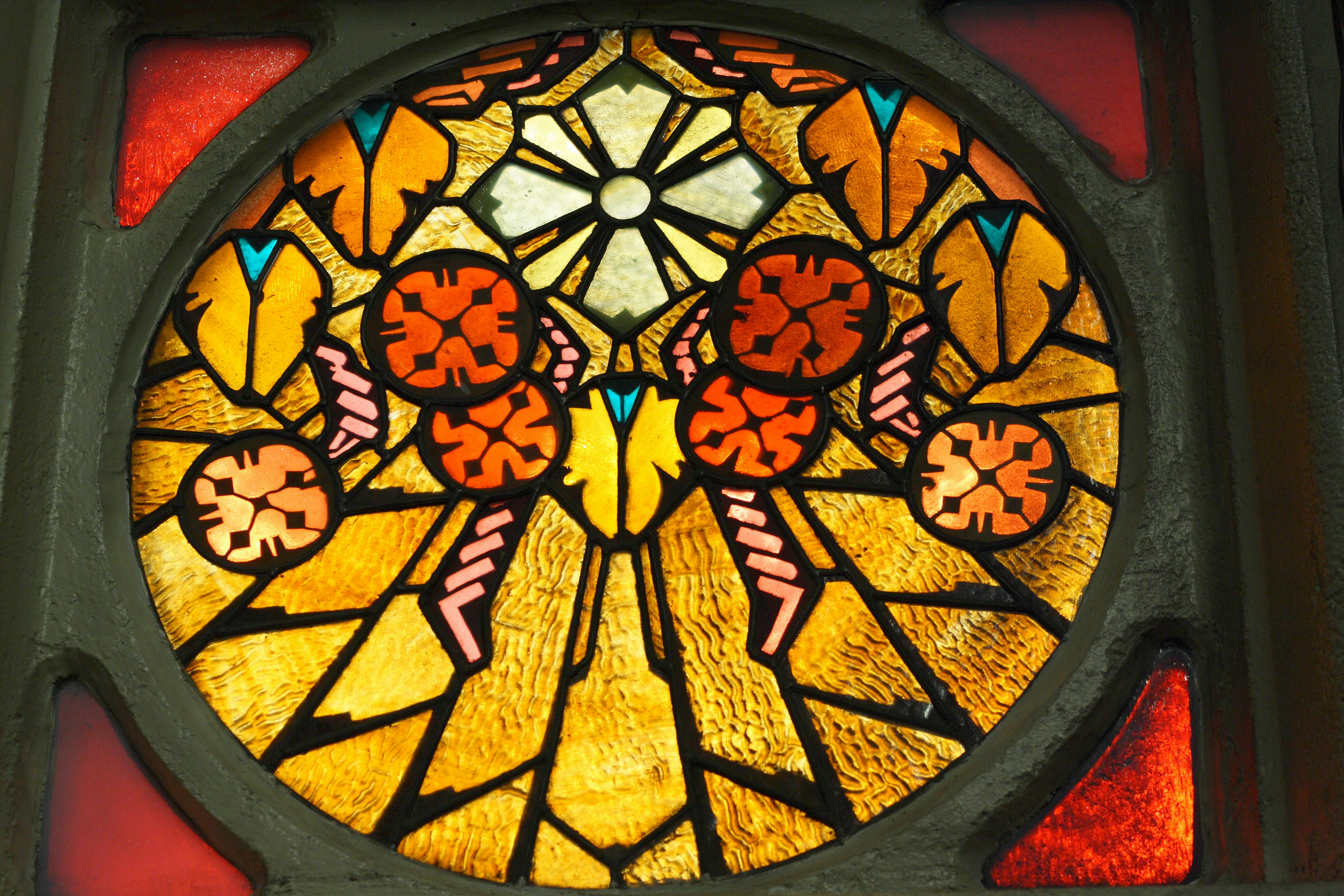
Detail of a medallion near the main portal

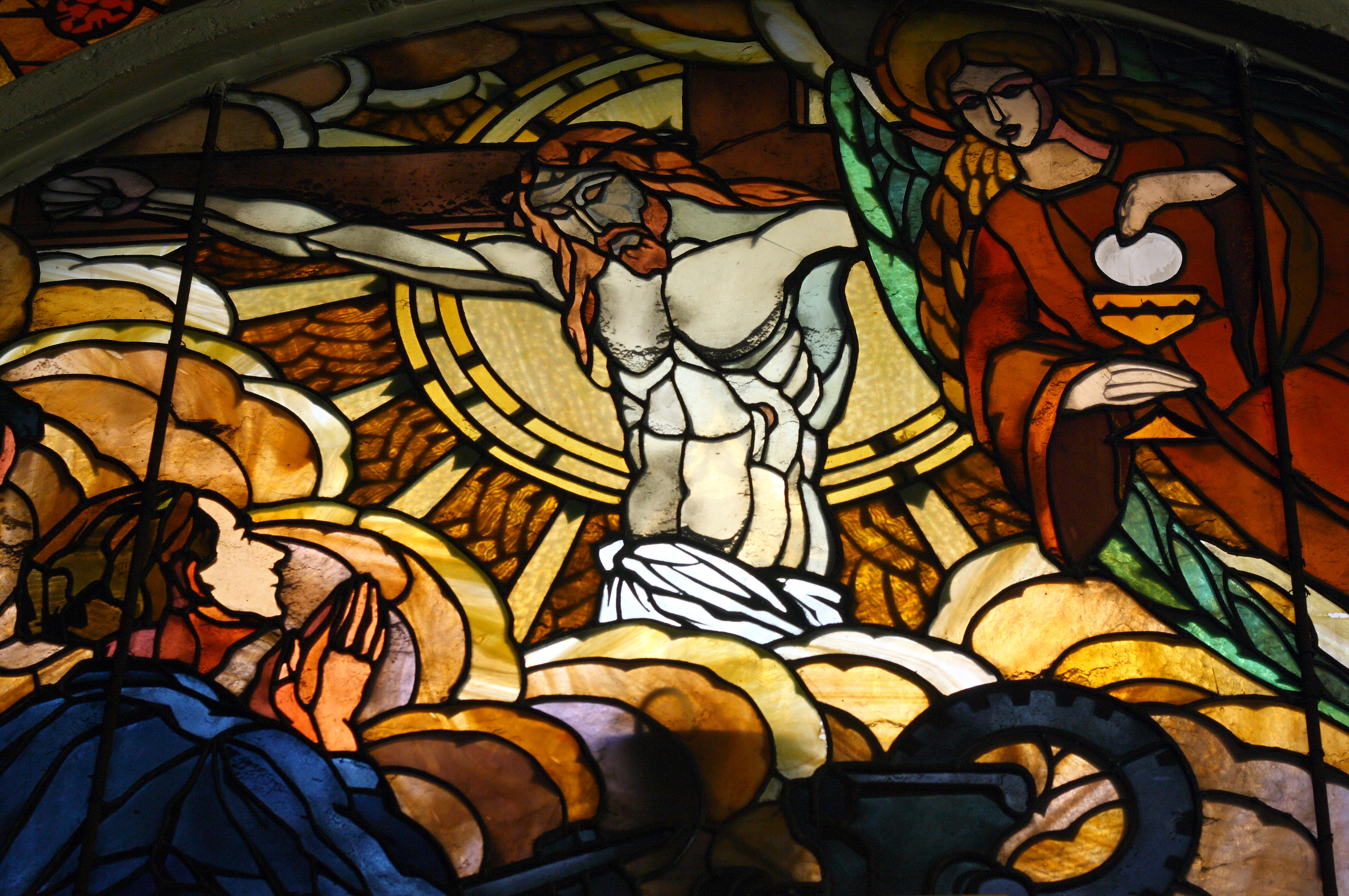
Detail of Crucifixion window near church entrance

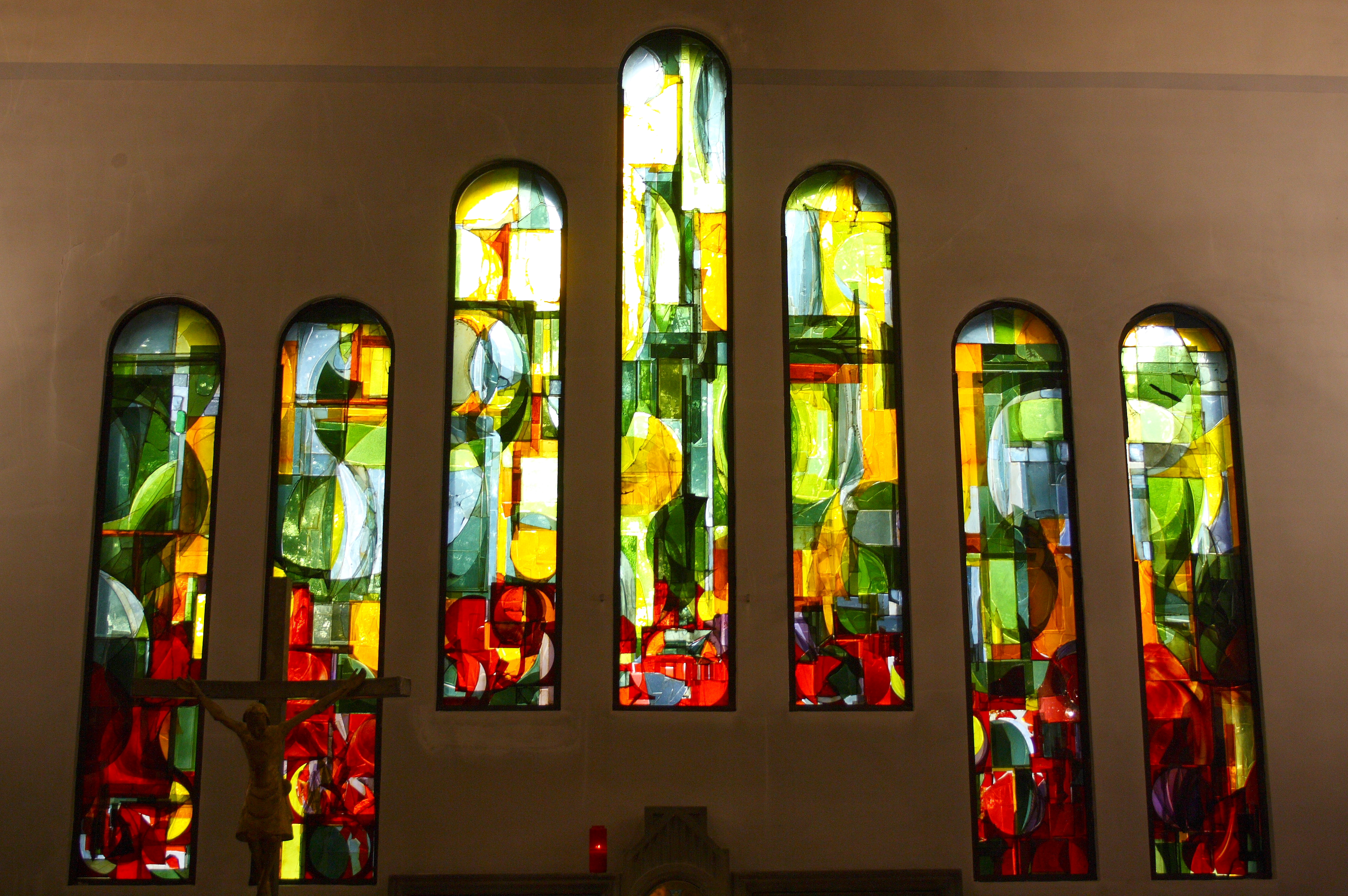
Abstract windows in the Chapel of the Virgin

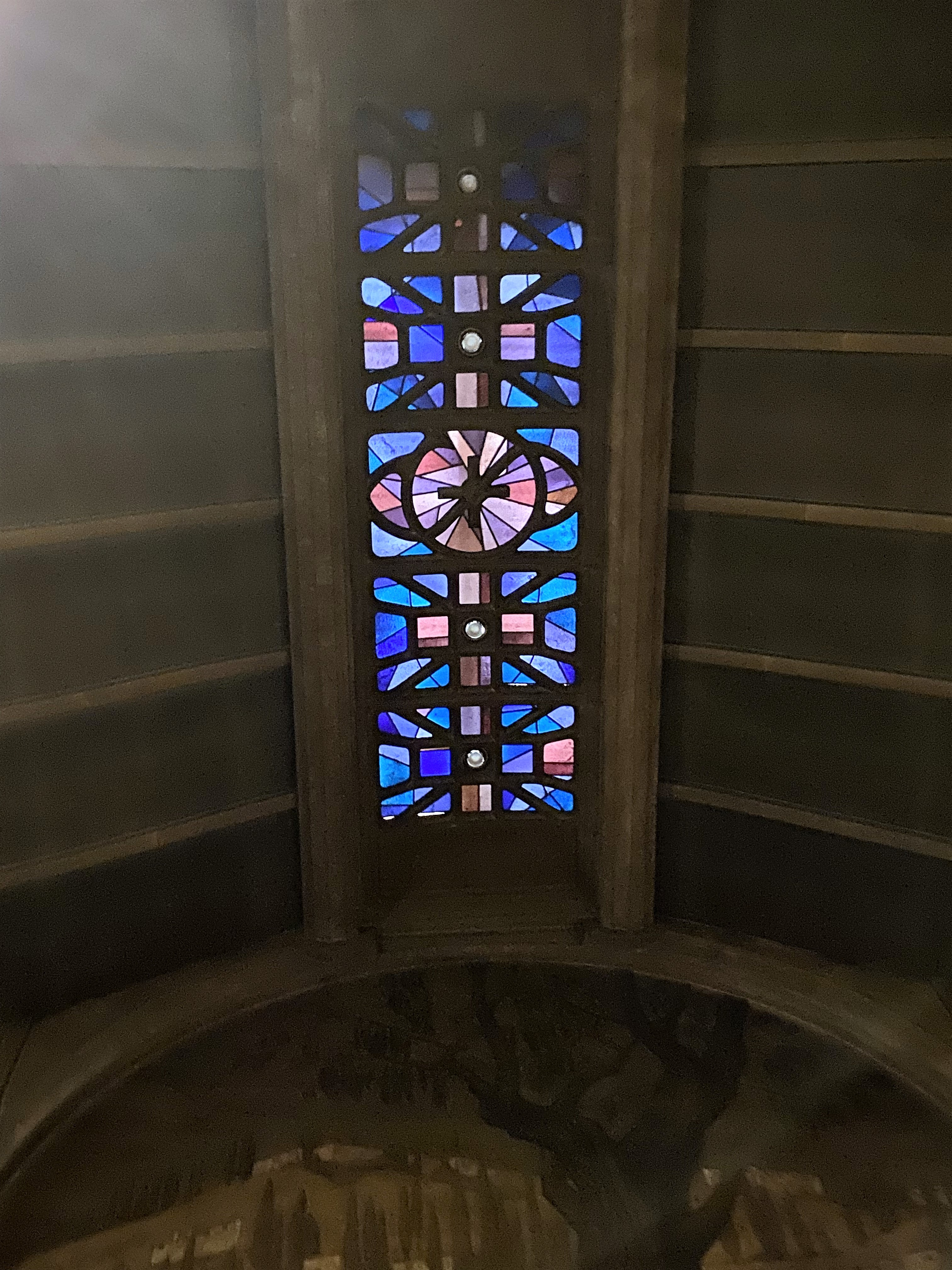
Glass in ceiling vault over the collateral aisle

=== Sculpture ===
Many of the works of sculpture, are made of molded concrete rather than stone. One example is the Statue of Saint Christopher and the Christ Child, by Pierre Vigoureaux (1884-1965)

Abundant sculptural decoration of molded concrete is also found in the pulpit, doorways, columns, and other architectural details,

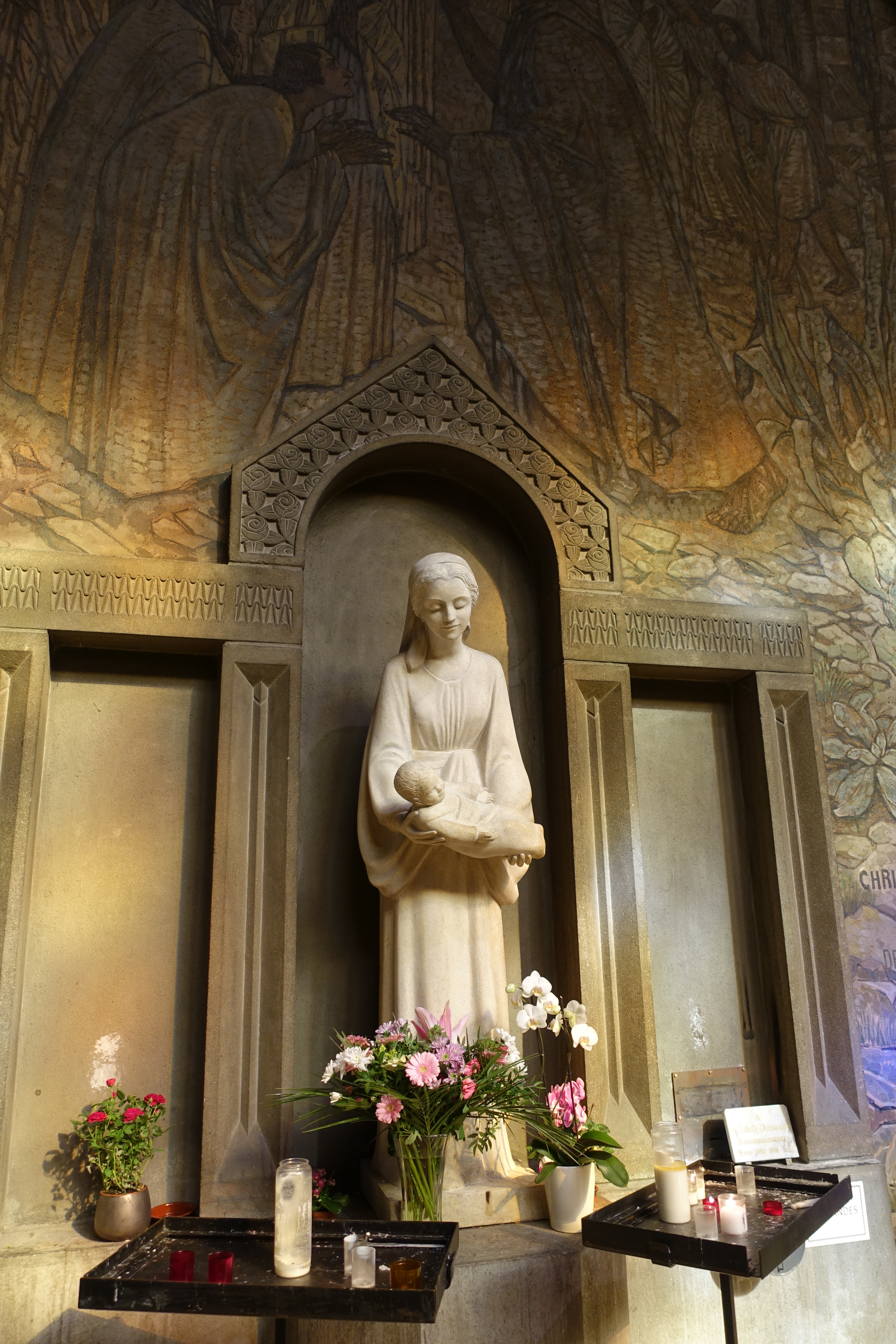
Saint Francoise holding the Infant Christ, by Pierre Vioureaux

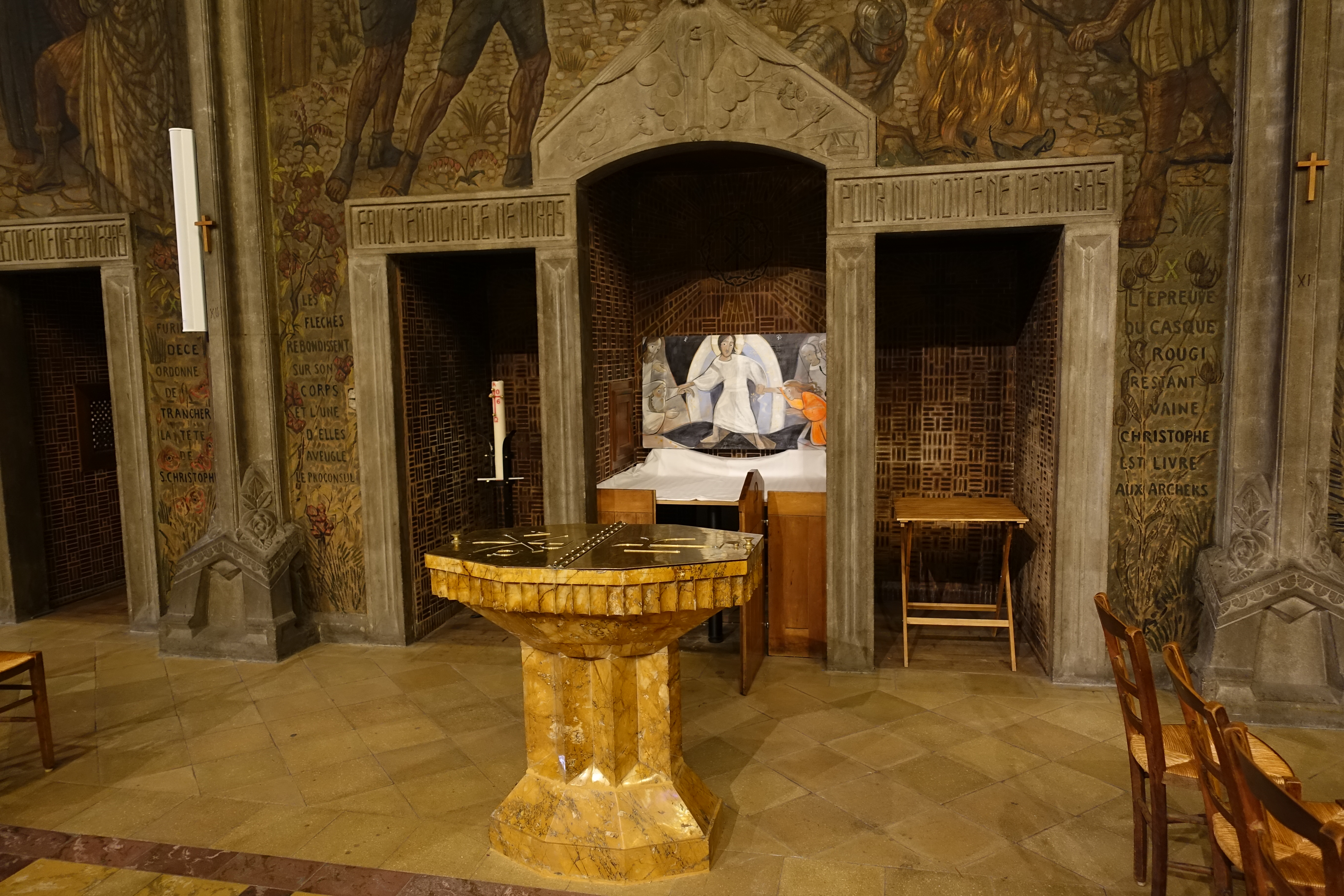
The Baptitry and Baptismal Font

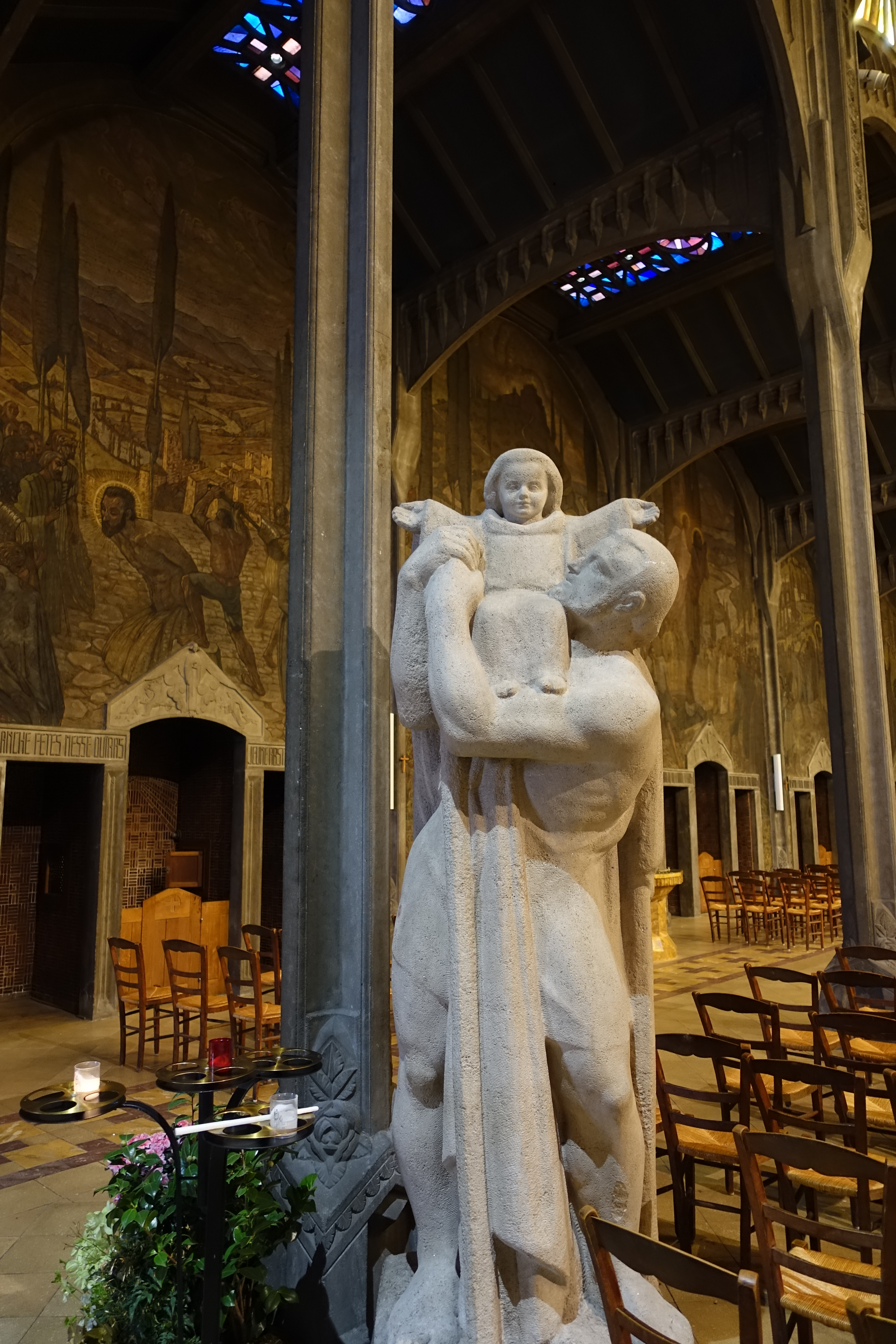
Saint Christopher and the Christ Child, by Pierre Vigoureaux
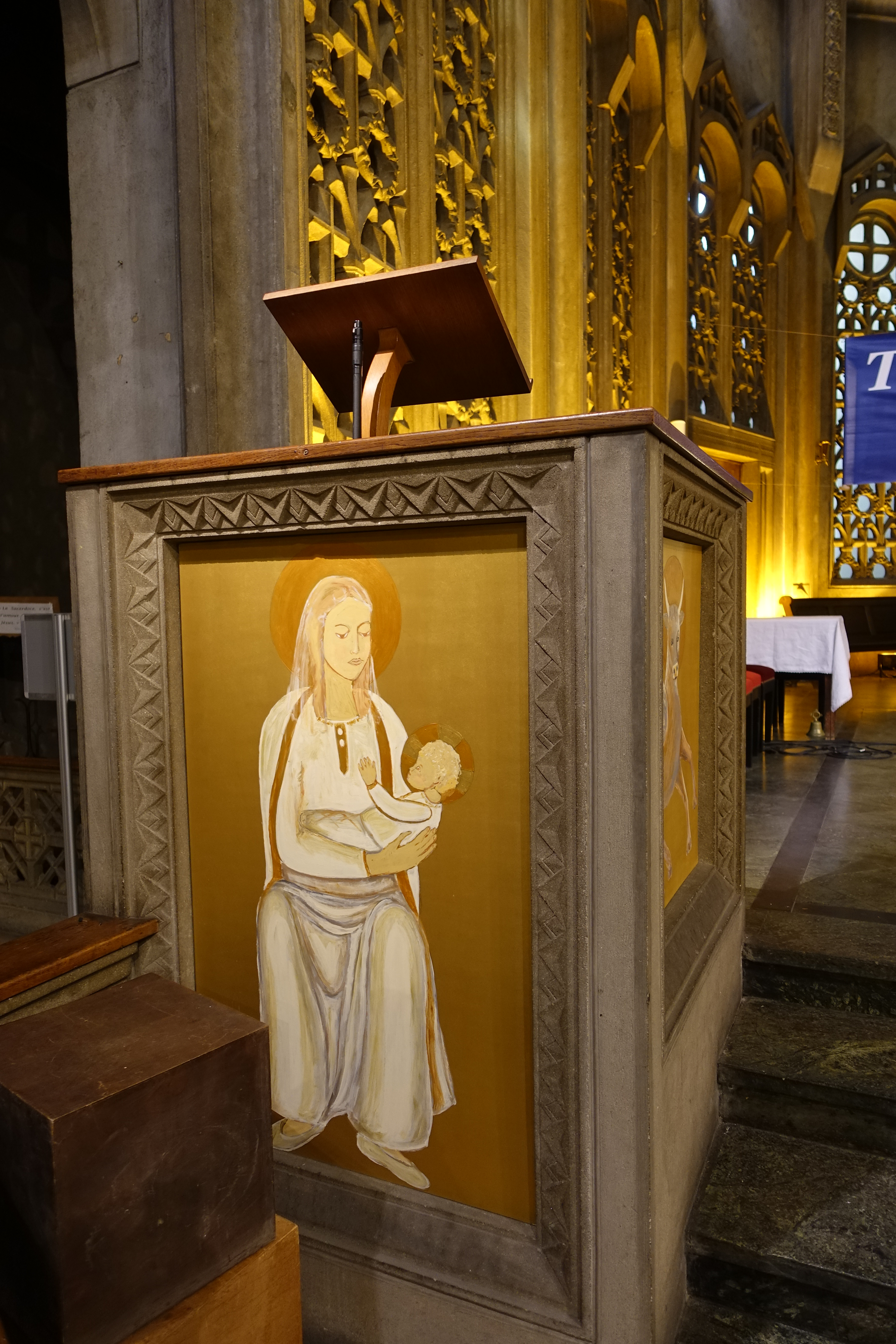
Painting and Decoration on the pulpit

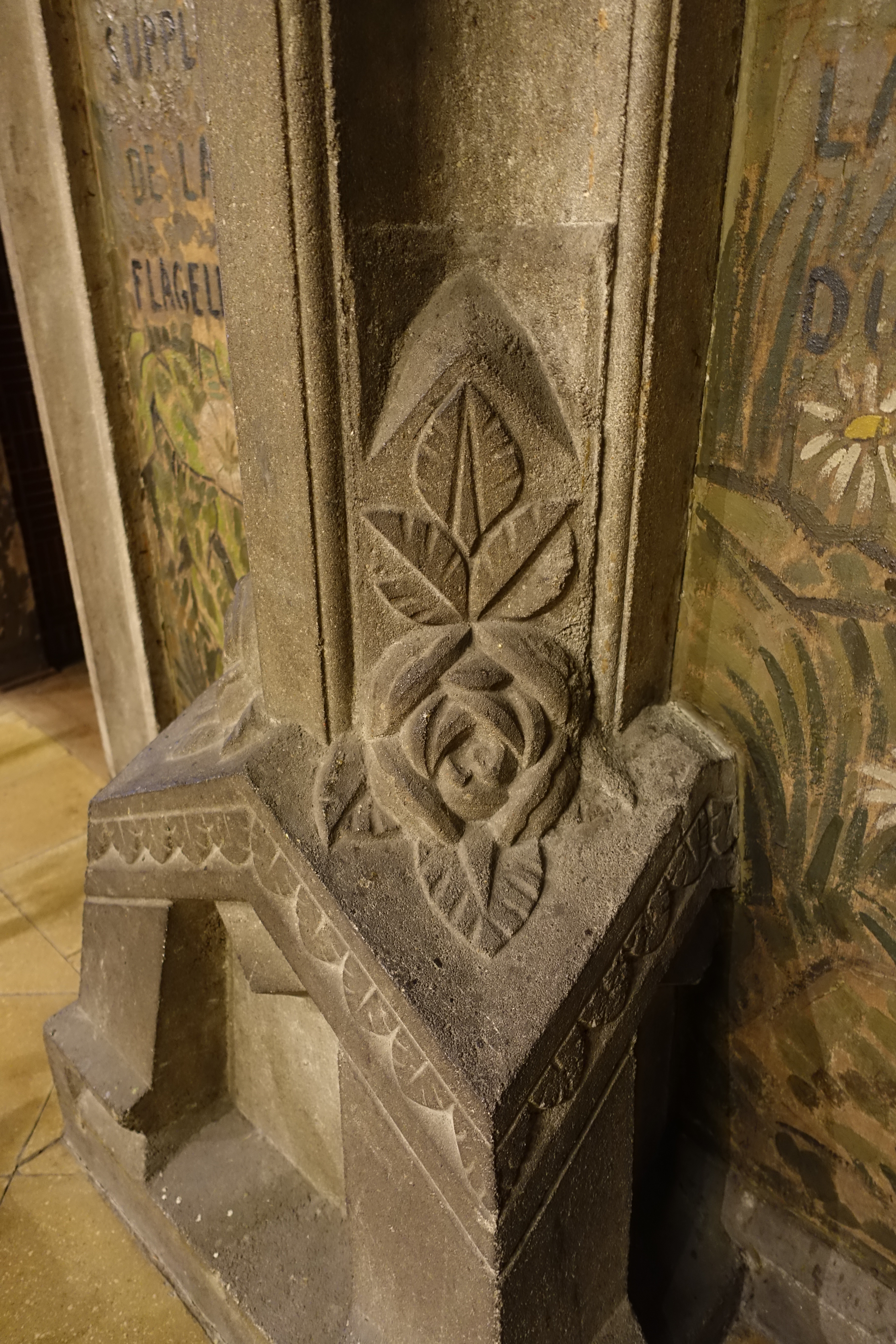
Molded concrete flower on the base of a pillar

== The Organ ==
The main organ of the church is located in the tribune over the portal to the nave. The instrument was built by the Schwenkedel firm in 1972. Behind the organ the wall is filled with. a fresco of a choir of angels, attributed to Henri-Marcel Magne.

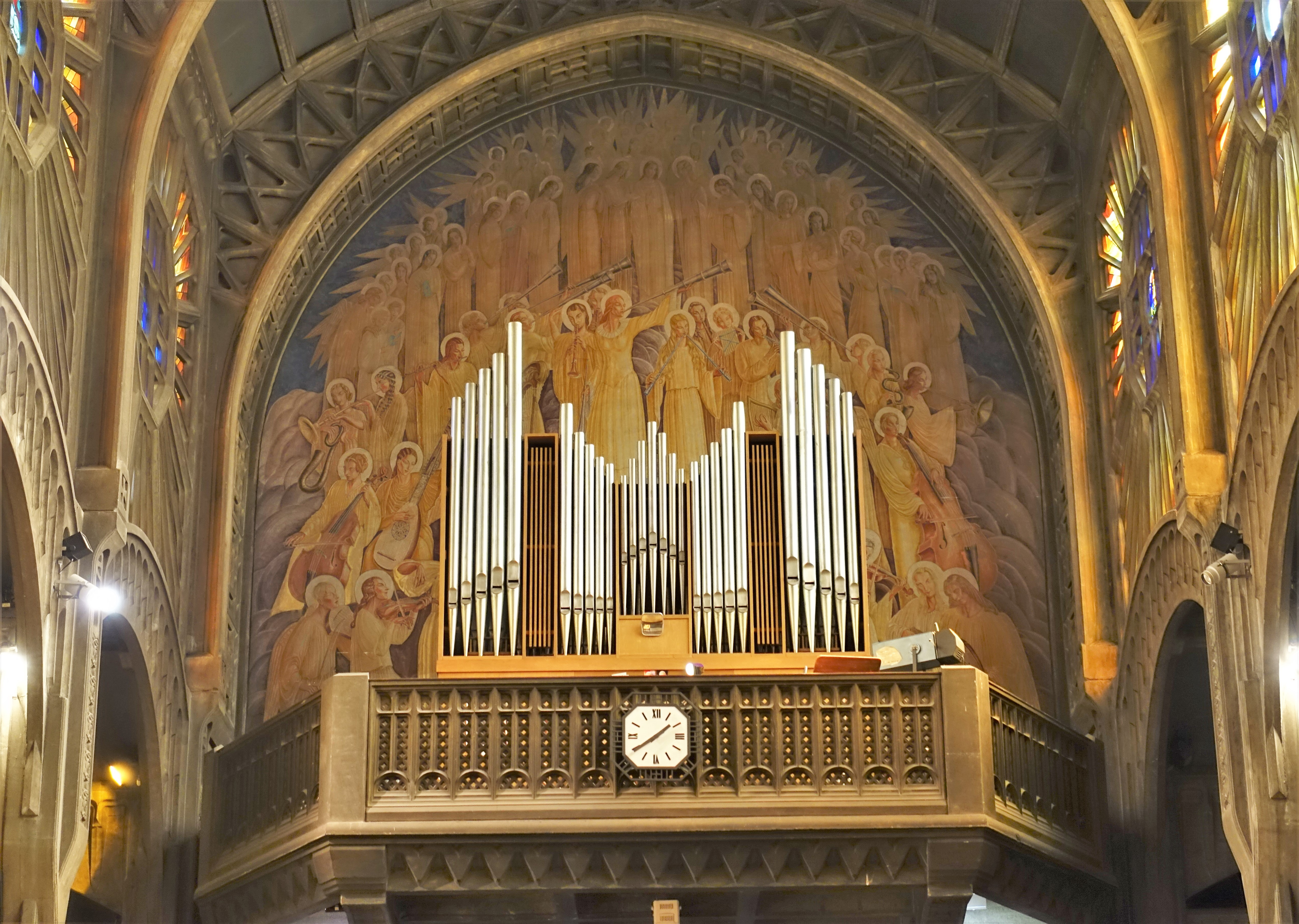
The organ in the tribune of the nave, in front of a painting of a choir of angels
