= Cuni =

Cuni or CuNi may refer to

- Cuni.cz, Charles University in Prague, Czech Republic
- Cupronickel, an alloy of copper and nickel (CuNi)
- Preng Çuni, leader of the Communist Party of Albania 8 November
- Teuta Cuni (born 1973), Swedish boxer
- Pedro Cuni-Bravo, Spanish artist
