= Fernando Leal Audirac =

Italian painter (born 1958)

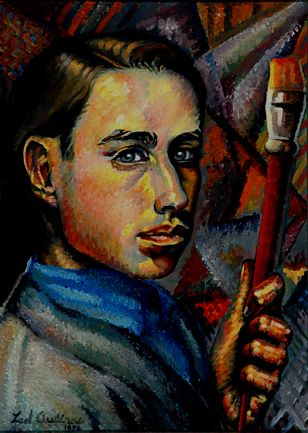
- Fernando Leal Audirac, Self-Portrait 1975-1976
- Born: 16 November 1958; Mexico City
- Known for: Painting
- Movement: Realism, figurative art
- Relatives: Fernando Leal (father)

Fernando Leal Audirac (born 16 November 1958 in Mexico City, Mexico) is a visual artist, painter, sculptor, etcher and designer. He is a specialist of classical painterly techniques, such as fresco, encaustic, egg tempera, oil, that he reinterprets in a contemporary key, combining them with modern technology.

== Life ==
Fernando Leal Audirac was born in Mexico City into a family of artists. His father Fernando Leal (1896–1964) was one of the founders of the Mexican Muralist movement of the Twenties.

From 1974 to 1978, Fernando Leal Audirac studied Medieval and Renaissance painterly techniques under the direction of Master Guillermo Sánchez Lemus. Together with Professor Manuel Serrano, he founded in 1978 the "Restauro" workshop in Mexico City, specializing in the research of contemporary reinterpretation of the classic artistic techniques such as fresco, encaustic, egg tempera and oil painting.

In the period from 1980 to 1985 he practiced lithography and etching at the "Taller de Gráfica Popular" with Master Printmaker José Sánchez.

1989 to 1993, he was a founding member and academic tutor of the Curatorial Commission of the Mexican National Council for the Arts (Comisión Consultiva del FONCA).

In the 1980s, he founded an intellectual Salon (the Friday Group) at his home, attended by prominent personalities of the international cultural scene, among whom: Juan Acha, Arturo González Cosío, Ernesto de la Peña, Michael Tracy, José Luis Cuevas, Miguel Peraza, Phil Kelly, Mahia Biblos, Jens Jesen, Pierre Restany, Shifra Goldman, Arnold Belkin, Francis Alÿs, and Jan William.

In 1993 he was the first artist of his generation to have a solo exhibition at the Palace of Fine Arts in Mexico City. In 1995 he represented Mexico at the Centennial of the Venice Biennale, where he exhibited again in 2001. In 1996 he was appointed guest professor at École nationale supérieure d'art in Nancy, France.

He has shown his works in galleries and museums in the US, Germany, Italy, Spain, France, Hungary, Romania, Korea and Latin America. He has written numerous essays on art and literature and participated in several international symposia regarding art, science and environment organized by the European Environmental Tribunal.

Since 1993, he lives between Milan, Italy and Mexico City.

== Works ==
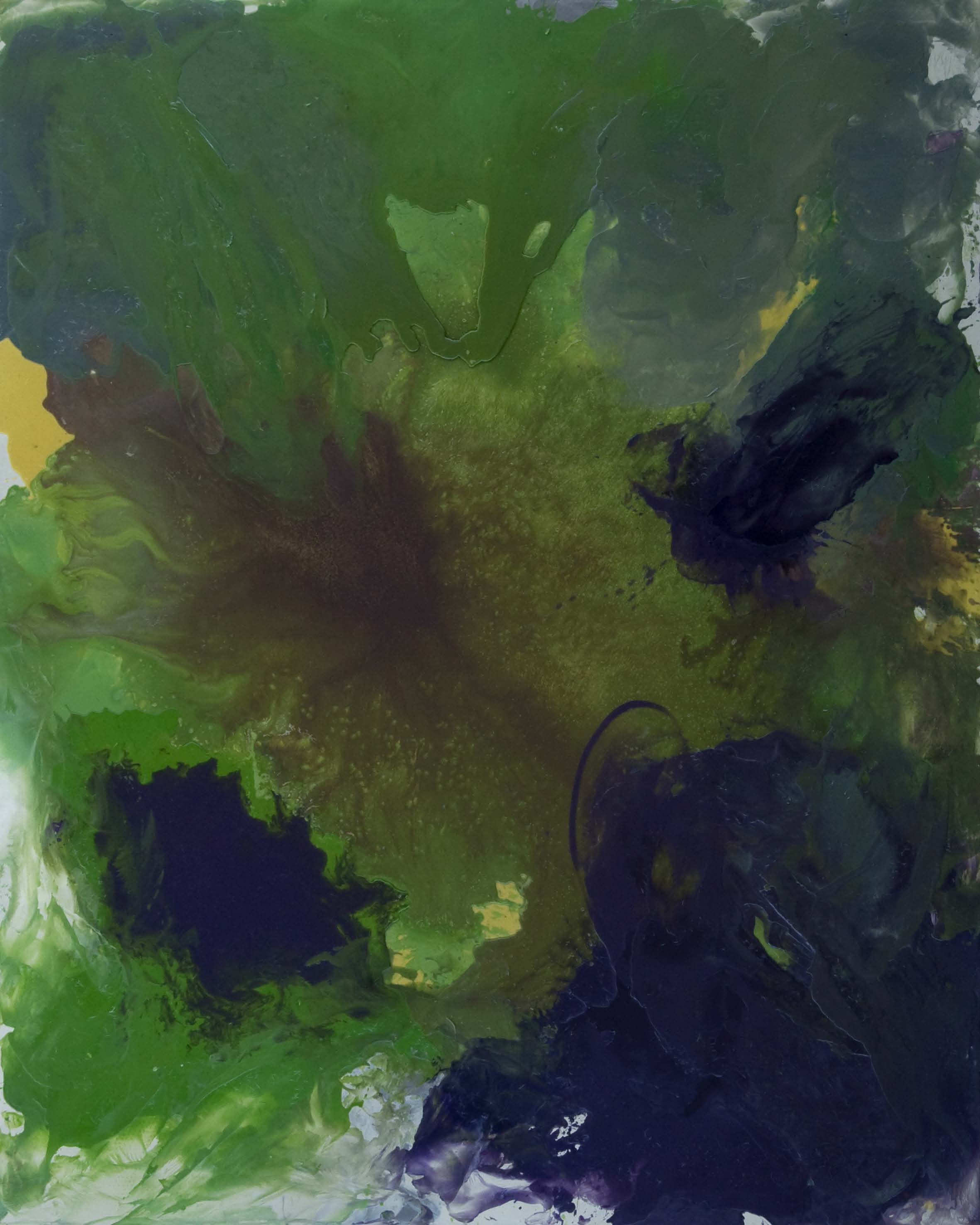
Fernando Leal Audirac, The Gardens of Erbaluce, 2009 (encaustic)

=== Transportable frescos ===
Leal Audirac has developed a particular type of transportable frescoes on double-curved synthetic surfaces which constitute a fragment of an imaginary architectural space. He has executed in 2004 the life "Portrait of Pope John Paul II" which is considered as one of the largest papal portraits in the world.

=== Oil paintings ===
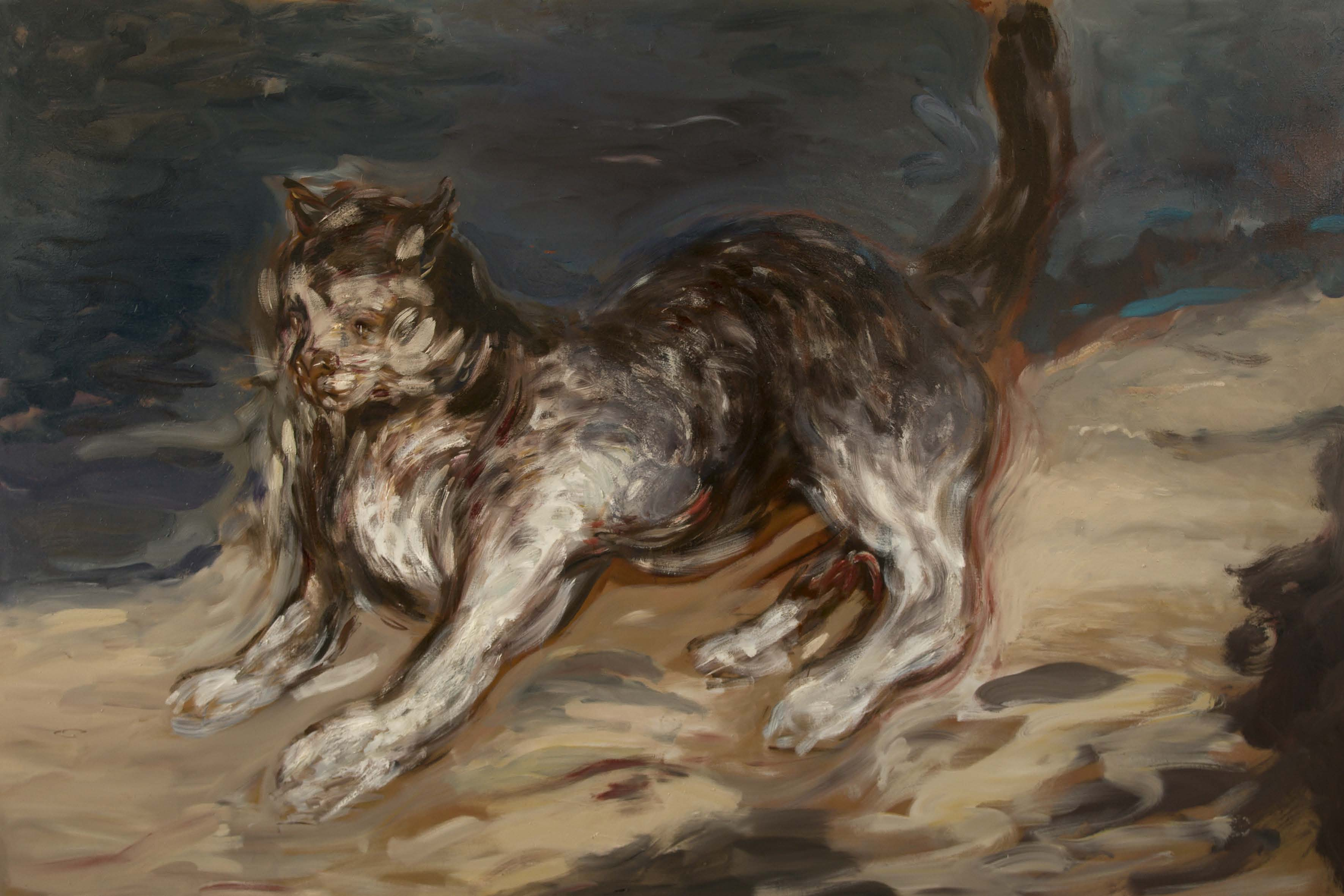
Fernando Leal Audirac, The Invisible Cat, 2009-2010 (oil on linen)

Two oil paintings that are central in his production are Image of the Absolute (1977–1991), which was exhibited in 1992 in the Frankfurter Kunstverein and The Shadow and the Night with which he participated in the Venice Biennale in 1995. Juan Acha, Jorge Juanes, Peter Weiermair and Pierre Restany have written extensively on these works.

=== Encaustic ===
This ancient Greek-Roman technique, revitalized by 20th century American artists such as Fernando Leal and Jasper Johns, has been central to Leal Audirac's research. In November 2010 he has exposed a new series of large format encaustics at Art Seefeld Galerie in Zürich. The Value of a Brushstroke and The Gardens of Erbaluce belong to this collection.

=== Egg tempera ===
Focusing on a synthesis between Western and Eastern traditions, Leal Audirac executed in 1994 the painterly-graphic work entitled The Finite Stream, a large format painting (2x20 m) in which he reconstructed the ancient technique of egg tempera by analyzing the Eastern graphic problem of Linearity from a Western painterly perspective.

=== Multimedia ===
Since 2008 he has been working on a multimedia project entitled The Invisible Cat, conceived around an imaginary painting inspired by Francisco de Goya. The project combines painting, sculpture, 3D animation and installations.

=== Design ===
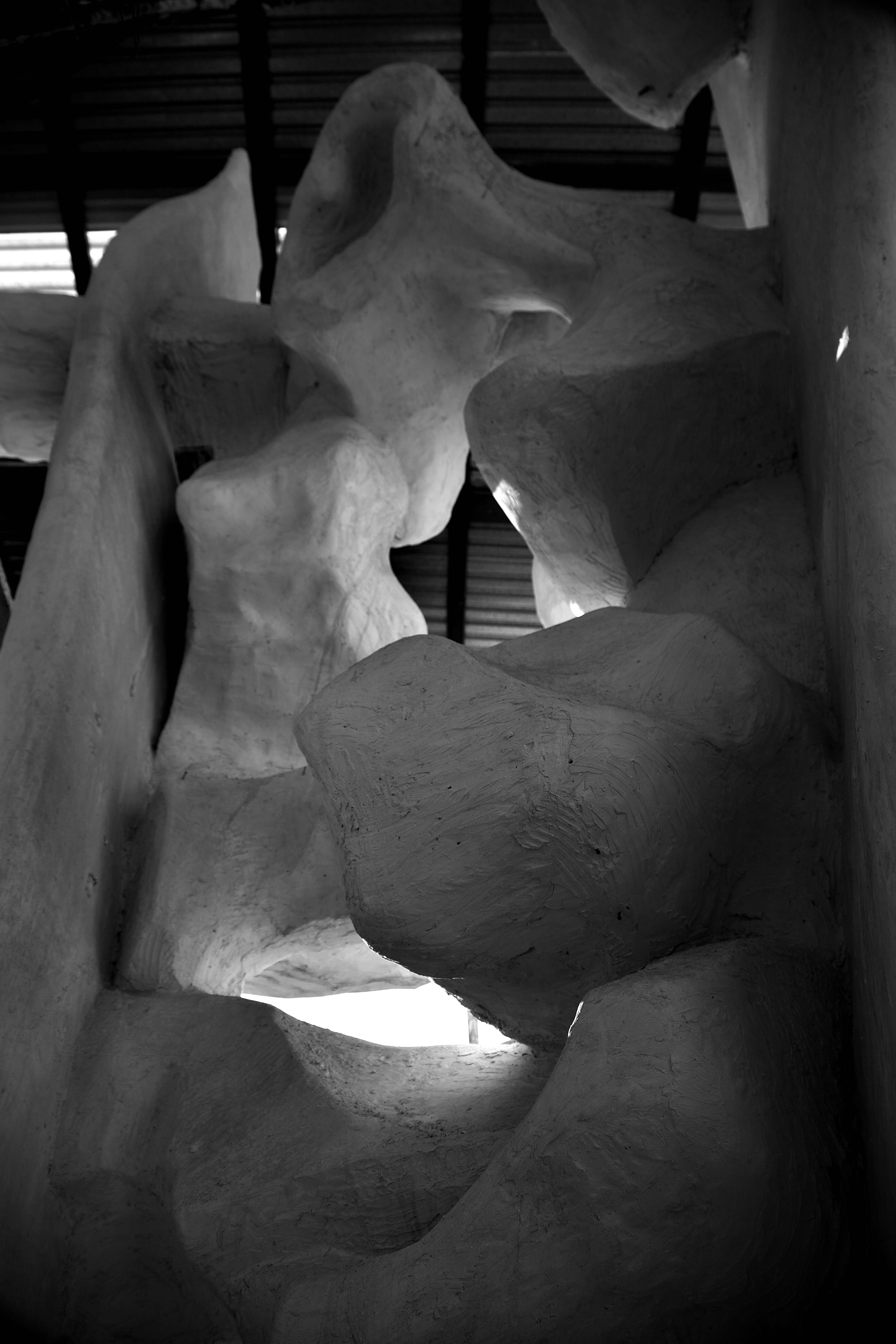
Ehécatl. 2014

He is also designer in the super-luxury car and yachting sector. In 2009 he executed a painterly intervention on the Catalan sportive car Tramontana R with a special type of metallic paint, enriched with gold and precious gems powder, making it one of the most expensive cars in the world. Based on the executive plans of the Tramontana car and of a yacht, he developed a series of mathematical sculptures, like The Golden Sea and Touch me that change color with light and the spectator's movements, shimmering from purple to cobalt blue and from gold to green.

=== Exhibitions ===
==== Personal Exhibitions (selected) ====
- 1986 Universidad Iberoamericana, Mexico City
- 1991 Galería de Arte Mexicano, Mexico City
- 1992 Galería Hakim Arte Actual, Mexico City
- 1993 Palacio de Bellas Artes, Mexico City
- 1994 José Luis Cuevas Museum, Mexico City
- 1995 Centro Culturale de México, Paris
- 1996 Galleria Manzoni, Milan
- 1997 Gallery M – 13, New York City
- 1998 Muzeul Naţional de Artă al României, Bucharest
- 1999 Centro per l'Arte Contemporanea della Rocca di Umbertide, Umbertide
- 2000 Howard Scott Gallery, New York City
- 2001 Civica Galleria d'arte moderna, Spoleto
- 2002 José Luis Cuevas Museum, Mexico City
- 2003 Max-Planck-Institut für Infektionsbiologie, Berlin
- 2004 Howard Scott Gallery, New York City
- 2008 Spazio Dante 14, Milan
- 2009 Galerie Art Seefeld, Zürich
- 2010 Galerie Art Seefeld, Zürich
- 2014 Galería Drexel, Monterrey
- 2017 Fundación Romo, Mexico City

==== Collective exhibitions (selected) ====
- 1992 Frankfurter Kunstverein, Frankfurt/Main
- 1993 Círculo de Bellas Artes, Madrid
- 1994 Galerie 1900 – 2000, Paris
- 1995 Art Multiple Fair, Düsseldorf
- 1996 Fiera d' Arte Bologna, Galeria Diagonal, Bologna
- 1997 ARCO Madrid, Galeria de Arte Mexicano, Madrid
- 1998 Palazzo Ducale, Genoa
- 1999 Spazio Montenero, Milan
- 2000 Galleria Arte 92, Milan
- 2001 Schloss Heidelberg, Heidelberg
- 2002 Galería Drexel, Monterrey, Mexico
- 2006 Fagus-Gropius Museum, Alfeld (Leine)
- 2007 Vittoriale, Gardone Riviera
- 2008 Castel S.Angelo, Rome
- 2013 Lo Studio Galerie, Buedingen
- 2014: Dallas Art Fair – Drexel Gallery, Dallas
- 2019: Emmegi Group Collection, Castello di Morsasco, Italy

=== Literature ===
==== Monographs ====
- Juan Acha: El antirretrato del Dr. Villanueva : ocho óleos de Fernando Leal Audirac- The Anti-Portrait of Dr. Villanueva. Eight oil paintings by Fernando Leal Audirac. Critical essay by Juan Acha. Galería de Arte Mexicano, Mexico 1991.
- Fernando Leal Audirac: Obra de 1975 a 1993. Texts by: Richard Brettell, Juan Acha, Jorge Juanes, Ernesto de la Peña, Alberto Híjar, Arturo González Cosío. Espejo de Obsidiana, Mexico 1993. ISBN 968-6258-32-9
- Fernando Leal Audirac: La stagione che rimane. Opere 1993–2003. Edited by Martina Corgnati. Texts by Martina Corgnati, Lorella Giudici, Marc Dachy, Gianluca Marziani and Jorge Juanes. Silvana Editoriale, Milan 2003. ISBN 9788882156428
- Fernando Leal Audirac: La monumentalidad de lo íntimo. Introductory essay by Gabriel Bernal Granados, UNAM-El Equilibrista, Mexico 2007. ISBN 978-9685011860

==== Exhibition catalogues ====
- Juan Acha: El museo del hombre. Fernando Leal Audirac. Galería de Arte Mexicano, Mexico 1992. El Museo del hombre (Libro, 1992) [WorldCat.org]
- Fernando Leal Audirac and Arturo González Cosío: El códice de la guerra invisible. Variacionessobre la pintura de Fernando Leal Audirac. = The codex of the invisible war. Poems inspired by Fernando Leal Audirac's paintings. Papelesprivados, Mexico 1993. ISBN 968665741X
- Fernando Leal Audirac: Sotto un cielo di piombo. Under a Leaden Sky. Texte von Pierre Restany, Richard Brettell, Juan Acha, Jorge Juanes, Alberto Híjar, Álvaro Medina, Ernesto de la Peña, Giuliano Serafini. Casa del Mantegna, Mantova 1994.
- Fernando Leal Audirac, Raimundo Sesma: Fernando Leal Audirac. Sesma. Casa del Mantegna, Mantova 1994.
- La Biennale di Venezia. Esposizione internazionale d' arte. [BV]. Teil 46 [11]. Text by Pierre Restany. Istituto Italo-Latino Americano. Roma 1995 (Biennale Venezia 11 June – 15 October 1995)
- Bruno Soleri, Fernando Leal Audirac: Fernando Leal Audirac. Galleria Manzoni, Milano 1996
- Martina Corgnati: Fernando Leal Audirac. Der Diskurs der Dinge. Signum, Heidelberg 1996 and Torhaus Galerie, Bundesverband Bildender Künstler E.V. Braunschweig 1999.
- Juan Acha: Recent Works by Fernando Leal Audirac. Galleria Manzoni, Milan 1996.
- Enrico Mascelloni: Fernando Leal Audirac. Recent Paintings. M-13 Gallery, New York 1997.
- Fernando Savater: Fernando Leal Audirac. Mexican Institute, Madrid 1997.
- Enrico Mascelloni: Fernando Leal Audirac. National Museum of Art, Bucarest 1998.
- Enrico Mascelloni: Leal o la modernità del sublime. Galleria Arte 92, Milan 1999.
- Enrico Mascelloni: Fernando Leal Audirac. Centro per l’Arte Contemporanea della Rocca di Umbertide, Umbertide 1999.
- Gerard Haggerty: Fernando Leal Audirac. Paintings 1997–2000. HS-Howard Scott Gallery, New York 2000.
- Martina Corgnati: Labyrinthos. Civica Galleria d'arte moderna, Spoleto 2001.
- José Luis Cuevas, Jorge Juanes, Lorella Giudici and Cristina Riestra: The Hall of Mirrors. Museo José Luis Cuevas, Mexico City 2002.
- Ron Allenberger: Thy Fearful Symmetry, Galerie Art Seefeld, Zürich 2010.

==== Works illustrated by Fernando Leal Audirac ====
- Arturo González Cosío: Micromitografías, Del Valle Ed., Mexico 1986.
- Ernesto de la Peña: Las estratagemas de Dios, Editorial Domés, Mexico 1988.ISBN 968-450067-X
- Arturo González Cosío: Ernesto de la Peña: Animales del mundo en proverbios. Selección y trad. Arturo González Cosío. Pról. Ernesto de la Peña. Del Valle Ed., Mexico 1992. ISBN 968-665736-3.
- Guillermo Samperio, : Anteojos para la abstracción. Cal y arena, Mexico 1994.ISBN 968-493-261-8
- Fernando Savater: Criaturas del aire. ABC, Madrid 1994.ISBN 978-8430605309
- Vicente Quirarte, : Tras la huella del niño centenario. Instituto Mexiquense de Cultura, Toluca (México) 1994. ISBN 968-484-181-7
- Enrique Fernández Ledesma: Nuevagalería de fantasmas. Ida y regreso al siglo XIX. Univ. Nac. Autónoma de México, Coord.de Humanidades, Dir.Gen.de Publ., México, D.F. 1. Aufl. 1995. ISBN 968-363773-6.
- Auro Bernardi: Buñuel. Le Mani, Milano 1999. ISBN 9788880121114
- Arturo González Cosío: Trece poemas y cuatro haikus de amor. Univ. Nac. Autónoma de México, Mexico 2004.
- Sergio Fernández: El Mediterráneo de Cervantes. Su juventud. Italia y Argel. Univ. Nac. Autónoma de México, Mexico, 2009. ISBN 9786074551969
