= Janise Yntema =

American painter (born 1962)

- Born: 1962 (age 63–64); New Jersey
- Education: Parsons School of Design, Art Students League of New York
- Known for: Encaustic painting

Janise Yntema (born March 29, 1962) is an American painter working in the ancient wax encaustic technique. Yntema was born in New Jersey and attended Parsons School of Design and the Art Students League of New York. She has had solo exhibitions in New York and throughout the United States as well as London, Amsterdam and Brussels. Her works are in the collections of several museums in Europe and the United States, including the Museum of Modern Art and Metropolitan Museum of Art.

She works and lives in Brussels, Belgium.

== Early life and education ==
Janise Yntema was born in 1962 in New Jersey. She attended St John the Divine Stoneyard Institute. Yntema studied at the Art Students League of New York in 1979. From 1980 to 1984, she studied at Parsons School of Design, where she received her Bachelor of Fine Arts. In 2020 she received a Master of Arts from the Paris School of History and Culture, University of Kent with a dissertation titled "ECOACTIVISM: Framing the Geopolitics of Contemporary Landscape and its Representation".

== Career ==
Her paintings are created from numerous layers of translucent applications of pigmented wax that are fused together with a blowtorch to create a smooth and glossy skin-like surface. Yntema has worked in marble dust, aluminum, iron powder, wood and wax. She said in 1996 that her body of work "makes reference towards figuration and landscape, but is abstracted and abbreviated to encompass the initial intensity of the physical gesture."

In 1991, Yntema edited Portrait of a Mile Square City: Stories from Hoboken, written by David Plakke. Yntema lives and works in Brussels, Belgium.

=== Exhibitions ===
Yntema has participated in more than 60 group exhibitions and had solo exhibits in New York, London, Amsterdam and Brussels. Some of her notable exhibitions are:

- 1993 - Solo exhibition, A.I.R. Gallery, New York City, NY
- 1994 - Williams Center for the Arts, Rutherford, New Jersey
- 1994 - The Definitive Decade - Aljira, a Center for Contemporary Art, Newark, NJ
- 1995 - New Jersey Arts Annual 1995 Fine Arts - Morris Museum, Morristown, NJ
- 1995 - City Without Walls 20th Anniversary Exhibition - City Without Walls (cWOW Gallery), Newark, NJ
- 1995 - Paintings and Constructions, solo exhibition - A.I.R. Gallery, New York City, NY
- 1996 - Slide presentation of her work, Westfield Community Room, Westfield, New Jersey.
- 1997 - Recent Work, solo exhibition - A.I.R. Gallery, New York City, NY
- 1997 - Mixed Media, Simon Gallery, New York
- 1998 - Mixed Media, Simon Gallery, New York
- 2010 - Fahrenheit 180: A Group Encaustic Exhibition, Ann Street Gallery, Newburgh, NY
- 2011 - Winter solo exhibition - Galerie Josine Bokhoven, Amsterdam
- 2012 - Beth Namenwirth & Janise Yntema - Galerie Josine Bokhoven, Amsterdam
- 2014 - Gothic Light- Libre Choix Cabinet Artistique, Bruxelles
- 2015 - The Temperature of Light, Kean University, Nancy Dryfoos Gallery, Union, New Jersey
- 2016 - Le Paysage Tranquille, Galerie Marie Demange, Brussels, Belgium
- 2017 - Depth Perception, Cape Cod Museum of Art, Dennis, MA
- 2018 - Truc Troc, BOZAR Centre for Fine Arts, Brussels, Belgium
- 2019 - "Praeter Terram" The Green Door Gallery, Bruxelles
- 2019 "Sense of Place: Landscape and Identity" Cadogan Contemporary, London, UK
- 2020 "Realist and Lyrical Landscape" The Scottish Gallery, Edinburgh

=== Collections ===
Yntema's work is included in the permanent collections of the following institutions:

- Amherst College, Amherst, MA
- Art Institute of Chicago, Chicago, IL
- Brooklyn Museum of Art, Library Collections, Brooklyn, NY
- Carnegie Institute Museum of Art, Pittsburgh, PA
- Cincinnati Museum of Art, Cincinnati, OH
- Fred Jones Jr. Museum of Art, Norman, OK
- Gutenberg Museum, Mainz, Germany
- Metropolitan Museum of Art, New York NY
- Milwaukee Arts Museum, Milwaukee, WI
- Museum of Modern Art, Library Collections, New York, NY
- National Museum for Women in the Arts, Washington, D.C.
- Provincetown Art Association and Museum, Provincetown, MA
- Stedelijk Museum, Amsterdam, the Netherlands
- Yale University Art Gallery, New Haven, CT
