= Bridgette Meinhold =

American artist

Bridgette Meinhold is an American artist and author of “Urgent Architecture: 40 Sustainable Housing Solutions for a Changing World.”

Meinhold is also the Architecture Editor for Inhabitat.com, and a contributing writer for Inhabitots.com and Ecouterre.com. She has written extensively about sustainable design innovation, eco architecture, green building.

== Early life and education ==
Bridgette Meinhold is originally from Oklahoma. In 2003, Meinhold earned a BS in mechanical engineering from San Diego State University in San Diego, CA. In 2007, she earned a Master of Science in Civil and environmental engineering with a focus on sustainability at Stanford University in Palo Alto, California.

Following college, Meinhold lived and worked in Germany and spent time in New York City.

== Career ==
=== Author ===
In 2013, W. W. Norton & Company, Inc., published Meinhold’s book, “Urgent Architecture: 40 Sustainable Housing Solutions for a Changing World.” The book features 40 emergency and long-term housing projects and was written in response to natural disasters, climate change, population growth, urbanization and poverty. It is organized in five categories — rapid shelters, transitional shelters, affordable housing, prefab housing, and adaptable housing — and includes examples from Bangladesh and Haiti to Malibu, CA and Milan, Italy.

All of the projects focus on green building, sustainable design, eco-friendly materials, affordability, material reuse, and humanitarian relief. Project construction methods and materials include repurposed shipping containers, straw bale construction, sandbag homes, and floating homes.

=== Freelance writer ===
Since, 2008, Meinhold has served as Architecture Editor for Inhabitat.com, “devoted to the future of design, tracking the innovations in technology, practices and materials that are pushing architecture and home design towards a smarter and more sustainable future.”

Meinhold is also a contributing writer for Inhabitots.com, which focuses on “sustainable design for the next generation.” Since 2009, Meinhold has been a contributing writer Ecouterre.com, for which she writes about sustainable fashion design.

=== Artist ===
Meinhold uses encaustic, milk paint, pencil, oil and watercolor to depict clouds, mountains, trees, the atmosphere, and inclement weather. Meinhold’s paintings are exhibited at Gallery MAR in Park City, UT, Diane West in Durango, CO, the Vickers Collection in Aspen, CO, and Vail Village Arts in Vail, CO.

Of her atmospheric paintings, Meinhold commented:

[My work] tends to be on that moody, sort of melancholy side, because the atmospheres that tend to create the most interest for me are not the blue days. Everybody can take a picture of a blue day, but fog to me is very interesting.

== Personal life ==
Meinhold resides in an A-frame cabin in Park City, Utah with her husband, a firefighter/paramedic who built an art studio for Meinhold out of an old 40-foot shipping container.
