= Heraclides (painter) =

Heraclides or Heracleides (Ancient Greek: Ἡρακλείδης) was a Macedonian painter, who was at first merely a marine painter of sea and ships, but afterwards acquired some distinction as a painter in encaustic. He lived in the time of Perseus, after whose fall he went to Athens (168 BC).
