= Michael David (painter) =

American painter

Michael David Singer
- Born: September 22, 1954 (age 71); Brooklyn, New York City, U.S.
- Known for: Painting, photography, installation sculpture
- Movement: Abstract Expressionism

Michael David, born Michael David Singer; born September 22, 1954, is an American painter. Born in Reno, Nevada, David's family relocated to Brooklyn, New York, where he was raised. He attended SUNY Fredonia for one year and in 1976 received a B.F.A. from Parson's School of Design. David is classified as an abstract painter, best known for his use of the encaustic technique, which incorporates pigment with heated beeswax. He is also known for his works in mixed-media figure painting, photography and environmental sculpture. His work is included in the permanent public collections of the Metropolitan Museum of Art, the Guggenheim Museum, the Jewish Museum in New York, the Museum of Contemporary Art in Los Angeles, and the Los Angeles County Museum of Art, among others.

== Plasmatics and late-1970s New York music scene ==
In 1976 David, erotic photographer Roy Stuart and Fredonia friend Richie Stotts formed a band called The Numbers, with David on bass. The group was a fixture in New York's early punk rock music scene, playing in clubs alongside punk pioneers Television, Blondie and the Ramones. David also played bass with punk innovators Jerry Nolan of The New York Dolls, Cheetah Chrome of The Dead Boys, Marky Ramone, Peter Gordon, David Van Tieghem and the free-improvisation noise music group Borbetomagus.

In 1977, The Numbers were approached by impresario Rod Swenson, who was seeking musicians to form a backing band for singer Wendy O. Williams, whose radical persona he sought to exploit as punk music and performance art. The Numbers became The Plasmatics and David left the band to pursue his painting career.

== Painting career ==
David's first one-man show was in 1981 at the Sidney Janis Gallery. That year he was awarded a Guggenheim Fellowship, at the time the youngest artist ever to do so, and in 1982 was awarded an American Academy of Arts and Letters prize. He went on to exhibit at galleries worldwide and was represented by Knoedler & Co. for the next 25 years.

David uses the encaustic technique of painting, which uses pigment combined with heated beeswax. David built his early career on abstraction and religious iconography, which formed the bulk of his output until 1999. Since then he has also experimented with representational painting and traditional photography.

In 2000, he developed the "Chortens" and "Populations" series, about which art historian and critic Donald Kuspit wrote: "They are enigmatic works, all the more so because of the way their innumerable details form singularly monumental, intimidating wholes. Dense yet delicate, awesome yet intimate, they convey the fragility as well as grandeur of sheer being. Layer upon layer of paint piles up like layer upon layer of coral, but the textural result is more epic, not to say startling, than any coral island, and virtually any other existing abstract expressionist painting (upon which they are stylistically founded)."

In 2001, David developed bi-lateral neuropathy due to being poisoned by gases released by overheated beeswax used in the encaustic process. The disease left him with partial paralysis of his legs, slowing the production of his painting for a number of years. That year, David began painting his "fallen Toreadors" series, inspired by 19th century French Realist painter Édouard Manet's "The Dead Toreador" of 1864. Of the series, David has said, "My work (became) about compassion. Compassion for those different from us, compassion for each other, and, most importantly, compassion for oneself, for a painter who was reckless enough to hurt himself doing what he loves most."

== Photography ==
In 1993, David experimented at the "20x24" Polaroid studio in Manhattan, which resulted in a series of portraits of playwright Edward Albee and of friend Jackie Gross, which would become the ongoing "Jackie" series of mixed-media works. When neuropathy rendered him unable to paint during 2003, he returned to the 20x24 camera and shot large-format Polaroids inspired by Caravaggio; nude men and women dressed as Toreadors, and religious imagery.

== Environmental sculpture - The Greenhouse Project ==
In 2002, David began to develop The Greenhouse Project, an evolving "architectural construct" based on historical American Antebellum greenhouses built using the actual glass negatives sold to starving farmers in the post-American Civil War South. David has indicated that each greenhouse will, through the display of photography and use of social networking, create a forum and exhibit for ideas and artifacts related to civil and human rights; the specifications of each greenhouse particular to the community in which each is built.

== Critical response ==
David's work was reviewed in Artforum and Art in America, and is considered one of the last links to the New York School of painting. Donald Kuspit characterized David’s paintings in the following essay:

Michael David’s abstract paintings renew immediacy, indeed, reconstitute, strengthen, and even apotheosize it. They raise it to a feverishly fresh intensity with their remarkable touch, indicating they are among the very best painterly abstractions made. To me they make it transparently clear that immediacy may be an illusion to the intellect but it is not one for the senses—for touch and sight, mingled together inextricably in ecstatic perception. For them, painterly immediacy is ultimate reality: pure sensuous intensity transcendent of ordinary, habitual understanding of the world, which is mediated by socially sanctioned language and banal meanings that force sense experience into their procrustean bed.

— Donald Kuspit

Kuspit has also described David's work as follows:

David may be the most innovative master of immediate surface since the abstract expressionists. He has acknowledged his debt to Abstract Expressionism, but he has transformed it. Where the abstract expressionist paintings of the forties and fifties seem like modern cave paintings, as their crude, unfocused, often meandering, turbulent painterliness suggests, and as such to reinstate prehistory, David seems to turn the cave into a temple, as his more considered, concentrated, indeed, dense, contemplative painterliness indicates, so that his paintings have the aura of post history. The sublime is gained with no loss of force—no sacrifice of painterly dynamics. Indeed, there is a gain in the sense of bodiliness: each of his works has a certain “body”—density of presence—so that it seems to embody the sublime, not simply evoke it. His paintings make the abstract sublime vividly concrete, as though it could be grasped rather than existed as some numinous beyond.

— Donald Kuspit
