= Fritz Faiss =

German-American painter (1905-1981)

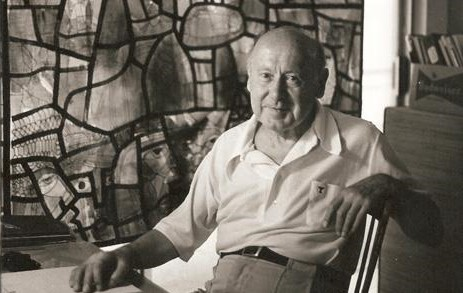
- Faiss with his painting, Christmas Window (1971)
- Born: Fritz Wilhelm Faiss; March 6, 1905; Furtwangen, Germany
- Died: October 1, 1981 (aged 76); Los Angeles, California
- Education: Staatliches Bauhaus, State Academy of Fine Arts Stuttgart
- Known for: Encaustic painting
- Movement: Abstract expressionism
- Spouse: Janet Wullner
- Awards: Prix de Rome

Fritz Wilhelm Faiss (March 6, 1905 – October 1, 1981) was a German-American abstract expressionist artist.

== Early life and education ==
Faiss was born on March 6, 1905, in the town of Furtwangen, a town in the Black Forest section of Germany. He studied at the Bauhaus, where he was influenced by various artists including Paul Klee and Wassily Kandinsky, as well as the Stuttgart Academy of Fine Arts. He also had training as a medical doctor.

== Career ==
Faiss flourished in his art and teaching until the Nazis took power, and thereafter he was viewed by the German government as a degenerate artist. He was harassed by the Gestapo and forbidden to work as an artist, and much of his artwork was destroyed. Eventually he was sent by the Nazis to a forced labor camp, where he spent about a year and became very sick. After the war, he returned to his art and teaching.

In 1951, he emigrated to the United States, where he settled in Pasadena, California. He became renowned for his hot wax artwork known as encaustic painting, but he also became an expert painter using many other methods including monotypes, water colors, tempera, lithography, woodcuts, stained glass, and line drawings. Much of his art has biblical, mythological, and mystical themes. He taught at UCLA and Otis Art Institute and eventually became a tenured professor of art at California State University, Northridge, where he retired as professor emeritus in 1973. His artwork has been installed and exhibited throughout the world, including France, Italy, Germany, England, and the United States.

== Personal life and death ==
Faiss was married to Janet Wullner until his death in 1981 at the age of 76.

== Publications ==
- Faiss, Fritz. Lenticle: two interviews with Fritz Faiss. Valencia Hills (Saugus, Calif.) : Green Hut Press, 1972.
- Faiss, Fritz. Hackney jade and the war-horse. Valencia Hills, Calif. : Green Hut Press, 1977.
- Faiss, Fritz. The blue glass Napoleon. Northridge, Calif. : Art Dept. Gallery, San Fernando Valley State College, 1964.
- Faiss, Fritz. Concerning the way of color : an artist's approach. Valencia Hills, Calif. : Green Hut Press, 1977.
- Faiss, Fritz. Out of loneliness. Saugus, Calif. : Green Hut Press, 1972.
- Faiss, Fritz. Fritz Wilhelm Faiss : artist file : study photographs and reproductions of works of art with accompanying documentation 1920-2000. Frick Art Reference Library, 2000.
- Faiss, Fritz. Modern art and man's search for the self. Saugus, Calif. : Green Hut Press, 1974.
- Faiss, Fritz. Fritz Faiss, retrospective exhibition featuring the Big Sur and Cambria Pines Series : Palm Springs Desert Museum : 23 March 1963. Palm Springs, Calf. : Palm Springs Desert Museum, 1963.
- Faiss, Fritz, and Hilldebrandt, Hans. Fritz Faiss, Gesamtschau 1947 : Pforzheim, vom 3. Juni-2. Juli, in den Räumen der Militärregierung. Pforzheim : 1947.

== Awards ==
- 1935: Prix de Rome
- 1952: Huntington Hartford Foundation Fellowship
