= John K. Lawson (artist) =

British-American artist

John K. Lawson aka JKL (born 1962 in Birmingham, England) is an American Contemporary visual artist and poet, also known as the "Hieronymus Bosch of Beads," and is known for using salvaged Mardi Gras beads and items reclaimed from the destruction left by Hurricane Katrina in his art.

== Early life and career ==
John K. Lawson was born in Birmingham, U.K. and grew up in London, and Plymouth, England. His family moved to South London when he was in his early teens. He first came to America as part of a student exchange program in engineering at Louisiana State University in Baton Rouge. At the program, his artistic abilities were encouraged, and two years later he returned to England to concentrate on landscape painting. His work was successfully exhibited at the White Lane Gallery, Plymouth, England. Later, Lawson returned to the United States, and soon became part of an underground art culture in New Orleans that included working in tattoo, T-shirt and mural designs. Lawson also became known for his unique drawing style and creations using discarded Mardi Gras beads. The items he has covered with intricate bead work include mannequins, pianos, and drums, as well as a fifty-three-foot-long bar top at the Audubon Hotel. Some of the pieces focus on jazz musicians and historical figures from New Orleans' history.

== Hurricane Katrina ==
Lawson's collection of beads were among the few possessions that survived the destruction of Hurricane Katrina (August 2005). He and his wife, Aimee (who is the cousin of author Andre Dubus III), lost their home and his adjacent art studio to the storm. Before Hurricane Katrina, Lawson’s primary medium were his trade mark Mardi Gras beads, picked up from the streets on mornings after the parades and parties New Orleans is famous for. After Hurricane Katrina, he began creating series of palimpsests, using drawings, sketches, photographs and personal documents collected over 25 years, which he had salvaged from his flood damaged New Orleans home and studio, and began recycling them combining xerox, ink and the encaustic process. Buildings damaged by flood waters post-Hurricane Katrina became the subject of a series of architectural photographs, including the Western Union Building and the Maritime Building in New Orleans.

== Mardi Gras Made in China ==
In 2004 John K. Lawson was featured in the documentary film, which follows the story of Mardi Gras beads from their manufacture in factories in China, to their use at Mardi Gras parades, and their transition in the hands of John K. Lawson into fine art pieces hanging in New York galleries. The LA Times wrote of the movie: "Cleverly juxtaposes the apex of American bacchanalian excess with the sweatshop-like conditions that facilitate the fun." The film earned 21 national and international awards, including a nomination for the Grand Jury Award at the Sundance Film Festival, and was a New York Times' "Critics Pick" by Stephen Holden.

== Hurricane Hotel and illuminated art books ==
The loss of Lawson's home and studio in Hurricane Katrina (while living in New Orleans, Summer 2005) along with 25 years of art work and writing is the focus of his 2007 novel, Hurricane Hotel and his two full length poetry collections; Now and A Map of Sorts. His two previous illuminated art books, Figures in Jazz and Maker Rebirth, combine his poetry and visual art in provocative dialogue.

== Swamp Blues Men ==
His newest illuminated book, Swamp Blues Men, is a collaboration with the historical West Baton Rouge museum in Louisiana and features collage portraits and poems along with leading historical backgrounds on some of the musical legends who shaped modern music and is scheduled for release October 2019.

== Poetry Publications ==
Lawson's art and poetry are published regularly in the Berkshire Edge and Country Roads in the USA. Lawson's third collection of poems, Zombie Love, has a release date of January 2020, with the final touches being added on Bodmin Moor.

== Artist Residencies ==
In 2016 and 2017 he collaborated with students from the Plymouth School of Art and Design on a piece commemorating the Plymouth 2020. John is currently living in South Louisiana where he also recently finished two years as the artist in residence at the newly opened Knock Knock Children’s Museum in Baton Rouge, where 350,000 museum visitors worked with his creative practice.

== Works ==
- "Dr. John", Los Angeles County Museum
- "Garden of Unearthly Delights," 53-foot-long bar-top installation for the Audubon Hotel, New Orleans.
- "Give Peace a Chance" Mural on Magazine Street, in memory of Ivory Sims, 11, who was killed during a drive-by shooting, 1993. (Mural destroyed during Hurricane Katrina)
- "High on Life," American Visionary Art Museum, Baltimore Maryland
- Hurricane Hotel (novel).
- "Just Another Day on the Floating Clock" Mural. The Bayou Bar, Baton Rouge Louisiana 1982 (Destroyed during Hurricane Katrina)
- "The Temptation Piano" on permanent exhibit at the American Visionary Arts Museum, Baltimore, Maryland.
- The Brennan "Jazz" Piano, at the Flambeaux Restaurant, Disneyland, California.

== Exhibitions ==
- NOW AND THEN Honfleur gallery, Washington D.C. March—April 2010.
- FRAGILE Honfleur gallery, Washington D.C. November 15, 2008 – January 2, 2009.
- INTERSECTIONS The American Poetry Museum - Washington, DC. November 2008.
- TEMPEST Santa Fe Art Institute, August 2007. Funded by an Emergency Relief Grant sponsored by the Pollack-Krasner Foundation.

== Collaborations and Residencies ==
- 2016–2017 collaboration with students from the Plymouth School of Art and Design on a piece commemorating the Plymouth 2020.
- 2017–2018, artist in residence at the Knock Knock Children’s Museum in Baton Rouge.

== Poetry Collections and Publications ==
- Hurricane Hotel, novel, 2007
- Now, full length poetry collection
- A Map of Sorts, full length poetry collection
- Figures in Jazz, art illuminated book combining Lawson's poetry and visual art
- Maker Rebirth, art illuminated book combining Lawson's poetry and visual art
- Swamp Blues Men illuminated book, in collaboration with the West Baton Rouge Museum in Louisiana, featuring collage portraits and poems, and historical backgrounds on some of the musical legends who shaped modern music. Scheduled for release October 2019.
- Zombie Love, collection of poems, release date January 2020.
- Berkshire Edge (USA), regularly publishes Lawson's art and poetry
- Country Roads (USA), regularly publishes Lawson's art and poetry
