= Encaustic painting =

Painting technique

A 6th-century encaustic icon from Saint Catherine's Monastery, Egypt, depicting Peter the Apostle

Encaustic painting, also known as hot wax painting, is a form of painting that involves a heated wax medium to which colored pigments have been added. The molten mix is applied to a surface –usually prepared wood, though canvas and other materials are sometimes used. The simplest encaustic medium could be made by adding pigments to wax, though recipes most commonly consist of beeswax and damar resin, potentially with other ingredients. For pigmentation, dried powdered pigments can be used, though some artists use pigmented wax, inks, oil paints or other forms of pigmentation.

Metal tools and special brushes can be used to shape the medium as it cools. Also, heated metal tools, including spatulas, knives and scrapers, can be used to manipulate the medium after it has cooled onto the surface. Additionally, heat lamps, torches, heat guns, and other methods of applying heat are used by encaustic artists to fuse and bind the medium. Because encaustic medium is thermally malleable, the medium can be also sculpted, and materials can be encased, collaged or layered into the medium.

A completely unrelated type of "encaustic painting", not involving wax at all, is found in British ceramics, after Josiah Wedgwood devised and patented the technique in 1769. This was a mixture of ceramic slip and overglaze "enamel" paints used to imitate ancient Greek vase painting, and given a light second firing. Usually the vessel was black and painted in the red of red-figure painting. The technique was copied by other British potteries. Encaustic tiles are not painted at all, but effectively inlaid with contrasting colours of clay for a polychrome pattern.

== History ==
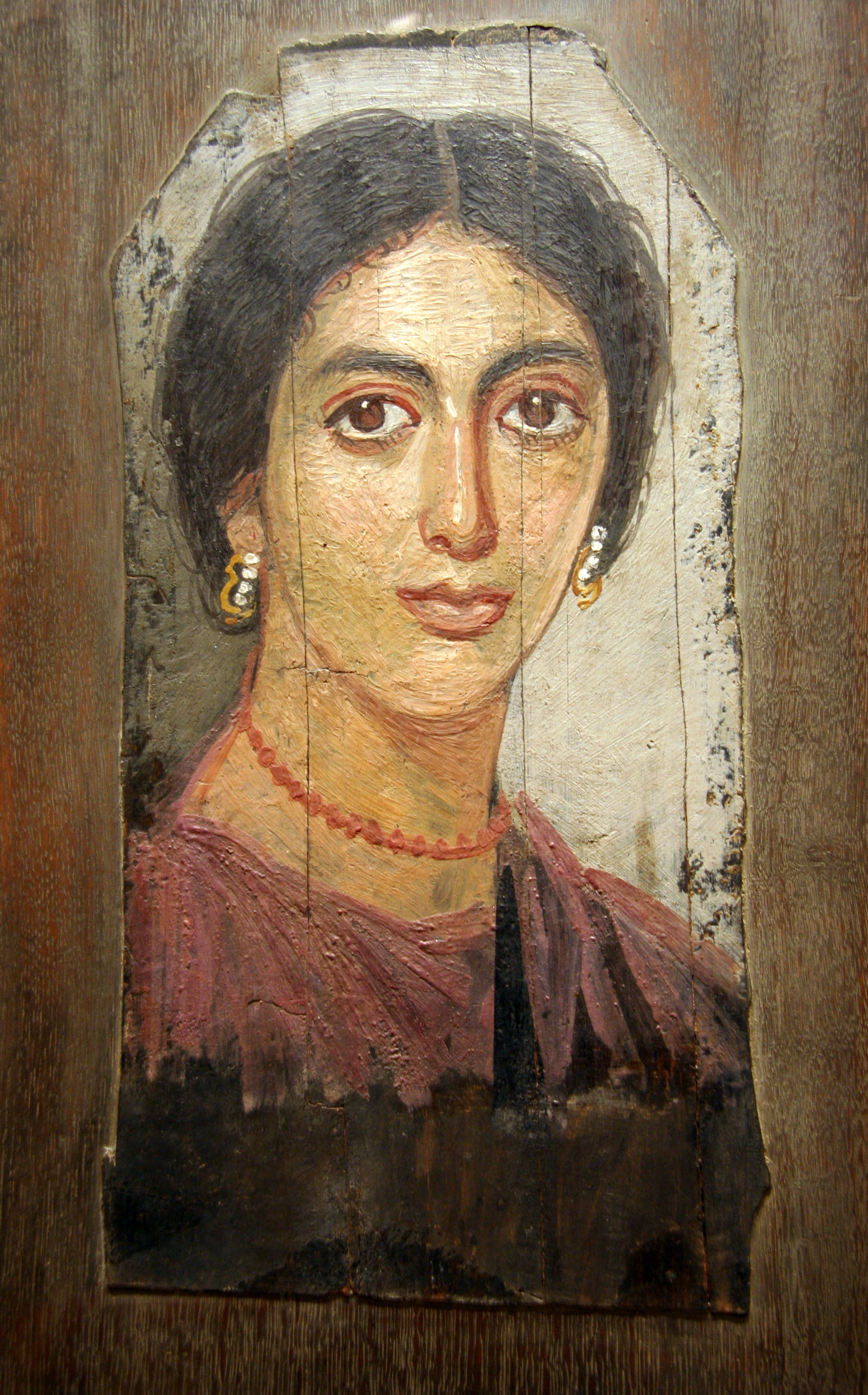
Fayum mummy portrait

Encaustic painting was developed by the ancient Greeks and reached its highest level of technical mastery through the work of the genre painter Pausias in the 4th century BCE.

The word encaustic originates from Ancient Greek: ἐγκαυστικός, which means "burning in", from ἐν en, "in" and καίειν kaiein, "to burn", and this element of heat is necessary for a painting to be called encaustic. Encaustice or Encaustike (ἐγκαυστική) was the art of painting by burning in the colours.

The wax encaustic painting technique was described by the Roman scholar Pliny the Elder in his Natural History from the 1st Century. The oldest surviving encaustic panel paintings are the Romano-Egyptian Fayum mummy portraits from Egypt, around 100–300, but it was a very common technique in ancient Greek and Roman painting. It continued to be used in early Byzantine icons but was effectively abandoned in the Western Church.

Kut-kut, a lost art of the Philippines, employs sgraffito and encaustic techniques. It was practiced by the Waray people of Samar from 1600 to 1800. Artists in the Mexican muralism movement, such as Diego Rivera, Fernando Leal (artist) and Jean Charlot sometimes used encaustic painting. The Belgian artist James Ensor also experimented with encaustic.

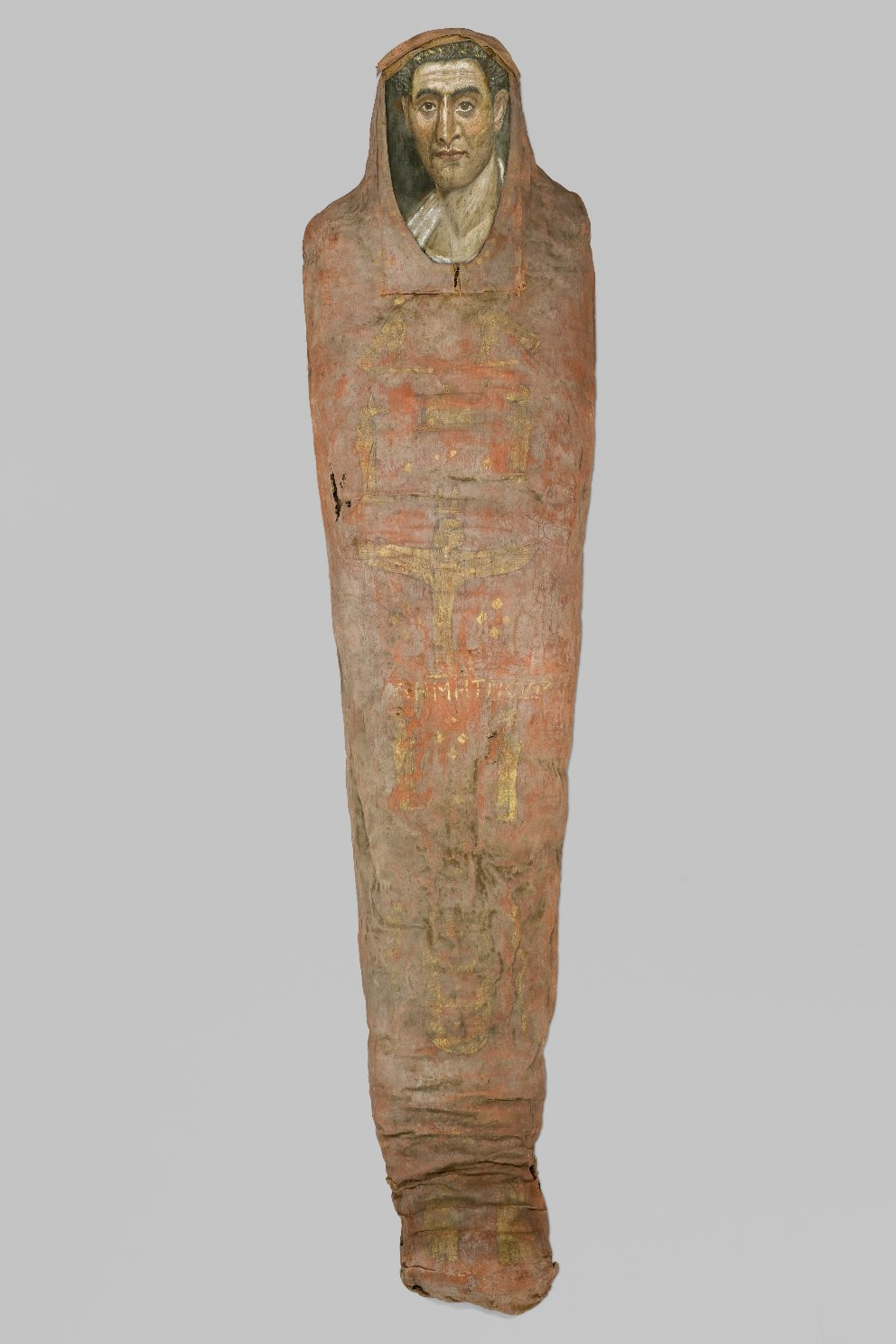
The Mummy of Demetrios, 95–100 C.E.,11.600a-b, Brooklyn Museum

In the 20th century, painter Fritz Faiss (1905–1981), a student of Paul Klee and Wassily Kandinsky at the Bauhaus, together with Dr. Hans Schmid, rediscovered the so-called Punic wax technique of encaustic painting. Faiss held two German patents related to preparing waxes for encaustic painting. One covered a method for treating beeswax to raise its melting point from 60 to 100 °C (140 to 212 °F). This occurred after boiling the wax in a seawater and soda solution three successive times. The resulting harder wax is the same as the Punic wax referred to in ancient Greek writings on encaustic painting. Other 20th-century North American artists, including Jasper Johns, Tony Scherman, Mark Perlman, John Shaw and Fernando Leal Audirac, have used encaustic techniques.

Encaustic art has seen a resurgence in popularity since the 1990s, with artists using electric irons, hotplates and heated styli on different surfaces, including card, paper, and even pottery, and wax crayons started to be used as an inexpensive and accessible medium for crafting and art education. The iron makes producing a variety of artistic patterns easier. The medium is not limited to just simple designs; it can also be used to create complex paintings, just as in other media such as oil and acrylic. Although technically difficult to master, attractions of this medium for contemporary artists are its dimensional quality and luminous color.

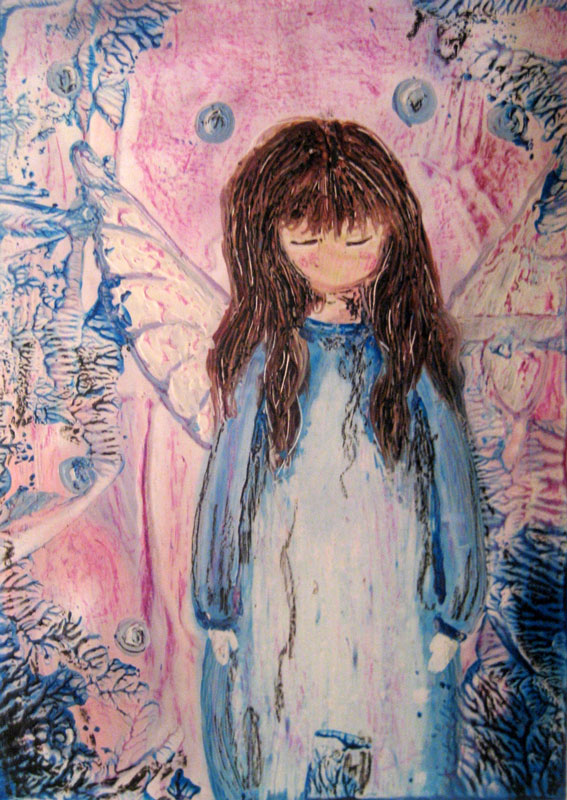
A modern-day encaustic painting using wax crayons, Martina Loos, 2009.

== Encaustic painters ==
Artists specializing in encaustic painting include the following:

- Fernando Leal Audirac
- Benjamin Calau
- Rodney Carswell
- José María Cano
- Pedro Cuni-Bravo
- Michael David
- Christel Dillbohner
- Thomas Dodd
- Betsy Eby
- Fritz Faiss
- Esther Geller
- Heraclides
- Jasper Johns
- John K. Lawson
- Bridgette Meinhold
- Pausias
- Michele Ridolfi
- Jenny Sages
- Tony Scherman
- Amanta Scott
- Janise Yntema
- Karl Zerbe

== See also ==
- Encaustic tile
