= Pedro Cuni-Bravo =

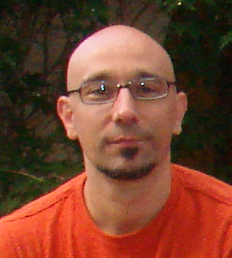
- Pedro Cuni-Bravo, July 2008
- Born: Pedro Cuni-Bravo
- Occupation: Artist
- Years active: 1980–present

Pedro Cuni-Bravo is a Spanish artist living in New York City, specializing in murals, portraits and encaustic and oil paintings. He teaches in Parsons School of Design and the Cooper Union.

== Frescoes ==
- New York City University, Trenton, State Government Building
- St. James Theatre
