= Ernesto de la Peña =

Mexican writer, translator and cultural advocate

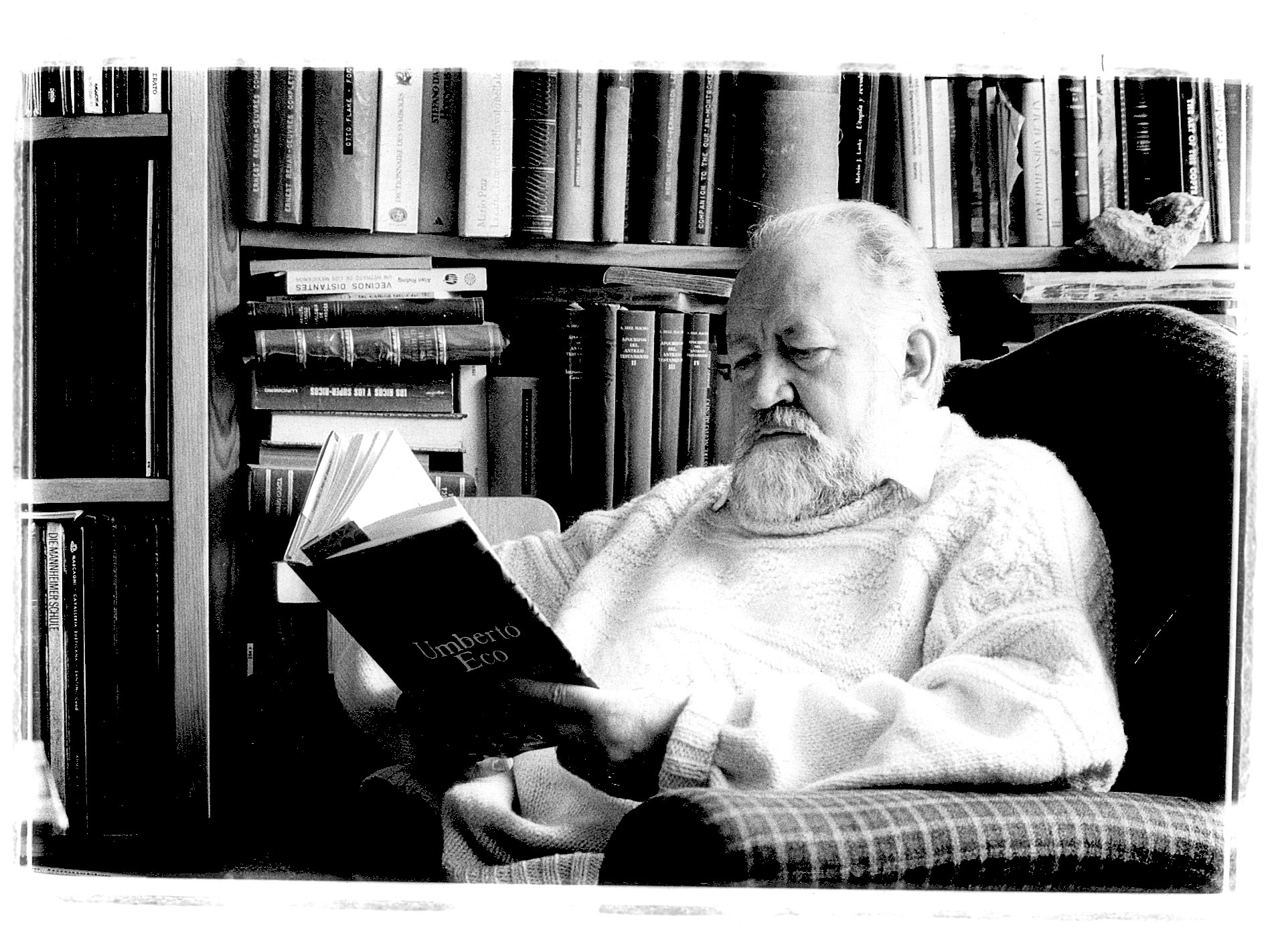
- Born: 21 November 1927; Mexico City, Mexico
- Died: 10 September 2012 (aged 84); Mexico City, Mexico
- Education: School of Philosophy and Letters, UNAM
- Occupations: Linguist, writer, polygraph
- Writing career
- Language: Spanish
- Notable awards: National Prize for Arts and Sciences (2003); Alfonso Reyes International Prize (2008); Menéndez Pelayo International Prize (2012); Belisario Domínguez Medal of Honor (2012)

Ernesto de la Peña (Spanish pronunciation: [eɾˈnesto ðe la ˈpeɲa]; 21 November 1927 – 10 September 2012) was a Mexican writer, translator and cultural advocate. De la Peña was also a polyglot who studied thirty-three languages, including Latin, Greek, Hebrew and Sanskrit. He joined the Mexican Academy of the Language in 1993 and was a member of the Royal Spanish Academy.

He studied classical literature at the National Autonomous University of Mexico (UNAM). His most famous books included The Stratagems of God, published in 1988; The Indelible Borrelli Case in 1992; Mineralogy For Intruders in 1999; and The Transfigured Rose, also released in 1999.

De la Peña was the recipient of the National José Pagés Llergo Prize for Cultural Journalism, the National Prize for Arts and Sciences for linguistics in 2003, and the Fine Arts Gold Medal in 2007. In August 2012, Mexican Ambassador to Spain Francisco Javier Ramírez Acuña accepted the Menéndez Pelayo International Prize on Ernesto de la Peña's behalf, as the writer was too ill to travel to Menéndez Pelayo International University in Santander, Spain, to accept it in person. He received the Belisario Domínguez Medal of Honor, Mexico's highest honor, in a post mortem ceremony in 2012.

Ernesto de la Peña died of an illness in Mexico City on 10 September 2012, at the age of 84.

== Works ==
=== Short Story ===
- Las estratagemas de Dios - Domés (1988)
- Las máquinas espirituales - Diana (1991)

=== Novel ===
- El indeleble caso de Borelli - Siglo XXI (1991).

=== Poetry ===
- Palabras para el desencuentro - CONACULTA (2005)
- Poemas invernales - Alfaguara (2015)

=== Essay ===
- Kautilya, o el Estado como mandala - CONACULTA (1993)
- El centro sin orilla - CONACULTA (1997)
- Las controversias de la fe. Los textos apócrifos de Santo Tomás - Aguilar (1997)
- La rosa transfigurada - FCE (1999)
- Don Quijote: la sinrazón sospechosa - CONACULTA (2005)
- Castillos para Homero - CONACULTA (2009)
- Carpe risum. Inmediaciones de Rabelais, FCE (2015)

Awards
Preceded by Cuauhtémoc Cárdenas	Recipient of the Belisario Domínguez Medal of Honor; 2012	Succeeded by Manuel Gómez Morín
