= Ramón Alva de la Canal =

Mexican painter and educator (1892–1985)

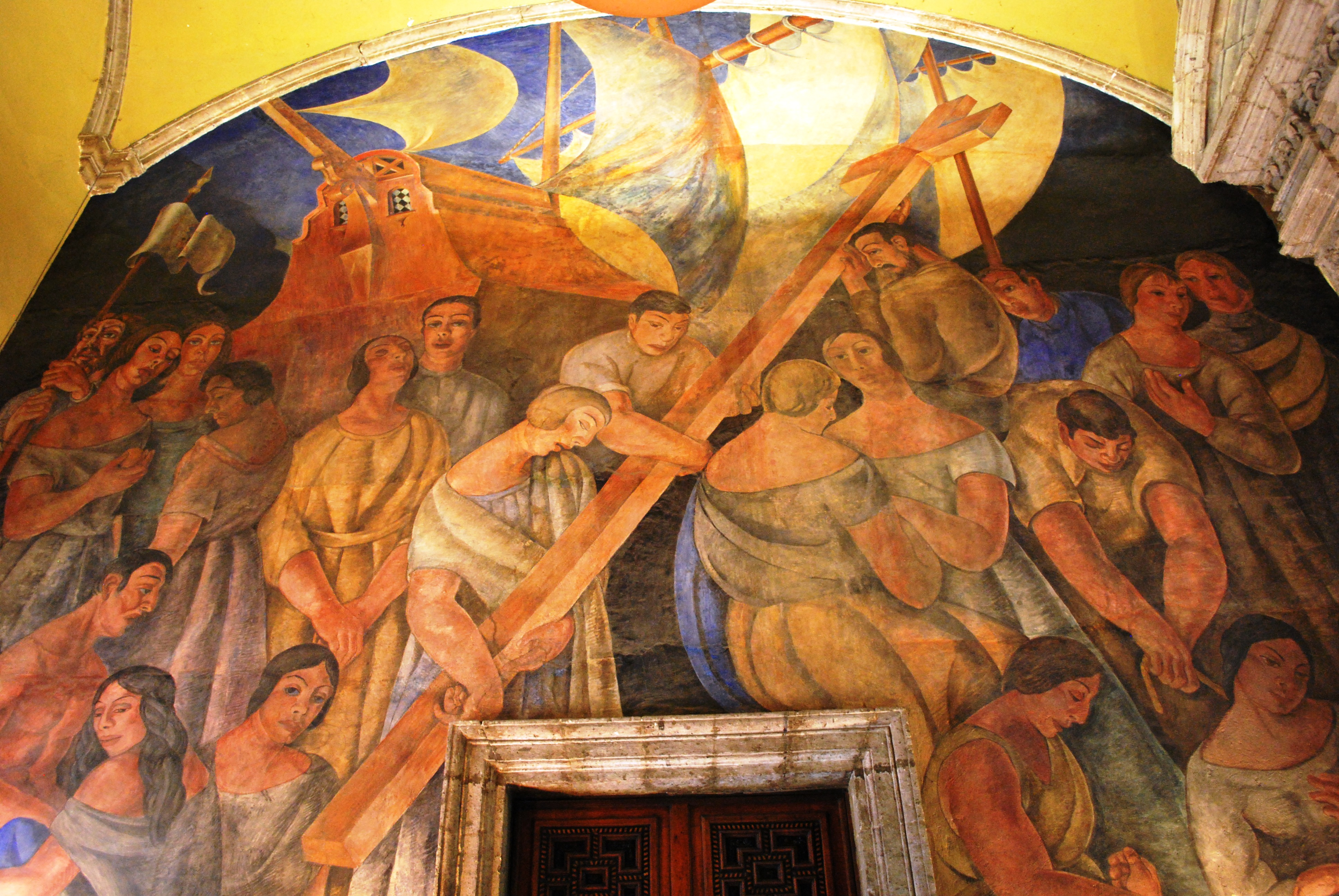
- El desembarco de los españoles y la cruz plantada en tierras nuevas at the College of San Ildefonso
- Born: August 29, 1892; Mexico City
- Died: April 4, 1985 (aged 92); Mexico City
- Education: Academia de San Carlos
- Known for: painting, illustrations, panel painting, scenic painting
- Movement: Mexican Muralism, Stridentism

Ramón Alva de la Canal (August 29, 1892 – April 4, 1985) was a Mexican painter, illustrator, and educator, one of the pioneers of the Mexican muralism movement.

He was born Ramón Pascual Loreto José Alva de la Canal on August 29, 1892, in the Tacubaya, now a neighborhood of Mexico City. He received his artistic training at the Academy of San Carlos and then at the Escuela de Pintural al Aire Libre in Coyoacán under Alfredo Ramos Martínez. He fought in the Mexican Revolution along with Dr. Atl and José Clemente Orozco.

During his career, he was a muralist, engraver, illustrator, theatre director and teacher. He began by joining the Sindicato de Obreros Técnicos, Pintores, Escultores y Grabadores (Technical workers, Painters, Sculptors and Engravers Union) in 1923 which had been convened by José Vasconcelos.

Most of Alva's work was related to political and cultural movements, beginning with cultural initiatives from the Secretary of Education José Vasconcelos. He was a member of the Stridentist Movement with Leopoldo Mendez and Fermin Revueltas between 1921 and 1926, illustrating many of the publications of that movement. In 1928, he was one of the founding members of the Grupo Revolucionario de Pintores 30-30 along with Fermín Revueltas, Fernando Leal, Gabriel Fernández Ledesma and Cuban Martí Casanovas, which was linked to the Escuelas de Pinturas al Aire Libre movement.

He was one of the pioneers of the Mexican muralism movement, especially frescos, recruited by Vasconcelos along with other muralists such as Diego Rivera, David Alfaro Siqueiros, José Clemente Orozco, Jean Charlot, Fernando Leal, Fermín Revueltas, Emilio García Cahero, Xavier Guerrero and Carlos Mérida. He created the first fresco of the 20th century in Mexico in 1922 with El desembarco de la cruz at the San Ildefonso College. He painted four murals for the Secretaría de la Defensa Nacional called La paz, La Guerra, El dolor Humano and La Victoria. His largest and most important work was fifty-six fresco panels at the monument to José María Morelos in Janitzio, Michoacán in 1938 along with an artist called Pepe Díaz. He painted an unfinished mural called La justicia y la justicia at the law school of the Universidad Metropolitana Xalapa in 1938. In Coyuca de Catalán, Guerrero, he painted a mural called La enseñanza, but it disappeared when an earthquake destroyed the school it was painted on.

In addition to mural work he is noted for other artistic endeavors. In 1922 he learned woodcut from Jean Charlot His first work of this type was a cover for the book Plebe by Germán List Arzubide in 1925. Most of his engraving work was related to his political activities. He later taught these skills same at the Centros de Pintura Populares. In 1932, he created a theatre group at the Palacio de Bellas Artes with Germán Cueto, Lola Cueto and Roberto Lago and became head of the Children's Theater department of the Secretaría de la Educación Pública in 1934. He also taught at the Escuela Nacional de Bellas Artes and at a middle school. At the end of the 1950s, he was the head of the Escuela de Artes Plásticas in Xalapa. He helped to revive puppet theatre in Mexico, managing a theater with his two sisters and was also noted for his portrait painting.

His work depicted cities in a positive manner, as places where people can reach their maximum potential as people have access to technology and away from rural life. He stated, "To understand or make art, what is required above all is sensitivity, spiritual delicacy, a certain nervous conformation and the will to embrace it."

In 1981 he became a member of the Academia de Artes of Mexico.

He died of a heart attack at age 92 in Mexico City on April 4, 1985.

In 1989 Javier Audirac filmed a documentary about him.
