= Manuel Maples Arce =

Mexican writer and diplomat (1900–1981)

Manuel Maples Arce (May 1, 1900 - June 26, 1981) was a Mexican poet, writer, art critic, lawyer and diplomat, especially known as the founder of the Stridentism movement.

== The leader of the first Mexican avant-garde movement ==
After the first Stridentist manifesto, Comprimido estridentista, launched in 1921 in the first issue of the broadsheet Actual, he published in 1922 his first avant-gardist book of poetry, Andamios interiores (Poemas radiograficos), that Jorge Luis Borges reviewed the same year; in 1924, Urbe (Super-poema bolchevique en 5 cantos), and an English version, made by John Dos Passos, was published in 1929 in New York (perhaps the first book of Mexican poetry, and the first of the Spanish language avant-garde, translated into English); in 1927, Poemas interdictos, his ultimate book of poetry for a long time, until the last one, Memorial de la sangre published in 1947.

During his stridentist period (from 1921 to 1927, first in Mexico City, then in Xalapa, Veracruz), he was responsible for the magazines Actual (3 issues in 1921 and 1922) and Irradiador (3 issues in 1923), followed by Horizonte (1926–1927) directed by his colleague German List Arzubide.

Around Maples Arce, poets such as German List Arzubide, Salvador Gallardo and Kyn Taniya (Luis Quintanilla's pen name), novelists such as Arqueles Vela, and artists such as Fermin Revueltas, the French native Jean Charlot, German Cueto, Leopoldo Méndez, Ramon Alva de la Canal, among others, can be referred to as the most important members of the Stridentist movement, which maintained good relations with the Mexican Muralism of Diego Rivera.

Maples Arce served as an ambassador to Norway in the 1960s.

== Posterity ==
After the scandalous life of the Stridentist group, for a long time Maples Arce was relatively despised by Mexican criticism as a poet, and very few specialists were interested in the study of Stridentist art and literature, which are now better known.

So it was an almost completely forgotten writer that the young Roberto Bolaño interviewed in 1976. He is referred to as a former avant-gardist poet in Bolaño's novel Los detectives salvajes (1998), in which he appears as a character.

== Bibliography ==
=== Spanish editions ===
- A la orilla de este río, Madrid, Editorial Plenitud, 1964.
- Andamios interiores (Poemas radiograficos), Mexico City, Editorial Cultura, 1922.
- Antología de la poesía mexicana moderna, Rome, Poligráfica Tiberina, 1940.
- Ensayos japoneses, Mexico City, Editorial Cultura, 1959.
- El arte mexicano moderno, London, Zwemmer, 1945.
- El paisaje en la literatura mexicana, Mexico City, Librería Porrúa, 1944.
- Incitaciones y valoraciones, Mexico City, Cuadernos Mexicanos, 1957.
- Las semillas del tiempo : obra poética, 1919-1980 [1981], foreword by Rubén Bonifaz Nuño, Xalapa, Universidad Veracruzana, 2013.
- Memorial de la sangre, Mexico City, Talleres Gráficos de la Nación, 1947.
- Mi vida por el mundo, Xalapa, Universidad Veracruzana, 1983.
- Poemas interdictos, portrait of author by Leopoldo Méndez, Xalapa, Ediciones de Horizonte, 1927.
- Peregrinación por el arte de México, Buenos Aires, Imprenta López, 1952.
- Rag (Tintas de abanico), Veracruz, Catalan Hermanos, 1920.
- Siete cuentos mexicanos, Panama City, Biblioteca Selecta, 1946.
- Soberana juventud, Madrid, Editorial Plenitud, 1967.
- Urbe (Super-poema bolchevique en 5 cantos), cover and engravings by Jean Charlot, Mexico City, Andrés Botas e hijos, 1924.

=== Translations ===
==== English ====
- Metropolis [Urbe], translated by John Dos Passos, New York, The T. S. Book Company, 1929, [35]p.; now in Jed Rasula and Tim Conley (org.)
- Burning City: Poems of Metropolitan Modernity, Notre Dame, Action Books, 2012.
- City, Bolshevik Super-Poem in 5 Cantos [Urbe], bilingual edition, new translation, notes and afterword by Brandon Holmquest, New York, Ugly Duckling Presse, « Lost Literature Series », 2010, 30 p.

==== Other languages ====
- Poèmes interdits [Poemas interdictos], French translation by Edmond Vandercammen, Brussels, Cahiers du Journal des Poètes, 1936, 68 p.
- Stridentisme! Poésie et Manifeste (1921-1927), bilingual and illustrated edition, organization, French translation, notes and afterword by Antoine Chareyre, Paris, Le Temps des Cerises, "Commun'art", 2013 [Comprimido estridentista, Andamios interiores, Urbe, Poemas interdictos].

=== Critical references ===
- Flores, Tatiana. Mexico’s Revolutionary Avant-Gardes: From Estridentismo to ¡30-30!, New Haven: Yale University Press, 2013.
- Monahan, Kenneth Charles. Manuel Maples Arce and Estridentismo (Doctorate Thesis), Northwestern University, 1972.
- Rashkin, Elissa J. The Stridentist Movement in Mexico: The Avant-Garde and Cultural Change in the 1920s, New York: Lexington, 2009.
- Schneider, Luis Mario. El estridentismo o una literatura de la estrategia, Mexico City: Conaculta, 1997.
