= Cueto (surname) =

Cueto is a Spanish surname. Notable people with the surname include:

- Al Cueto, former basketball player
- Alonso Cueto, novelist and playwright
- Anderson Cueto, football player
- César Cueto, football player
- Emilio Cueto, guitarist
- Germán Cueto, Mexican painter, sculptor, puppet designer and puppeteer
- Johnny Cueto (born 1986), Dominican baseball pitcher
- Lola Cueto, Mexican painter, printmaker, puppet designer, and puppeteer
- Mark Cueto (born 1979), English rugby player
- Matanza Cueto (born 1982), ring name of American professional wrestler Jeffrey Cobb
- Mireya Cueto (1922–2013), Mexican puppeteer, writer and dramaturg

Fictional characters with the surname include:

- Dario and Antonio Cueto, putative owners and promoters of the professional wrestling promotion Lucha Underground (Dario 2014–2017, Antonio 2018–). In storyline, Antonio is the father of Dario and Matanza Cueto.
