= Cueto =

Cueto may refer to:

- Cueto (surname)
- Cueto, Cuba, a municipality in Holguin, Cuba
- Cueto, Spain, Cantabria, Spain
