= Stridentism =

Mexican avant-garde movement

Stridentism (Spanish: estridentismo) was an artistic and multidisciplinary avant-garde movement, founded in the city of Puebla by Manuel Maples Arce at the end of 1921 but formally developed in Xalapa where all the founders moved after the University of Veracruz granted its support for the movement. Stridentism shares some characteristics with Cubism, Dadaism, Futurism and Ultraism, but it developed a specific social dimension, taken from the Mexican Revolution, and a concern for action and its own present. Stridentists were part of the political avant-garde, in contrast to the "elitist" modernism of Los Contemporáneos.

== Chronology ==
1921: Mexico City, December 31, Manuel Maples Arce gives the first manifesto out.

1923: Maples Arce and List Arzubide give out the second manifesto, in the city of Puebla.

1923: Irradiador: short-lived journal (September, October, and November of 1923)

1924: First Stridentist Expo, at the Café de Nadie in Mexico City.

1925: The group moves from Mexico City to Xalapa (recreated in their works as "Estridentópolis"). Third manifesto in the city of Zacatecas.

1926: Fourth and last manifesto in Ciudad Victoria.

1927: The group separated, for political reasons.

1929-1930: A group of stridentists met in Paris and participated in the group Cercle et Carré.

1930: Leopoldo Méndez and Germán List Arzubide traveled to the United States.

1932: Germán Cueto and Arqueles Vela returned to Mexico City from Paris

== Artists ==
Poets: Manuel Maples Arce, Germán List Arzubide, Salvador Gallardo.

Writers/Journalists: Arqueles Vela, Carlos Noriega Hope.

Visual artists: Ramón Alva de la Canal, Leopoldo Méndez, Fermín Revueltas, Lola Cueto.

Multidisciplinary artists: Germán Cueto, Luis Quintanilla, Jean Charlot, Gaston Dinner.

Musicians: Silvestre Revueltas, Ángel Salas.

Photographers: Edward Weston, Tina Modotti.

== Bibliography ==
- Schneider, Luis Mario. El estridentismo o una literatura de la estrategia, Mexico City: Conaculta, 1997. ISBN 970-18-0376-0
- Escalante, Evodio. Elevación y caída del estridentismo, México: Conaculta, 2002. ISBN 970-18-8138-9
- Hadatty Mora, Yanna. La ciudad paroxista. Prosa mexicana de vanguardia (1921–1932), Mexico City: UNAM, 2009. ISBN 978-607-20-0360-6
- Rashkin, Elissa J. The Stridentist Movement in Mexico: The Avant-garde and Cultural Change in the 1920s, Lanham, Maryland, USA: Lexington Books/Rowman and Littlefield Publishers, 2009. ISBN 978-0-7391-3156-5
- Flores, Tatiana. Mexico’s Revolutionary Avant-Gardes: From Estridentismo to ¡30-30!, New Haven: Yale University Press, 2013. ISBN 978-0-300-18448-8
- Klych, Linda. The Noisemakers: Estridentismo, Vanguardism, and Social Action in Postrevolutionary Mexico, Berkeley: University of California Press, 2018. ISBN 978-0-520-29640-4
