= Juan Benito Díaz de Gamarra y Dávalos =

Juan Benito Díaz de Gamarra y Dávalos (1745–1783) was a Mexican philosopher during the period of enlightenment in New Spain, modern-day Mexico. His thought was primarily concerned with approaching Christianity, particularly Spanish Catholicism, with the philosophical methodology of the time.

== Life ==
Díaz de Gamarra was born in Zamora, Michoacán. He entered the Jesuit college of San Ildefonso in Mexico City in 1756 and studied rhetoric, art, and canons. Afterward, at the age of 19, he entered the congregation of San Felipe Neri in 1764. He acted as an attorney at the congregation and traveled to Spain, Portugal and Rome between 1767 and 1770. He managed to fulfill his role as an attorney with the Iglesia del Oratorio de San Miguel el Grande a la de San Juan de Letrán. He also obtained his doctorate in canons at the University of Pisa and was granted membership at the Bolonia Academy of Sciences. At his return to Mexico in 1770 he acted as director and professor of philosophy at El Colegio de San Francisco de Sales, in San Miguel el Grande. He changed the curriculum to focus more on the best of Europe's philosophers. He was dismissed from his intellectual positions of director, professor, and prefect of studies due to his possession of prohibited books. He died on November 1, 1783.

== Selected works ==
- Elements of modern philosophy (1774)
- Academias filosóficas (1774), Errors in human understanding (1781)
- Memorial ajustado (1790).
