= Fernando Leal (artist) =

Afro-Mexican painter

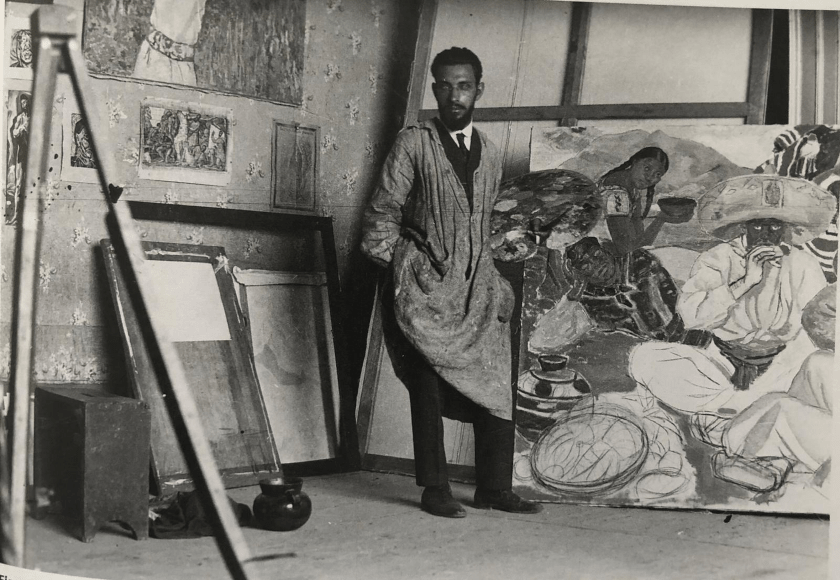
- Fernando Leal in his studio painting “Camp of a Zapatista Colonel”
- Born: February 26, 1896; Mexico City
- Died: October 7, 1964 (aged 68); Mexico City
- Education: Academy of San Carlos
- Occupation: Painter
- Known for: Painting, lithography, engraving
- Movement: Mexican muralism
- Relatives: Fernando Leal Audirac (son)

Fernando Leal (February 26, 1896 – October 7, 1964) was one of the first painters to participate in the Mexican muralism movement starting in the 1920s. After seeing one of his paintings, Secretary of Education José Vasconcelos invited Leal to paint at the Escuela Nacional Preparatoria. The resulting work is Los danzantes de Chalma. Leal also painted a mural dedicated to Simón Bolívar at the Anfiteatro Bolivar, as well as religious murals such as those at the chapel dedicated to the Virgin of Guadalupe at the Basilica Villa in Tepeyac.

== Life ==
Fernando Leal was born in Mexico City on February 26, 1896. He first studied art at the Academy of San Carlos, then switched to the Escuela al Aire Libre de Coyoacán, studying under Alfredo Ramos Martinez. He was classmates with Gabriel Fernández Ledesma, Rafael Vera de Córdoba, Ramón Alva de la Canal and Fermín Revueltas.

Leal died on October 7, 1964. He is survived by his son, Fernando Leal Audirac, who also became a noted Mexican painter.

== Career ==
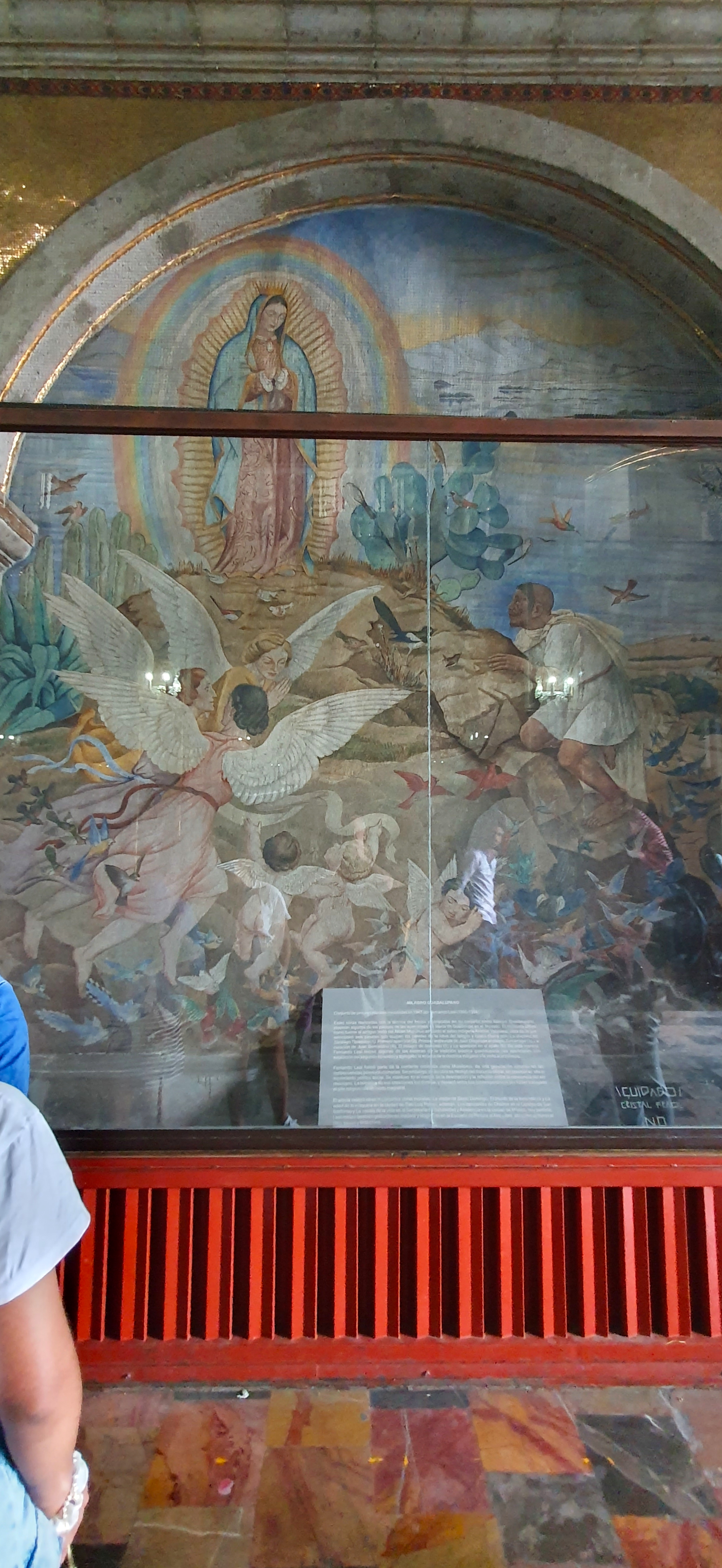
Depiction of the appearance of the Virgin of Guadalupe at the Tepeyac chapel

Leal was one of the first muralists in Mexico, in a movement that began in the 1920s. In 1921 Vasconcelos, Secretary of Education, visited Leal’s school in Coyoacán. An easel painting by the artist called Zapatistas at Rest, painted that same year, caught his eye. Leal said that the imagery of the indigenous persons with realistic detail, done in European painting techniques, fit Vasconcelos’ needs. He asked Leal to do a mural on the walls of the preparatory school. Leal was recruited by Vasconcelos along with a number of other artists such as Diego Rivera, Xavier Guerrero, Amado de la Cueva, Jean Charlot, David Alfaro Siqueiros and others to paint for the post-Revolutionary government, to create a “new sense of Mexican identity.”

The first mural he painted was Los danzantes de Chalma at the Escuela Nacional Preparatoria, today the San Ildefonso College. Leal chose the theme when offered his choice by Vasconcelos. The encaustic mural shows a ritual performed in the sanctuary town of Chalma, with its fusion of Catholic and indigenous rites. It is naturalist in style with simplification of forms in a Post-Impressionist manner. Opposite this mural is La conquista de Tenochtitlán (Conquest of Tenochtitlan) by Jean Charlot, who was invited to paint by Leal.

The other of his best-known works is a fresco at the Anfiteatro Bolívar, painted from 1930 to 1933. It is notable for its depiction of the life of Simon Bolivar. In the Bolivar mural, Leal combined history with fantasy in the main scene with Bolivar on horseback. The bottom shows the violence of the struggle for liberty, and features indigenous people who appear as Muses or inspiration for the hero.

He also painted works which have not survived. In 1927, he painted murals at the Departamento de Salubridad, but these were destroyed. Also destroyed was a mural for the Instituto Nacional de Panamá, with the title of Neptuno encandenado (Neptune chained), a criticism of imperialism. In 1943, he painted two panels in the train station of San Luis Potosí called El triunfo de la locomotora (The triumph of the locomotive) and La edad de la máquina (The age of the machine). The first of these contrasts the old and new ways to travel. The old way, by foot and horse/donkey, shows robbery and other violent scenes, while the train is shown as traversing great distances. In San Luis Potosí he painted the vault of the San Juan de Díos Church, entitled La protección de la Virgen a Santo Domingo (The protection of the Virgin of Santo Domingo). In 1949, he painted seven murals at the Tepeyac chapel at the Villa de Guadalupe, frescos that narrate the story of the appearance of the Virgin of Guadalupe.

He taught painting at the Academy of San Carlos, and in 1927 was appointed director of the Centro Popular de Pintura in Nonoalco. Its mission was to make art accessible to the working classes. In 1952 he was appointed Ministry of Culture, where he campaigned for artists´ rights in 1959. He also served director of the Escuela al Aire Libre de Coyoacán.

Leal was founder of the group ¡30-30!, which published a review in opposition to academic ideology in art, taking part in the group’s exhibitions starting in 1929.

He occasionally wrote art criticism. In 1952, he published El derecho de la cultura (The right of culture). He also wrote an unfinished history of the Academy of San Carlos.

His paintings can be found in the Museo de Arte Moderno, including El hombre de la tuna (The man of the prickly pear) and Campesinos con sarape (Farm workers with sarape). (encmex) He was also a successful wood engraver.

== Artistry ==
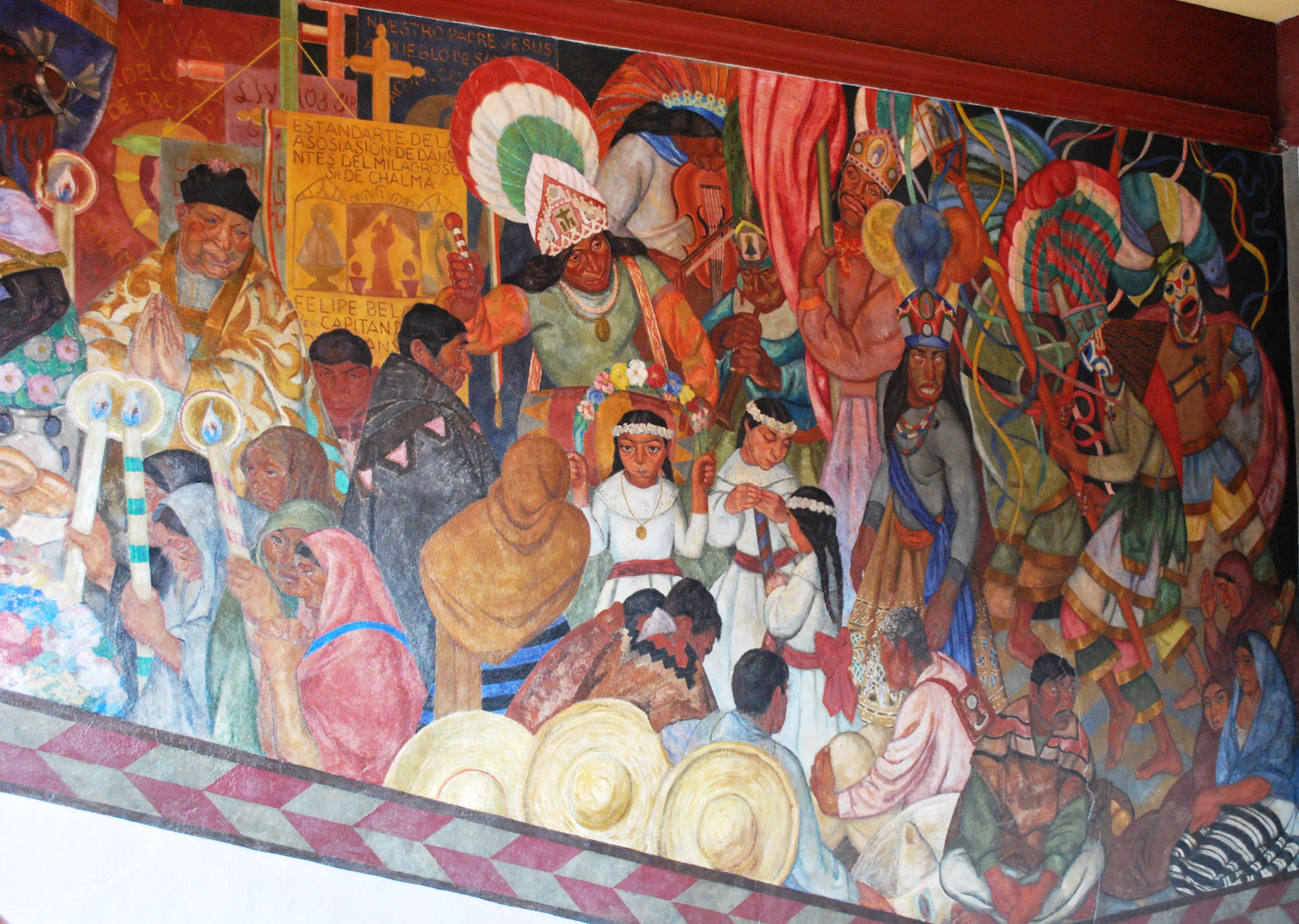
Los danzantes de Chalma at the San Ildefonso College

Leal is best known for his mural work, but he also did engraving, lithography and painting on canvas. He was one of the first Mexican muralists using a number of different techniques. He was one of the first to create small trial versions of a work in order to find the best means of executing monumental works. His murals usually used encaustic painting producing rich transparent colors, subtly graduated and free from heavy chiaroscuro .

He was notable for his use of color and his early use of images from Mexican rural and popular culture. His themes were mostly popular traditions and Biblical personages, one of the first to use indigenous themes for monumental work. His work features a synthesis of shapes in the styles of Saturnino Herrán, avoiding allegory, trademarks of the Mexican realist school of paintings. His artistic style was somewhere between Baroque and Classic but with use of bright colors. The base of the work was Classic but the repetition of forms is Baroque. However, his canvas works tends to be stylized with a simplification of forms in a post Impressionist style.

== See also ==
- Mexican Muralism
- Fresco
- Encaustic Painting
