= Carlos Alvarado Lang =

Mexican printmaker

- Born: January 14, 1905; La Piedad de Cabadas, Michoacán, Mexico
- Died: September 3, 1961 (aged 56); Mexico City, Mexico
- Other names: Carlos Alvarado-Lang
- Education: Academy of San Carlos
- Known for: printmaking

Carlos Alvarado Lang (January 14, 1905 – September 3, 1961) was a Mexican printmaker and professor. He taught metal engraving and later served as the program director at Academy of San Carlos, from 1929 to 1949.

== Biography ==
Carlos Alvarado Lang was born January 14, 1905, in La Piedad de Cabadas, Michoacán, Mexico. When he was age 14, he began his studies in the National School of Fine Arts (Escuela Nacional de Artes Plásticas de la Universidad Nacional autónoma de México).

Alvarado Lang studied printmaking under engraver Emiliano Valadéz at the Academy of San Carlos (Spanish: Academia de San Carlos, also Escuela Nacional de San Carlos) in Mexico City. In 1929, he followed Emiliano Valadéz on his chair. After the coursework offer at the Academy of San Carlos was expanded in 1930, he got the chair of metal engraving. From 1942 to 1949 he was director of the Academy of San Carlos. He had many notable students, including Lola Cueto.

Posthumously his works were exhibited at the Escuela Nacional de Pintura, Escultura y Grabado "La Esmeralda" (1963); in the Museo de Arte Moderno (1971); the museum of the Palacio de Bellas Artes (1981); and in further notable institutions.

== Collections ==
Alvarado Lang's work is in many public museum collections, including:

- Blanton Museum of Art, Austin, Texas, U.S.
- Brooklyn Museum, Brooklyn, New York City, New York, U.S.
- McNay Art Museum, San Antonio, Texas, U.S.
- Metropolitan Museum of Art, New York City, New York, U.S.
- Museo Nacional de Arte, Mexico City, Mexico
