= Germán Cueto =

Mexican painter, sculptor, and decorative artist (1893–1975)

- Born: Germán Gutiérrez Cueto y Vidal; February 8 or 9, 1883; Mexico City
- Died: February 14, 1975 (aged 92)
- Known for: painting, sculpture, puppet design
- Spouse(s): Lola Cueto (m. 1919–?; divorce), María Galán, Ester Echeverría (?–1975; death)
- Children: 3, including Mireya Cueto

Germán Cueto (February 8 or 9, 1883 – February 14, 1975) was a Mexican artist. He was part of the initial wave of artistic activity following the Mexican Revolution. However, his stay in Europe from 1927 to 1932 moved him into more European and more abstract work, especially sculpture. While he had a number of exhibitions in Mexico during his life including a retrospective at the Museo de Arte Moderno in 1965, he did not have the kind of success that many of his contemporaries did as he did not follow the then dominant themes or styles of Mexican muralism movement. His work was considered to be avant-garde and is considered to be the first Mexican abstract artist, creating masks and sculptures of wood, wire, plastic, sheet metal, ceramic, electrical wire and other materials, traditional and non-traditional.

== Life ==
Germán Cueto was born Germán Gutiérrez Cueto y Vidal on February 8, 1893, in Mexico City, to parents Javier Gutiérrez Cueto and Paz Vidal. His father was from an intellectual and socially influential family from Cantabria, Spain, related to politician Matilde de la Torre and María Blanchard .

He was studying chemistry when the Mexican Revolution broke out, interrupting his studies as he fled to Spain to escape the fighting. At this time he met sculptor Fidencio Nava, which convinced him to change careers to art. When he returned to Mexico in 1918, he entered the Academy of San Carlos. However, he did not like its formalism and left shortly thereafter. He later studied in Paris.

In 1923, he was a cofounder of the Stridentism movement in Mexico, along with Manuel Maples Arce, Germán List Arzubide, Salvador Gallardo, Silvestre Revueltas, Jean Charlot, Edward Weston and Tina Modotti. The goal of this movement was to reshape literature and art entirely, but fading by the end of the decade.

From 1927 to 1932, he lived in Paris, traveling to the Netherlands, Belgium, Spain, Italy and Switzerland. Here he created a circle of contacts and friends in the European vanguard often through María Blanchard. These included Julio González, Otto van Rees (artist), Angelina Beloff, Adam Fischer, Joaquín Torres García, Jacques Lipchitz and Constantin Brâncuși. He became a member of the Cercle et Carré where he became associated with Piet Mondrian, Jean Arp, Wassily Kandinsky and Georges Vantongerloo. After the death of María Blanchard in 1932, he decided to return to Mexico with his family, inviting Angelina Beloff, Diego Rivera's abandoned first wife, to accompany them.

In Mexico, he identified politically and socially with the dominant Mexican school of painting, but his aesthetics were more European due to his stay in Paris. He did not like the exclusiveness of the art scene in Mexico and for this reason tended to stay apart from his Mexican contemporaries.

Cueto's first wife was Lola Cueto whom he married in 1919. Together they lived in Paris for many years. The union produced two daughters, named Ana Maria and Mireya. Mireya Cueto (born 1922) became a well-known puppeteer, writer and playwright, winning the Bellas Artes Medal for her life's work. Mireya began her career helping her parents. Cueto later had a son, named Javier Cueto. His second wife was María Galán, and his widow was Ester Echeverría.

Germán Cueto died on February 14, 1975, at age 83 from heart failure.

== Career ==
Cueto worked in a number of disciplines but is best known for mask making, especially related to theatre and abstract sculpture.

He began his career in 1922 as an assistant to sculptor Ignacio Asúnsolo, who work working on renovations to the Secretaría de Educación Pública building . Cueto was a member of the Stridentism movement in the 1920s, when he began to make masks with cardboard and other materials. In 1924 he had an exhibition of these masks at the “El Café de Nadie” affiliated with the Stridentism movement, most based on friends including one dedicated to Leopoldo Méndez . He continued to make masks for theatrical productions and exhibition, with the number of masks made over his lifetime estimated at over one thousand.

Although Cueto was part of the initial wave of artistic activity spurred by the Secretaría de Educación Pública under José Vasconcelos, the movement limited much of artistic production, especially sculpture to themes related to praising the nation, liberty and work. Cueto's time in Europe in the late 1920s and early 1930s pushed him into a different direction. While considered to be in Mexico's vanguard, he was frequently frustrated by his inability to sell works after his return to Mexico. He was frequently excluded from public projects as his works did not relate to Mexican heroes or Mexican folkloric themes. Most of his work would not be appreciated until late in his career and after his death, as a pioneer of abstract and modern art in Mexico and Latin America. Although still relatively unknown in Mexico, his work is more valued by collectors, especially small bronze pieces.

While never having the success that many of his contemporaries did, Cueto did have a number of exhibitions during his lifetime. His first was of masks in 1924 at the “El Café de Nadie” in Mexico City. Living in Paris, he exhibited with the Cercle et le Carré (Circle and Square) group, of which he was a member, as well as at the Renaissance Gallery in Paris (1928), the Quatre Gallery in Paris (1929), the 23 Gallery in Paris (1930), the Galeries Dalmau in Spain (1930) and at a collective exhibition in Switzerland. After returning to Mexico, he had some exhibitions such as the Galería de Arte Mexicano in Mexico City (1932), the UNAM Gallery (1933), a major individual exhibition at the Galería de Arte Mexicano in 1944, Mont-Oredain Gallery in Mexico City (1948), Glardecor Gallery in Mexico City (1951), the Salón de la Plástica Mexicana (1954), Excélsior Gallery and Proteo Gallery in Mexico City (1955) and the Instituto Francés de América Latina in 1960. He had one major individual exhibition outside of Mexico at the Suenks-Franska Konstgalleriet in Sweden in 1954.

Despite his reputation for being avant-garde, his work was not recognized or shown at the prestigious Museo de Arte Moderno in Mexico City until 1965, when the institution dedicated a “very deserved” retrospective of his work. It has a larger exhibition of this type in 1981 after the artist's death.

Other exhibitions of his work after his death include the Futurismo & futurism exhibition at the Palazzo Grassi in Venice (1986), Centro Cultural Santo Domingo in Oaxaca (2000), the Federico Silva Museum in San Luis Potosí (2005), Museo Nacional Centro de Arte Reina Sofía (2005), the Carrillo Gil Museum in Mexico City (2006) and the Museo de Arte in Querétaro (2007).

His canvas works can be found primarily in museum in Mexico and Europe with a notable collection held by the Blaisten Collection in Mexico City.

His sculptures, including monumental works can be found in institutions in Mexico and Europe such as the Sala Manuel M. Ponce at the Palacio de Bellas Artes and the Museo de Arte Moderno. On permanent display at the Museo de Arte Moderno is the sculpture Tehuana, which consists of sheet metal about 110 cm high. He did ceramics work for the Arabia Workshop in Helsinki and a porcelain piece for the Royal Copenhagen in Denmark . One major monumental work is an iron piece painted in enamel, for the Gustavsberg porcelain plant in Sweden sponsored by the Swedish-Mexican Society in 1954. In Mexico, he created the monumental piece called El Corredor (The Runner) for the 1968 Mexico City Olympics, places in front of the stadium at the Ciudad Universitaria .

Another notable area for Cueto was theatre and education. After he returned to Mexico from Europe, Carlos Chávez employed him to develop characters for an educational puppet theatre. From 1924 to 1926 he taught art at the Artes y Oficio Gabriela Mistral and at the Normal para Maestros. He also went to teach in Hidalgo as part of a cultural mission organized by Rafael Ramírez Heredia . In 1948 he directed the Dance Institute at the Palacio de Bellas Artes for a time, creating masks for various performances. From 1956 to 1959 he was an art professor at the Escuela Nacional de Pintura, Escultura y Grabado "La Esmeralda". In 1960 he became a teacher at the Escuela de Artesanias of the Ciudadela, teaching work with enamel.

Recognitions include honorable mention at the Bienal Nacional de Escultura in 1963 and 1964. He was a founding member of the Academia de Artes and a member of the Salón de la Plástica Mexicana .

== Artistry ==
Cueto created oils, watercolors, glass, ceramics, enamels, collages, murals, ink drawings, sculpture and even some literature. He was best known for masks and sculptures using various materials such as wire, clay, stone, iron, wood and more.

Cueto's early artistic influence from Stridentism, an artistic and intellectual movement in Mexico in the 1920s of which he was a member. Like many other Strident artists, Cueto rejected traditional values and religious conventions. This usually translated into pieces related to a vision of a future utopia. Later influences included Cubism, Constructivism, Art Deco and later a more primitive look. However, most of this is linked to his time (1927-1932) in Europe, where he was influenced directly by Picasso, Brâncuși, Gargollo and Juan Gris . His artistic vision remained tied to Europe and the abstract art movement taking shape there, which was still very novel for Mexico. This made him the most vanguard sculptor of the first half of the 20th century in Mexico as well as the country's first abstract artist. It also meant that his work as more influential in Europe than in Mexico.

One major aspect of his sculptural work is the use of new and unusual materials along with more traditional ones. He created sculptures of bronze, wood, wire, sheet metal, ceramics, enamel on metal, concrete, electrical cable, plastic and more. His aesthetic followed much of Umberto Boccioni's 1912 Manifesto of Futurist Sculpture when said that sculpture should use and combine whatever materials needed to realize a piece. It also emphasized the abstract over the figurative. Much of his experimentation was based on his knowledge of chemistry from his early student days and made him one of the most experimental sculptors in 20th century Mexico. Examples include concrete, electrical cable and wire pieces such as Estela II, Máscara (1948) and El Nahual. The sculpture Napoleón is done in limestone; Diálogo is done in multicolored wood.

Another important endeavor for Cueto was the creation of masks, the concept of which also figures in his sculpture and other work. He made masks of papier-mâché, cartonería, ceramic, plaster, wood, metal and wire. Many of these masks were made for use in theatre, with him often returning to creating fantastical faces with innovative designs.
