= Colegio de San Ildefonso =

Art museum in Mexico City, Mexico

Coordinates: 19°26′9.78″N 99°7′50.37″W

San Ildefonso College Museum and Cultural Center
- Colegio de San Ildefonso
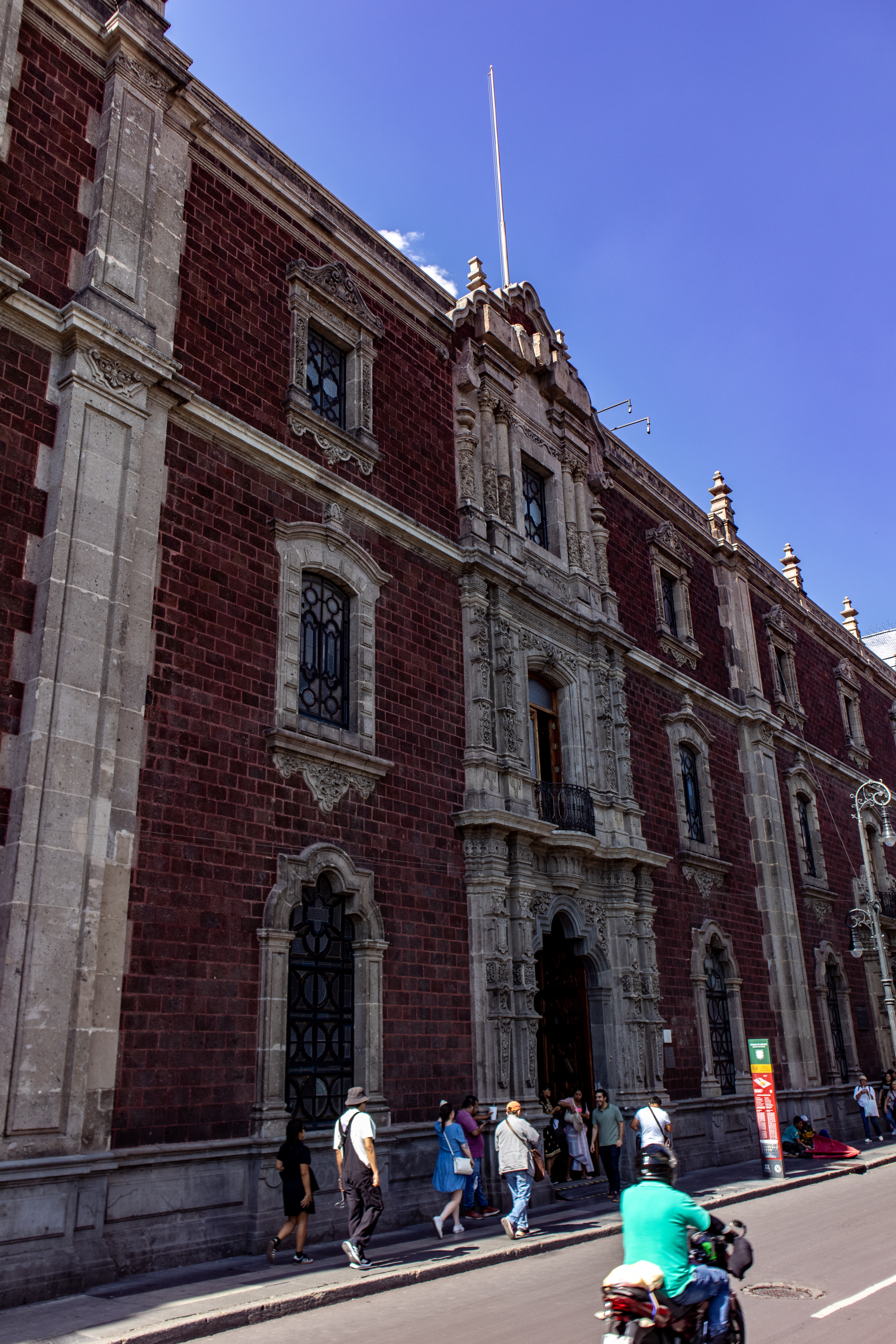
- A colonial palace section façade: Colegio Grande
- Former name: San Ildefonso College; Jesuit boarding school
- Established: 1588 Jesuit boarding school
- Dissolved: 1978 (became museum)
- Location: San Ildefonso Street, Mexico City
- Key holdings: José Clemente Orozco; Diego Rivera
- Website: www.sanildefonso.org.mx
- Birthplace of Mexican Muralism

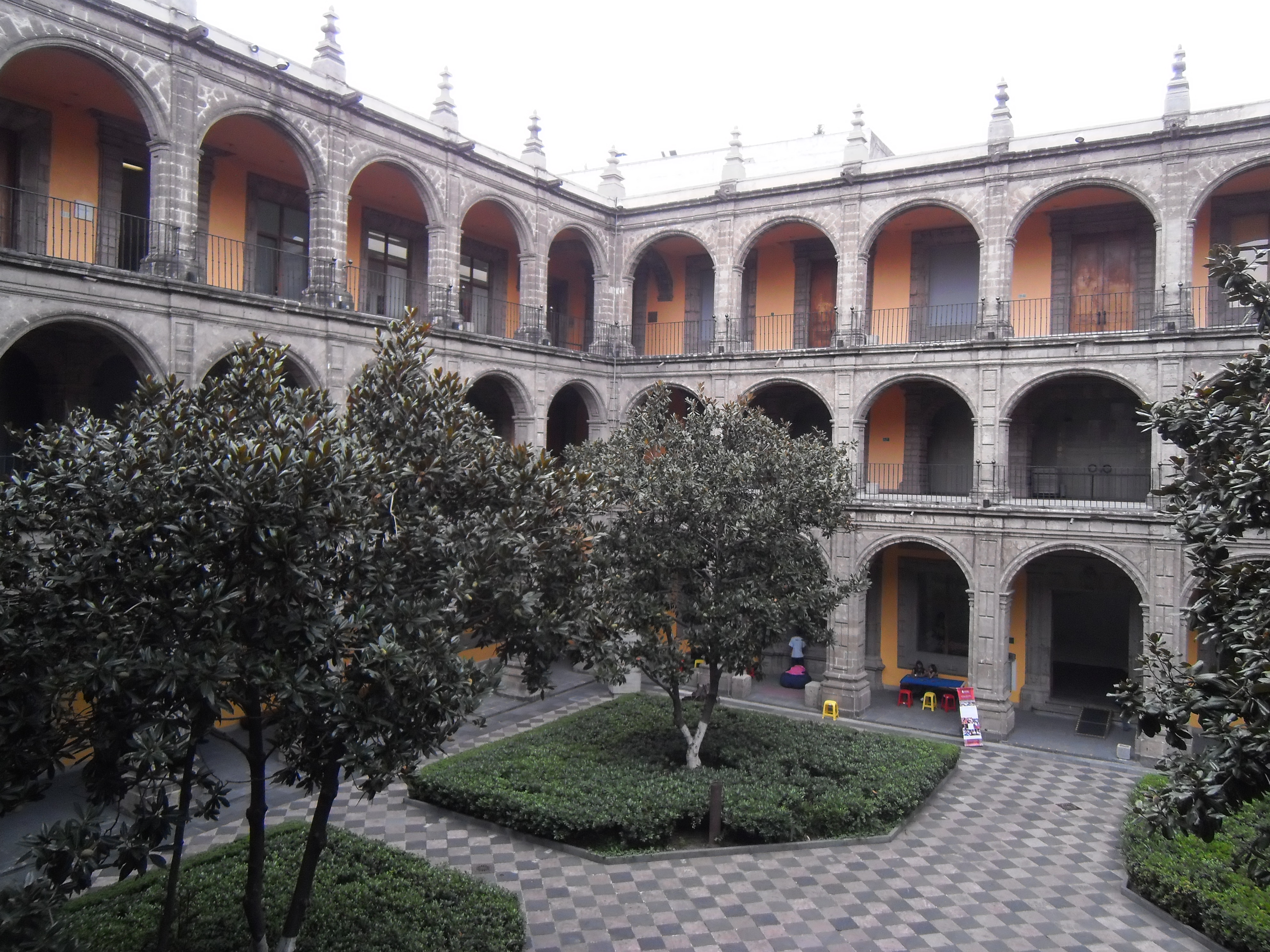
Courtyard of los Pasantes, colonial construction

Colegio de San Ildefonso, currently is a museum and cultural center in Mexico City, considered to be the birthplace of the Mexican Muralism movement. San Ildefonso began as a prestigious Jesuit boarding school, and after the Reform War it gained educational prestige again as National Preparatory School. This school and the building closed completely in 1978, then reopened as a museum and cultural center in 1992. The museum has permanent and temporary art and archeological exhibitions in addition to the many murals painted on its walls by José Clemente Orozco, Fernando Leal, Diego Rivera, and others. The complex is located between San Ildefonso Street and Justo Sierra Street in the historic center of Mexico City.

The college was founded 1588 and it is composed of six sections, that are five colonial baroque: the Colegio Grande, Colegio Chico, the chapel, El Generalito and the courtyard of los Pasantes, all completed in 1749; and one modern neo-baroque: the Amphitheater Bolívar completed in 1911.

== History ==
=== Jesuit college ===
The Jesuits arrived in Mexico in 1572. With evangelization of the native population mostly complete in central Mexico, this order soon turned to establishing schools, especially schools for Criollo youth. They founded numerous colleges both in Mexico City and the outlying provinces, but the most important of these was San Ildefonso, founded in 1588. In 1618, it merged with the old San Pedro y San Pablo College, which was nearly in ruins, and gained a royal seal from Philip III of Spain.

Although administered by Jesuits, the education here was not solely dedicated to religious matters. San Ildefonso was not a college in the modern sense of the word, but rather more like a boarding residence and school. Young men lived and studied at the school, which did offer classes, but San Ildefonso's students were also enrolled in the Royal and Pontifical University of Mexico, taking classes there and with the old faculty of San Pedro y San Pablo.

In the early 18th century, student population at the school had grown such that building expansion was needed. Work was begun on extending the building in 1712 and completed in 1749. This section of the complex is now known as the "Colegio Chico" (Small College) as opposed to the original section, called the "Colegio Grande" (Large College). The facade of both sections, which faces San Ildefonso Street, was constructed around this time as well.

The school reached its height in the 18th century, becoming one of the most important educational institutions in Mexico City, along with the university. However, the Jesuits were expelled from all Spanish lands in 1767, including Mexico, by Charles III. Operation of the school was then given to non-monastic clergy, and the school declined. The building continued to function as the San Ildefonso College between 1767 and 1867, but it was also used for other purposes, such as housing soldiers from the Flandes Regiment, being a temporary site of the Jurisprudence School, and housing several departments of the School of Medicine. During the Mexican American War and the French intervention, United States and French troops used this building as barracks.

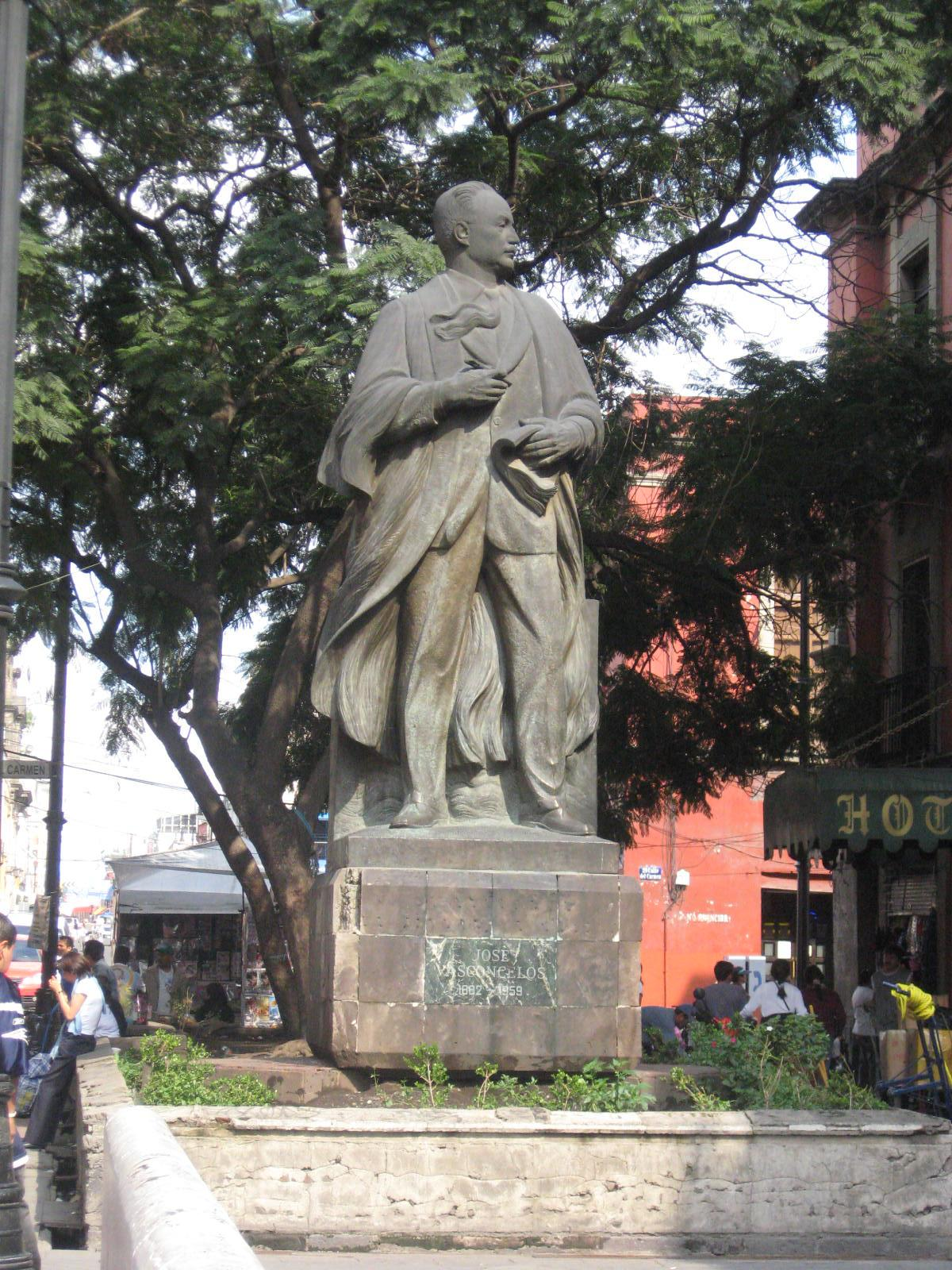
José Vasconcelos at San Ildefonso

=== National Preparatory School ===
The old Jesuit school had almost completely fallen into ruin by the time of the Reform Laws in the 1860s. These Laws secularized most of Church property, including the San Ildefonso College building. In 1867, Benito Juárez began reform of the educational system, taking it out of clerical hands and making it a government function. San Ildefonso was converted into the Escuela Nacional Preparatoria, or National Preparatory School, initially directed by Gabino Barreda, who organized the new school on the Positivist model of Auguste Comte (Comtism). The initial purpose of the school was to provide the nucleus of students for the soon-to-be-reconstructed Universidad Nacional (National University), later National Autonomous University of Mexico, which was re-established in 1910 by Justo Sierra.

The new preparatory school began functioning at the San Ildefonso building with more than 700-day students and 200 live-in students. The complex remained a separate entity until 1929, when the Universidad Nacional gained autonomy, meaning it became independent of the government, though still government-sponsored. The Preparatory School became part of the newly independent university system, being designated as Preparatory No. 1 for a short time. As part of the student revolts of 1968, some students hid inside the building, which resulted in an occupation by the Mexican Army, who entered the building by shooting a bazooka round on its 18th-century-old front door. Its name soon changed back to Escuela Nacional Preparatoria and remained so until 1978, when it closed completely.

=== Muralist movement ===
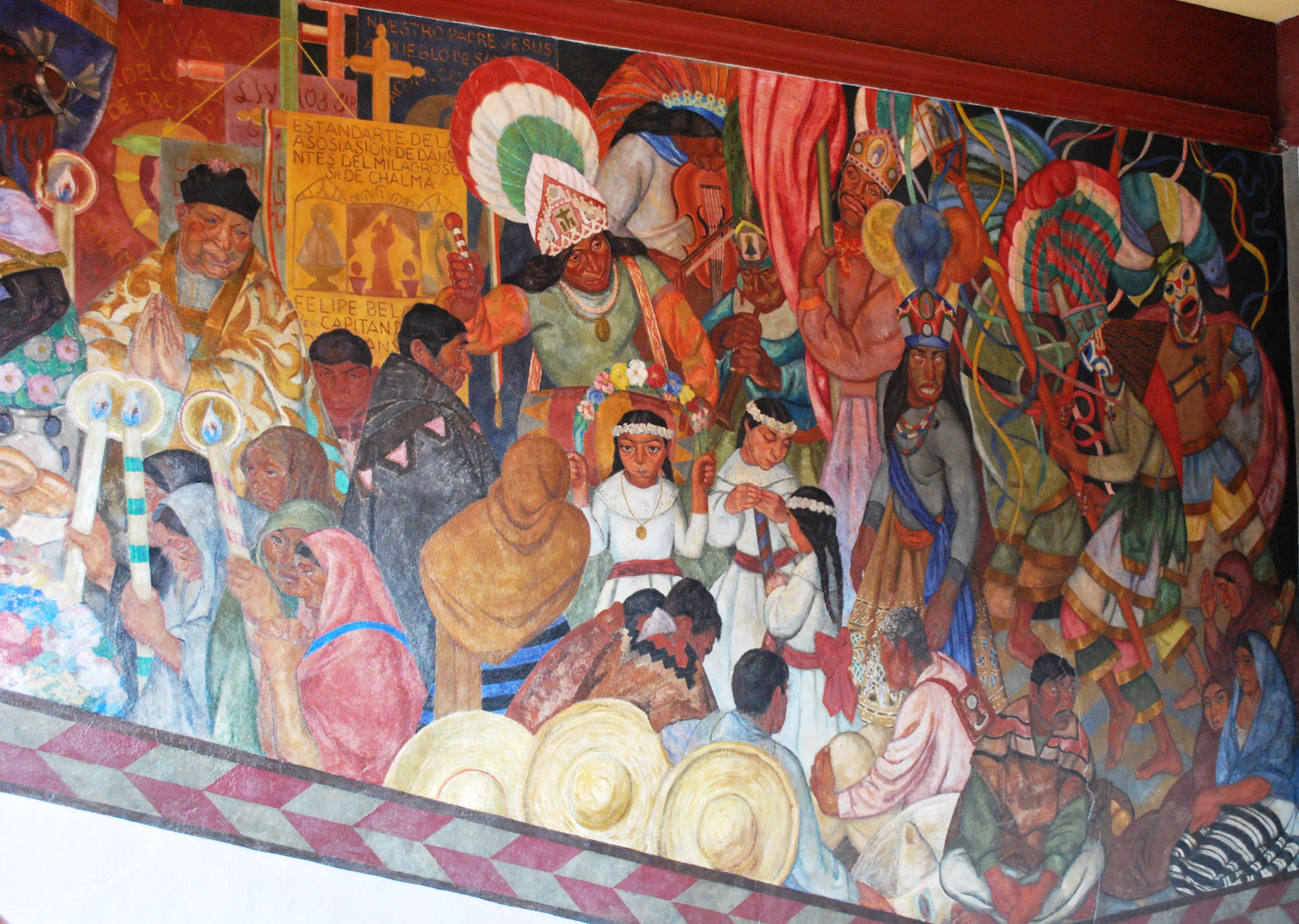
Fernando Leal: La fiesta del Señor de Chalma

In the 1920s, soon after the Mexican Revolution, the government sponsored mural paintings with themes centering on Mexico's history and politics of the post-Revolution era. San Ildefonso was one of the first public buildings to be painted this way. The artwork was commissioned by Secretary of Education José Vasconcelos, a former director of the Preparatory School. Painters who contributed mural work include Ramón Alva de la Canal, Fermin Revueltas, Fernando Leal, José Clemente Orozco, Diego Rivera, David Alfaro Siqueiros, and Jean Charlot.

=== Cultural center ===
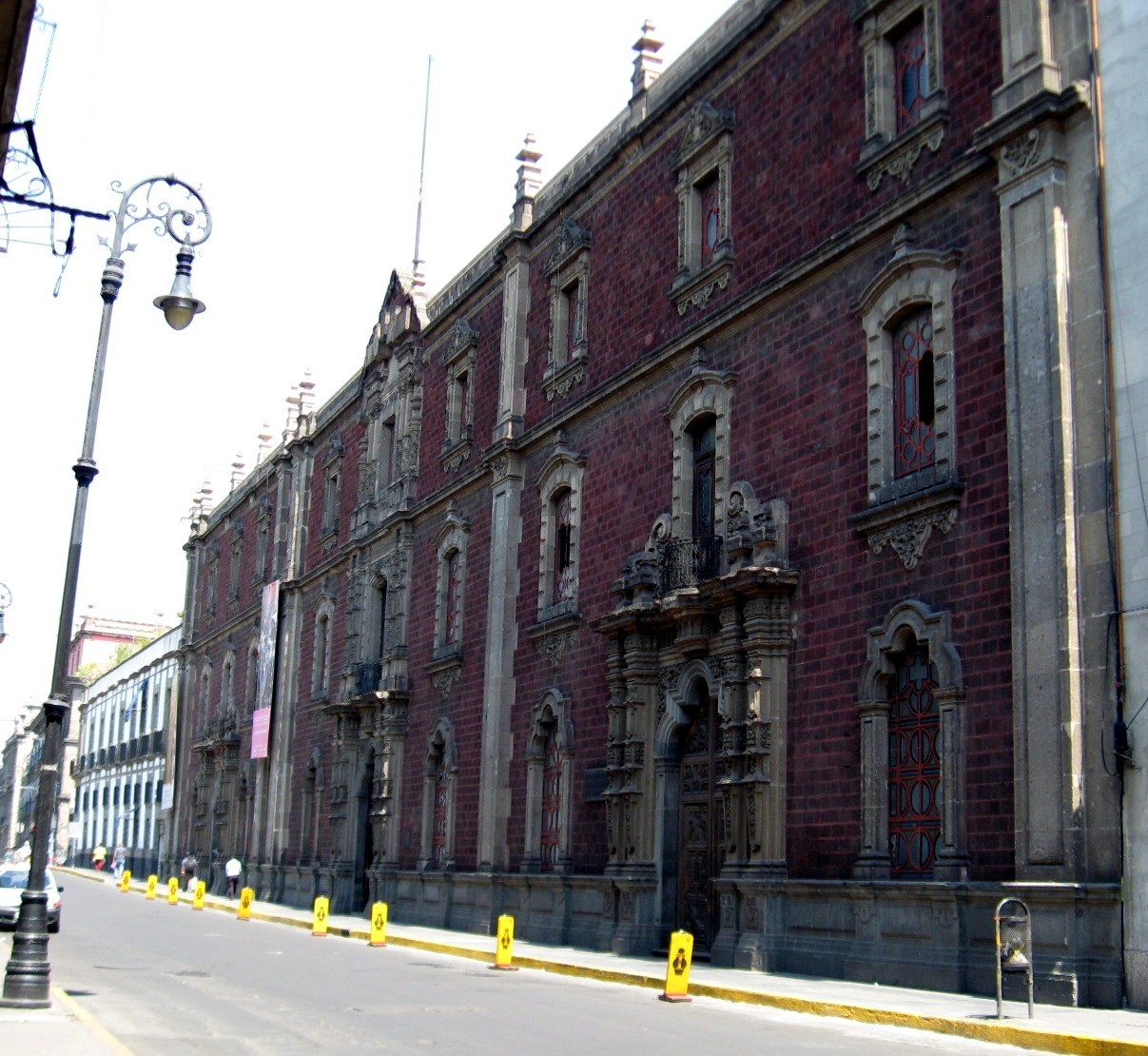
The Bolívar Amphitheater entrance (neo-baroque), now main entrance to museum

Today the building is a museum and cultural center. In 1978, the National Preparatory School was closed and the building remained closed to the public until 1992. In that year it was renovated for an exposition called "Esplendores de 30 siglos" (Splendors of 30 centuries). In 1994, the building was opened permanently as a cultural center and museum administered jointly by the National Autonomous University of Mexico, National Council for Culture and Arts, and the government of the Federal District of Mexico City. The museum hosts temporary art and archeological exhibits focusing on both Mexican and foreign cultures. One recent exhibition was called "Cicatrices de la Fe. El arte de las misiones del norte de la Nueva España 1600–1821" (Scars of the Faith. The art of the missions in the north of New Spain 1600–1821), focusing on the religious art used during the Colonial period to evangelize the Catholic faith in what is now northern Mexico. The exhibition brought together pieces from Mexico, the U.S., and Europe.

The museum is also an active participant in the effort to revitalize the historic center of Mexico City, offering space for cultural and business events, using the money earned to support its public cultural functions. There is also a gift shop in the patio of the Colegio Grande that offers museum publications, handcrafted jewelry, ceramics and textiles, as well as publications relating to the temporary and permanent collections of the museum.

== Description ==
=== San Ildefonso Street facade ===
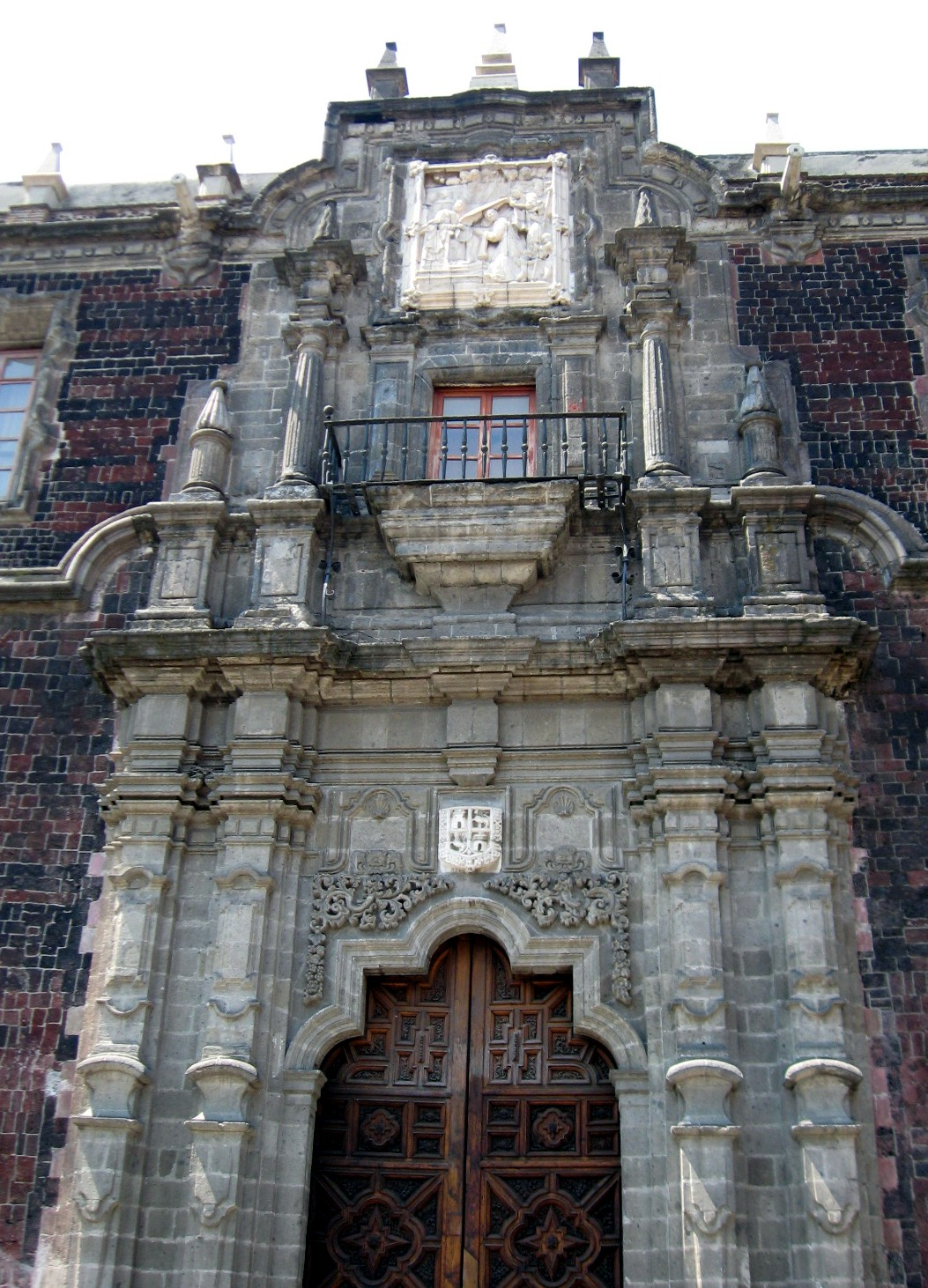
Colegio Grande portal

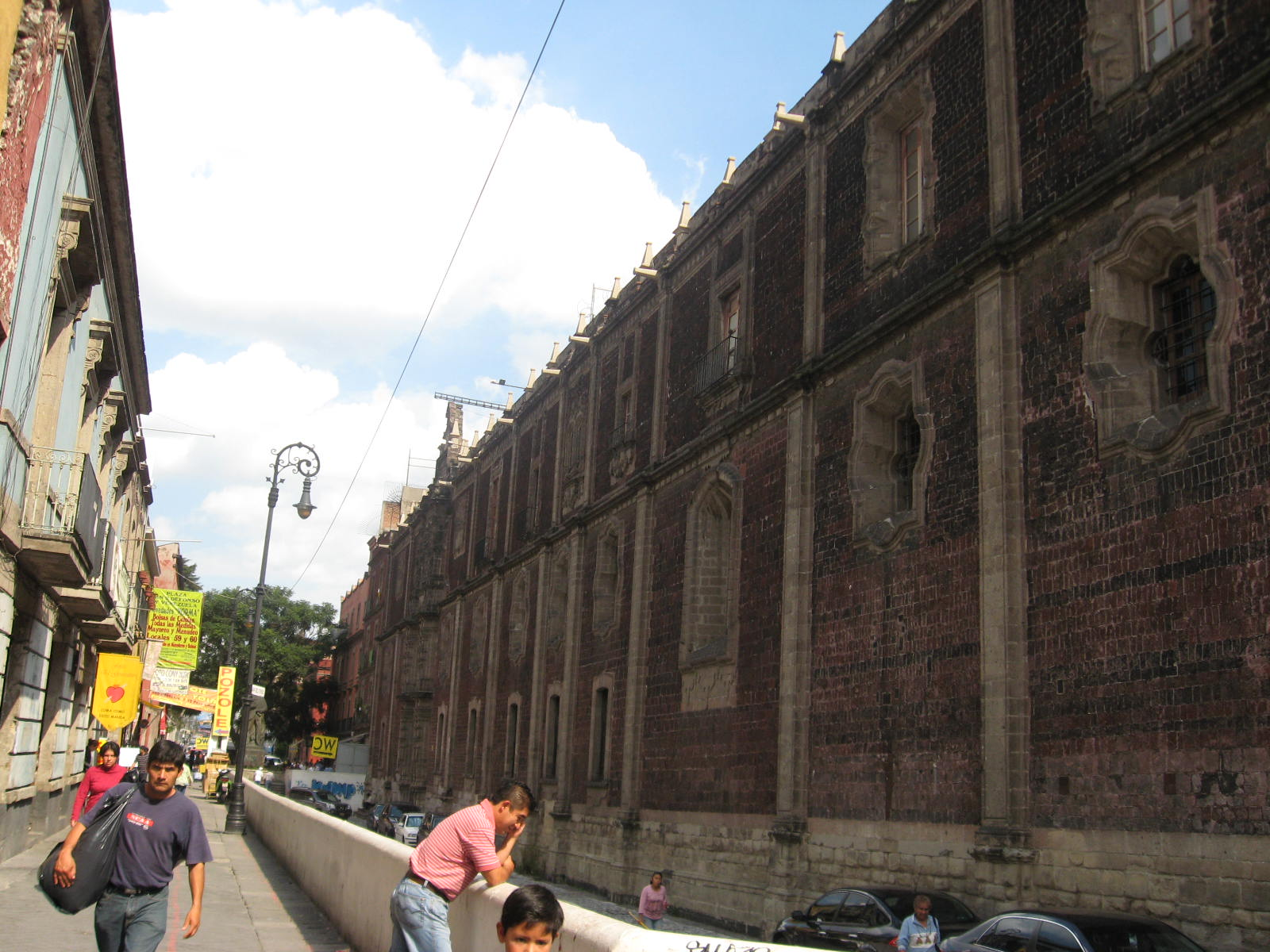
San Ildefonso Street, colonial facade

Although it no longer provides access inside the complex, the large facade that runs along almost the entire length of San Ildefonso Street is the original, with a wide pedestrian zone between it and the street. The facade is a long wall which is covered in tezontle, a blood-red porous volcanic stone, with windows and doors arranged unevenly and pilasters dividing the façade horizontally. These windows and doors are framed with jambs and lintels in cantera, a grayish-white stone. Vertical pilasters made of chiluca, another kind of white stone, divide the facade, which has two levels with the lower one being larger. Most of the facade belongs to the Colegio Grande, or the original section of the college.

There are two extremely large portals done in cantera with supporting relieves done in "tecali", a very white, almost transparent marble. On the far left of the pedestrian zone is the stone portal of the Colegio Chico. This is the oldest intact section of facade, and it is adorned with estipite (inverted truncated pyramid) pilasters. Either they or the estipite designs on the Kings Altar of the cathedral are the first use of this design in New Spain. This portal has a relief named La imposición de la casulla a san Ildefonsus ("Putting on the chasuble on Saint Ildephonsus of Toledo") and opens to a hall that leads to the largest patio.

The portal leading to the Colegio Chico has a relief called El patrocinio de san Jose los Jesuitas (Saint Joseph as patron of the Jesuits) as well as one called Virgen del Rosario (Our Lady of the Rosary) both done in tecali. This portal opens to a hall that leads to a smaller patio.

=== Colegio Grande ===
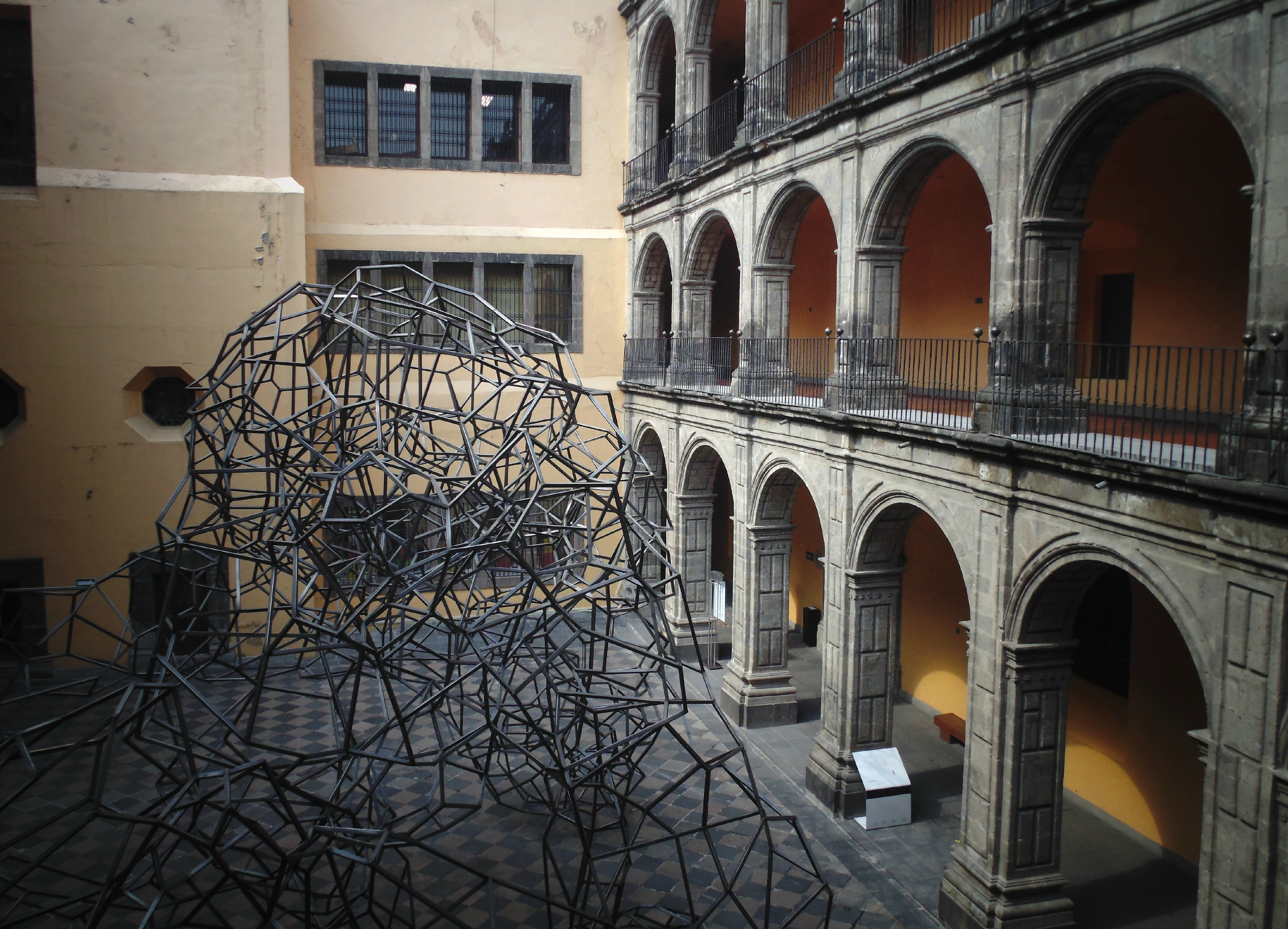
View to the

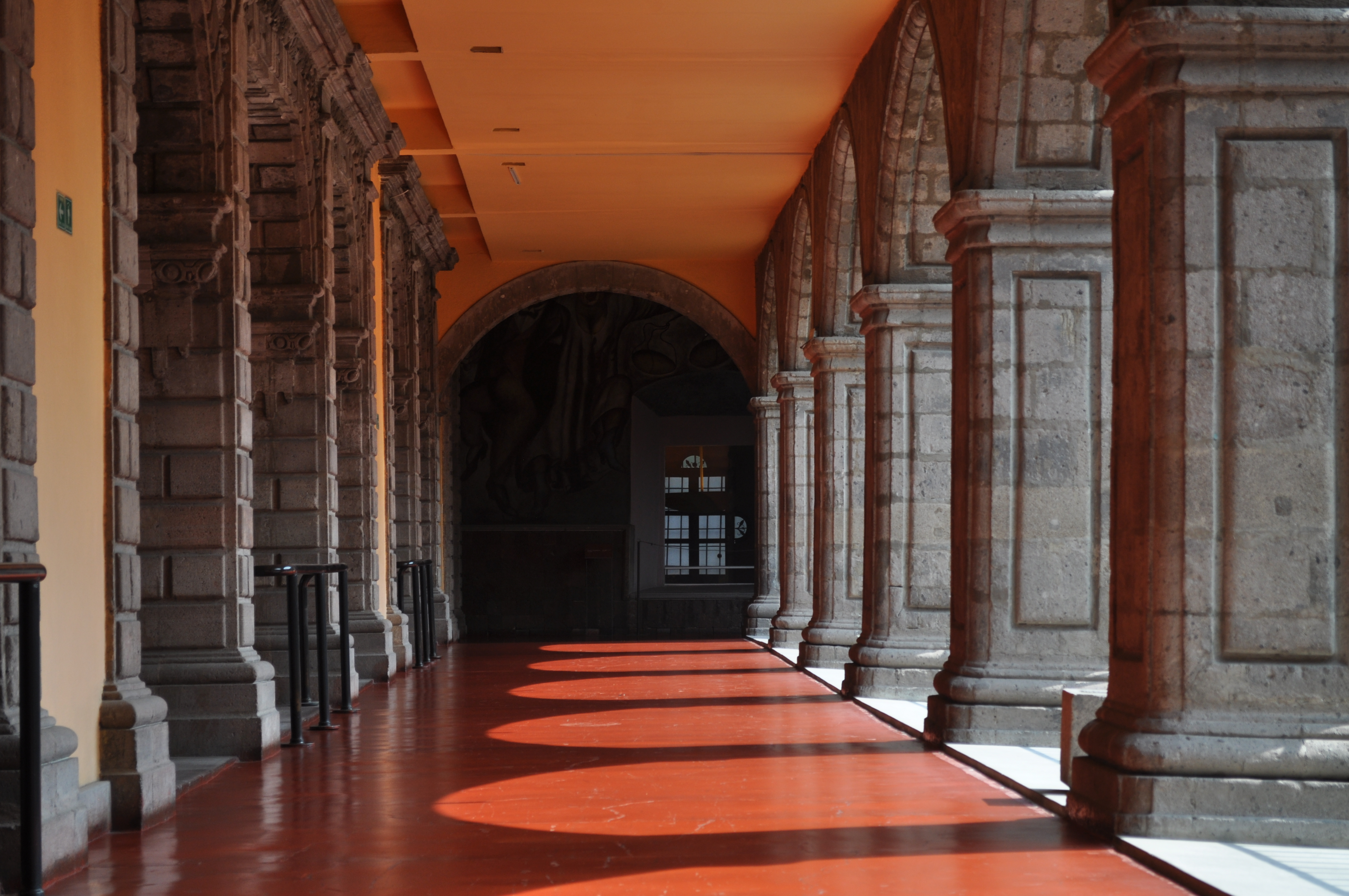
Colonial baroque arches

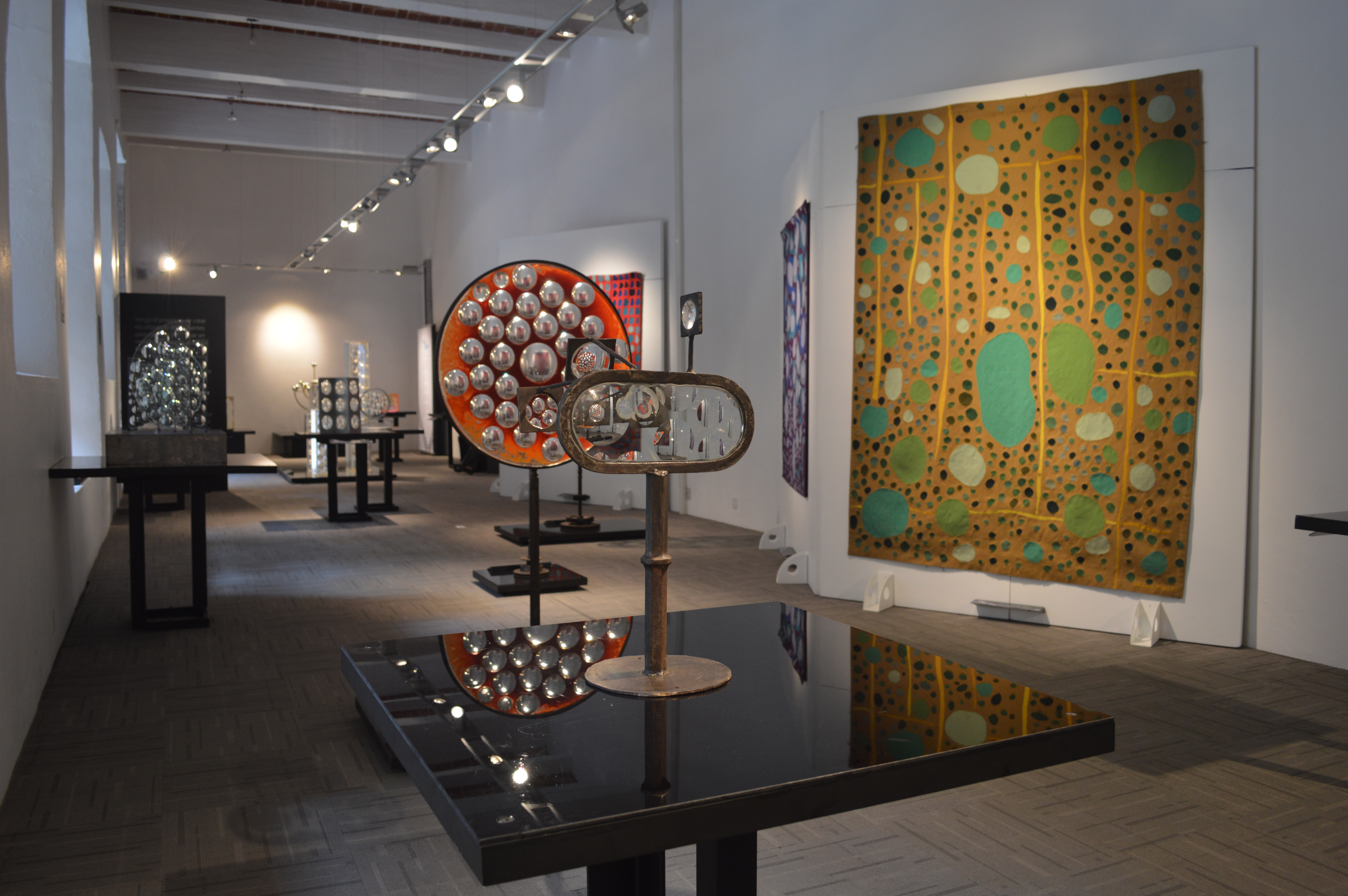
The museum has temporary exhibitions of diverse topics like for example this

Colegio Grande or Large College is the largest and original portion of the complex. It consists of one large patio, surrounded on all four sides by simple rounded arches, hallways, and rooms and one smaller patio called the "Patio de los Pasantes." The school part has three floors with a monumental staircase and contains most of the mural work done at San Ildefonso, and most of this was done by José Clemente Orozco between 1922 and 1927.

In what was once the portico, there is a mural by Ramón Alva de la Canal entitled The Spanish Landing and Planting of the Cross on New Land done in 1922. This fresco is considered to be the first of "The New School" of painting dealing with a specific point of Mexican history. On the opposite wall of the portico is the Allegory of the Virgin of Guadalupe by Fermin Revueltas. During the commission of this work, after not being paid for a number of weeks, Revueltas staged a kind of a strike at the school. Armed with a pistol and being somewhat drunk, he forced the porter to close the doors of the school. Since neither students nor teachers could enter the school, classes were suspended. The situation was resolved when David Alfaro Siqueiros met with Education Minister José Vasconcelos to arrange payment in gold coins. The story ends with both Siqueiros and Revueltas spending the money at a local cantina.

From the large patio of the Colegio Grande, one can see murals done by Orozco on all three floors. In the second floor corridor is a piece by Orozco called The Old Order which is considered a satirical work and The Trench which is considered one of his best works. On the third floor corridor is another series of murals by Orozco known as New Ideals.

The staircase connecting the three floors also contains Orozco's mural The Origin of Spanish America, but the upper portion of the staircase contains works by other artists. The southern wall of the stairway leading to the third floor is occupied by a mural by French artist Jean Charlot entitled The Conquest of Tenochtitlan. This work covers an aspect of Aztec history for the first time and is also noted for the use of metallic encrustations on the necklaces worn by Aztec lords. The northern wall contains a work called The Festivities of the Lord of Chalma by Fernando Leal. The work is noted for its use of bright color on the dancers and is considered a notable example of Neo-Baroque style.

=== Chapel ===
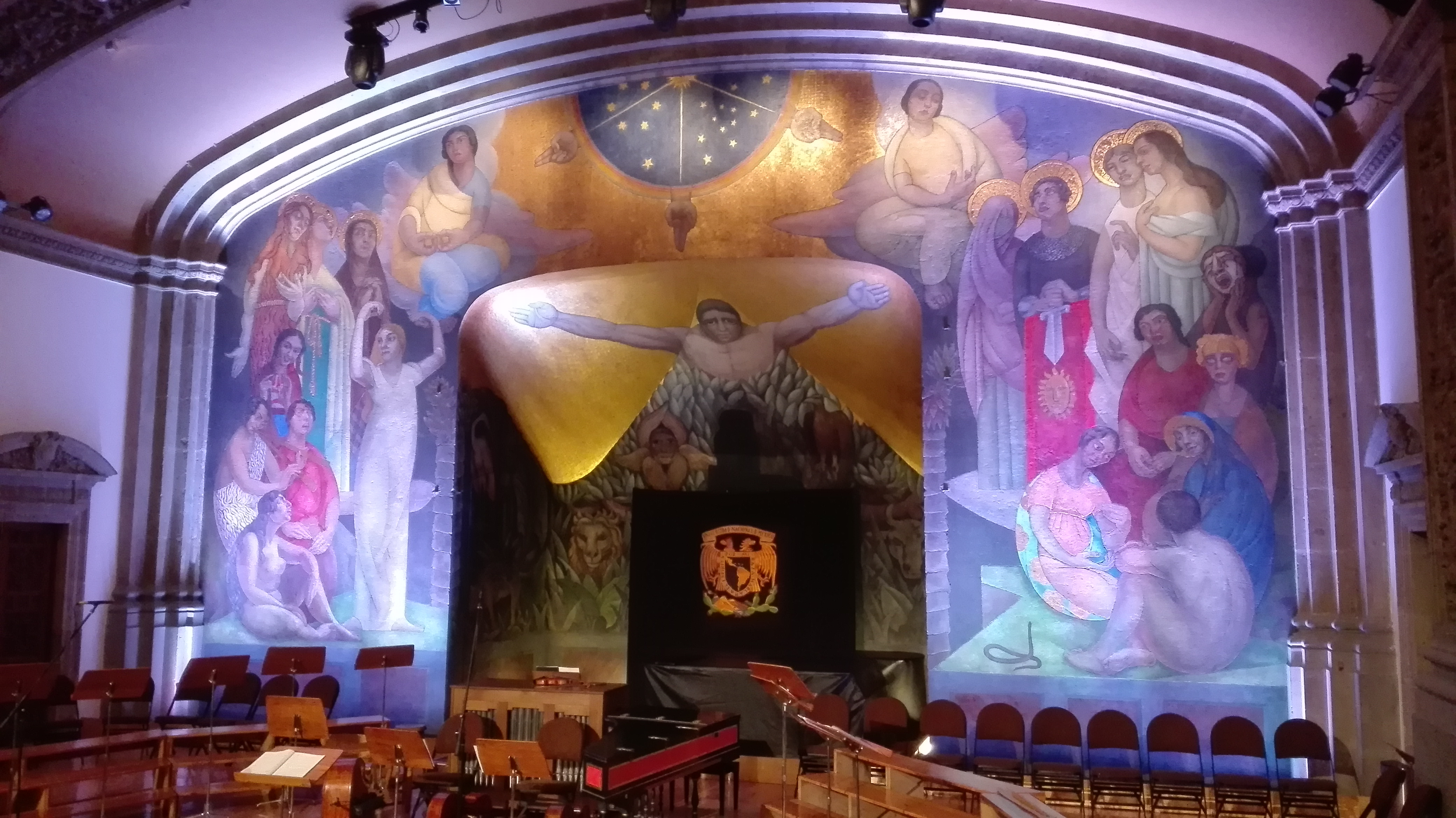
The Creation Mural, the first elaborated by Diego Rivera (en 1922), inside the Simón Bolívar Amphitheater, in the Old School of San Ildefonso (then of the National Preparatory School, of the then called National University of Mexico; today one of the cultural centers of the National Autonomous University of Mexico), the Historic Center of Mexico City.

On one side of the hallway leading from the portal to the patio, there is the old chapel. This chapel was used as a library during the years that this was the preparatory school. This chapel contains a number of paintings.

=== El Generalito ===
On the other side of the hallway, to the left of the "La Tinchera" mural, is "El Generalito" (the little general) the general assembly room of the Preparatory School. This room got its nickname because despite its small size, it was still the room used for all major assemblies. It contains the elaborately carved choir stalls that belonged to the Convent of San Agustin, created by Salvador Ocampo with relief work in wood. These stalls were probably created sometime in the last third of the 17th century. They were brought, refurbished, and installed here in 1890. In addition to a number of paintings, this room also has an elaborately carved professor's chair that was made for the Preparatory School.

=== Patio de los Pasantes ===
The smaller courtyard of the Colegio Grande is called the "Patio de los Pasantes." Pasantes (lit. "those who have passed") were those students who had completed all classes but needed to write their theses. When students reached this point, they were housed in this side of the building. It has only three sides with arches, with the fourth side being a blank wall. Otherwise, this patio is similar to the larger one.

=== Colegio Chico ===
While the Colegio Chico has undergone significant modifications since it was built onto the main college in the 18th century, it remains intact to this day. From the Colegio Chico entrance there is a simple stairwell. Siqueiros (muralist) painted the sides of this stairwell from 1922 to 1924, but he never finished the work. Furthermore, much of the work was lost during later renovations. Only a work on the stairwell's ceiling, called The Elements, survives intact.

=== Amphitheater Bolívar ===
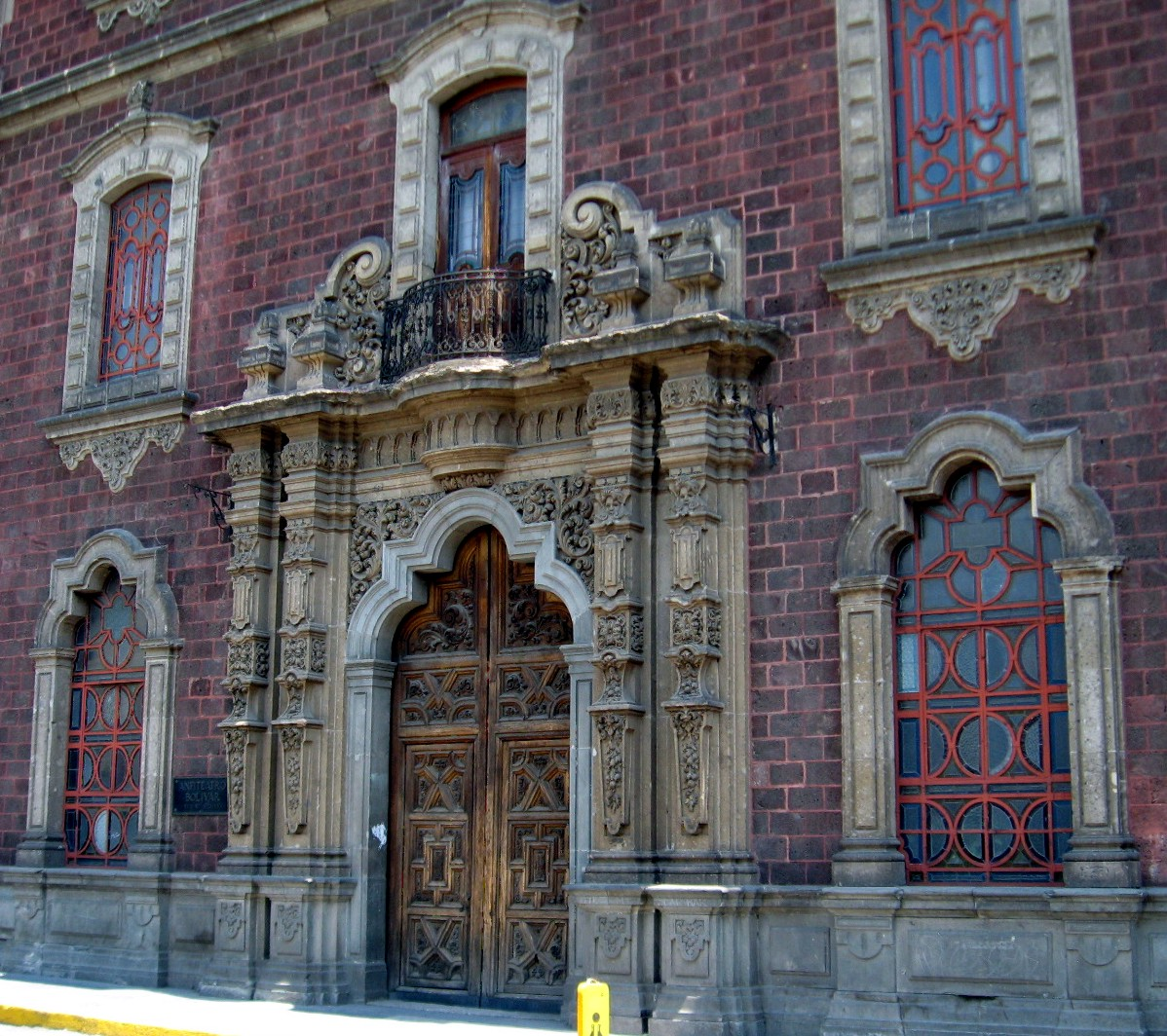
Main portal of the Bolívar Amphitheater, neo-baroque

The portals of the San Ildefonso Street side of the complex are no longer open for public access. The entrance to the complex is now on Justo Sierra Street through the Simón Bolívar Amphitheater. In 1906, due to the growth of the Preparatory School, a new building was ordered for the land against and behind the Colegio Grande. The amphitheatre was built by architect Samuel Chavez between 1906 and 1911. Another building that served as the dean's offices was finished in 1931 and designed by architect Pablo Flores. Both the amphitheatre and the dean's offices were designed to copy the Baroque style of the rest of the complex but, according to critics, both contain a significant number of design errors.

The lobby leading from the Just Sierra entrance has a double arcade decorated with elaborate Neo-Churrigueresque details. One the left is a fresco painted by Fernando Leal between 1931 and 1933. Named Epopeya bolivariana, it is a historical piece done in nine panels depicting the heroes that fought for independence in the various countries of the Americas.

Inside the Bolívar Amphitheater itself, one of Diego Rivera's early murals The Creation is exhibited. Despite the mixture of styles and concepts, this mural contains some of the features that would become Rivera trademarks: generous curves in the human form, Mexican nationalist elements, geometric structure of the composition, and groupings of famous persons. Other paintings here include works by Emilio Garcia Cahera, Ernesto García Cabral, and Angel Bolivar.

== Notable alumni ==
- José Joaquin Jimeno (1804–1856), missionary

== See also ==
- List of Jesuit sites
