= Universidad Metropolitana Xalapa =

Coordinates: 19.5349°N 96.9258°W

The Universidad Metropolitana Xalapa is a university in the city of Xalapa, Veracruz, Mexico. This university offers 4 year degrees in several courses including: Business Administration, Public Accounting, International Business, Marketing, Industrial Relations, Law, Pedagogy, Architecture, English, and Tourism. Fall and Spring semester learning is available.
