= Mireya Cueto =

Mexican puppeteer, writer and dramaturg (1922–2013)

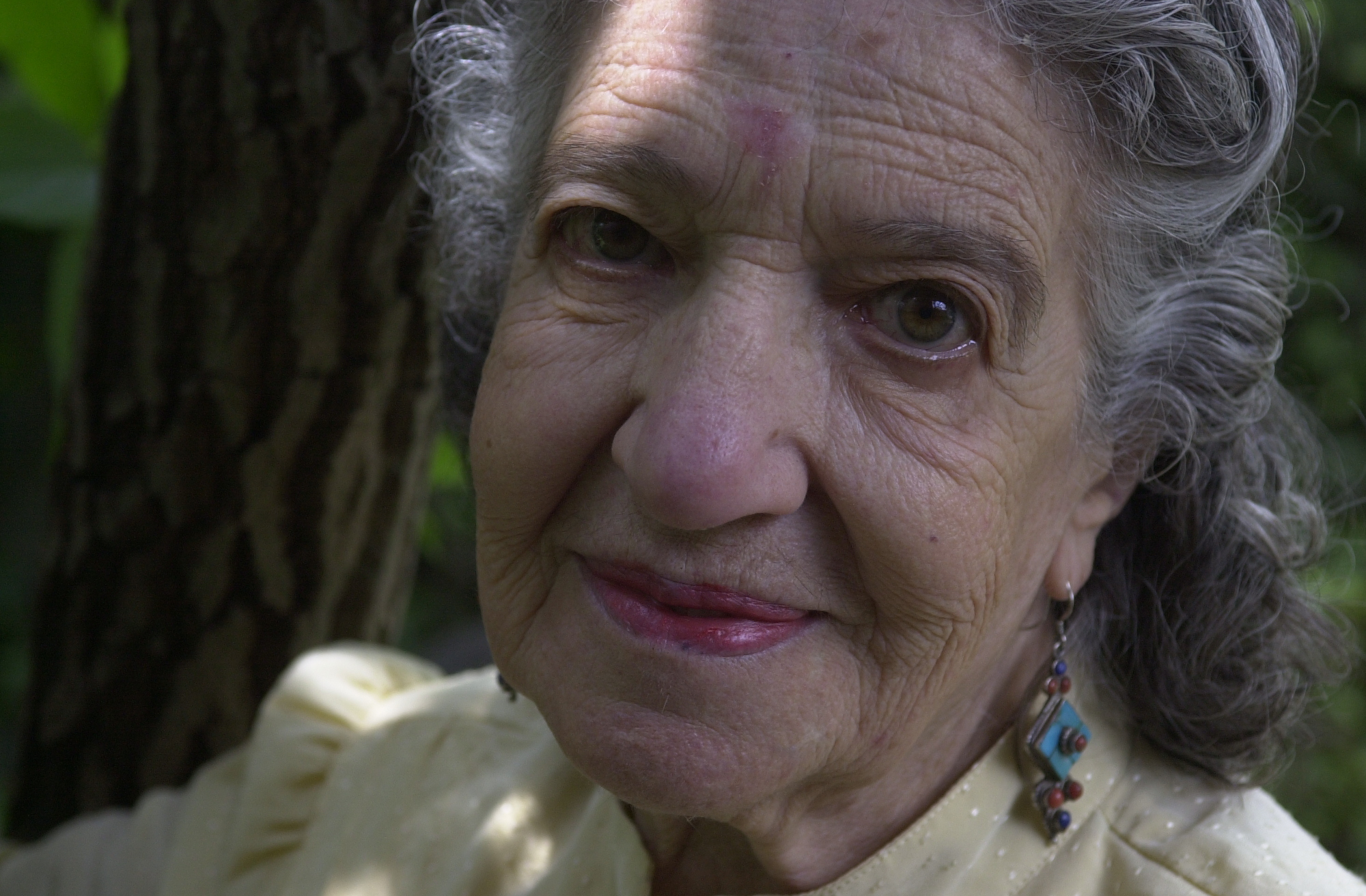
- Born: 3 February 1922; Mexico City, Mexico
- Died: 26 April 2013 (aged 91)
- Parents: Germán Cueto (father); Lola Cueto (mother)
- Awards: international "Gorgorito" award of the UNIMA, 2006

Mireya Cueto (February 3, 1922 – April 26, 2013) was a Mexican puppeteer, writer and dramaturg. She was also co-founder of the national marionette museum Museo Nacional de Títeres (MUNATI) in Huamantla, Tlaxcala.

== Biography ==
Cueto, born on February 3, 1922, in Mexico City, is one of two daughters of artists Lola and Gérman, who were also well-known puppeteers.

Since 2001, the Consejo Nacional para la Cultura y las Artes (CONACULTA) has carried out annually the national puppetry festival "Festival Nacional de Títeres Mireya Cueto" in honor of her. She died on April 26, 2013.
