= Arqueles Vela =

Mexican writer

Arqueles Vela (Guatemala/Tapachula 1899 – Mexico City 1977) was a Mexican writer, journalist and teacher, of Guatemalan origin. He was one of the major members of the Stridentism movement and author of La señorita Etcétera (1922), one of the earliest avant-garde narrative works.

He used to publish some articles with the pen-name "Silvestre Paradox" in the Mexican newspaper "El Universal Ilustrado", even though other journalists published with that pen-name too.

== Works ==
=== Poetry and narrative ===
- El sendero gris y otros poemas inútiles (1920)
- La señorita Etcétera (1922)
- El café de nadie (1926)
- Un crimen provisional (1926)
- El intrasferible (1927; published again in 1977)
- El viaje redondo (1929)
- Cantata a las muchachas fuertes y alegres de México (1940)
- Cuentos del día y de la noche (1945)
- La volanda (1956)
- El picaflor (1961)
- Luzbel (1966)

=== Essays ===
- Introducción, organización, interpretación y dirección del teatro de muñecos, Historia materialista del arte (1936).
- Evolución histórica de la literatura universal (1941).
- El arte y la estética (1945).
- Teoría literaria del modernismo (1949).
- Elementos del lenguaje y didáctica de la expresión (1953).
- Fundamentos de la literatura mexicana (1953).
- Análisis de la expresión literaria (1965).
