= Germán List Arzubide =

Mexican poet and revolutionary

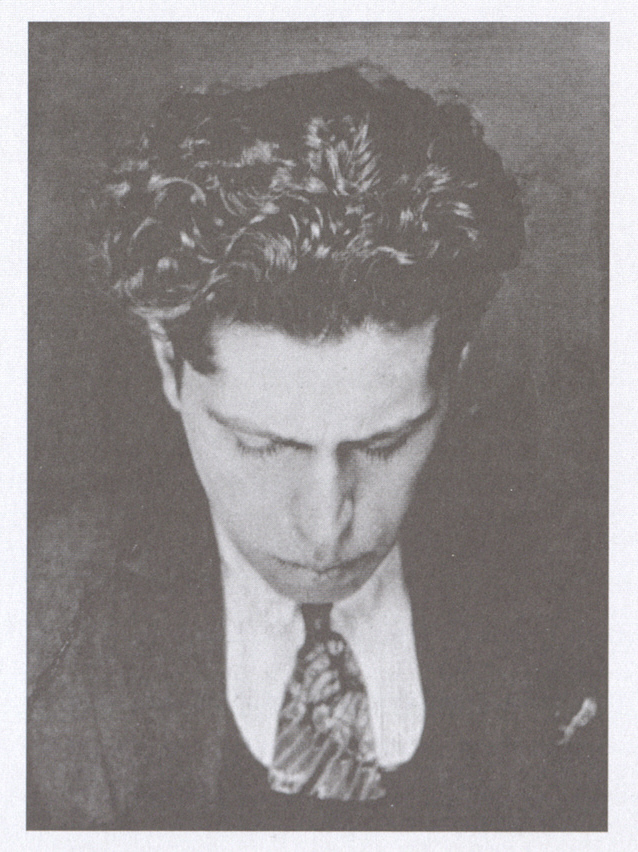
Germán List Arzubide

Germán List Arzubide (31 May 1898 – 17 October or 19 October 1998) was a Mexican poet and revolutionary.

Born in Puebla, he was an active participant in the Revolution, fighting alongside Emiliano Zapata as well as extolling him and other revolutionary leaders in his poetry. He was wounded and jailed three times, the first occasion providing the inspiration for his very first poem, a mocking caricature of his jailer. He wrote biographies of both Zapata (Exaltacion, published in 1927) and another assassinated revolutionary leader Francisco Madero (Madero, el Mexico de 1910, published in 1973). According to the poet James Kirkup, who wrote an obituary of List upon his death: "The literary work of List and his contemporaries, both poets and novelists (including Martin Luis Guzman and Mariano Azuela), create the best picture of those passionate uprisings."

List Arzubide was one of the major members of Stridentism and, with Manuel Maples Arce, redacted and gave out the second stridentist manifesto in the city of Puebla. He also wrote a comprehensive account of the movement, titled El movimiento estridentista (1926), remarkable because it is, at the same time, a history, a defence and a literary work. His other work, Practica de educación irreligiosa (1936), is listed in the Index Librorum Prohibitorum. In 1933, List Arzubide wrote Troka el Poderoso, a children's educational radio program that aired on the station XFX. The show incorporated Stridentist themes into the narrative, which centered on a robot named Troka replacing old technology and the natural world with modern science. List Arzubide also wrote plays for the state-sponsored, politically didactic puppet show tour, Teatro Guiñol.

He was a close friend of the painter Fernando Leal, who portrayed him as one of the characters of his cycle of frescoes dedicated to Bolivar's Epic.

In one of his last interviews he said: "I want to die smiling, as I expect to do soon, since I don't want to continue abusing life, especially when the doctors have taken all the fun away by forbidding me alcohol and women."

He died in Mexico City at the age of 100, one of the last survivors of the Revolution.
