= Fermín Revueltas Sánchez =

Mexican painter and activist (1901–1935)

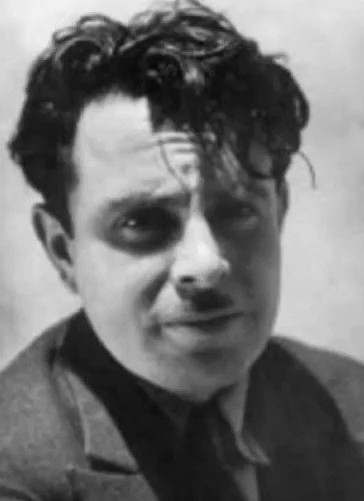
- Portrait of Fermín Revueltas Sánchez
- Born: July 7, 1901; Santiago Papasquiaro
- Died: September 7, 1935 (aged 34); Mexico City
- Known for: Painting
- Movement: Mexican muralism, Stridentism

Fermín Revueltas Sánchez (July 7, 1901 in Santiago Papasquiaro – September 7, 1935 in Mexico City) was a Mexican painter.

== Biography ==
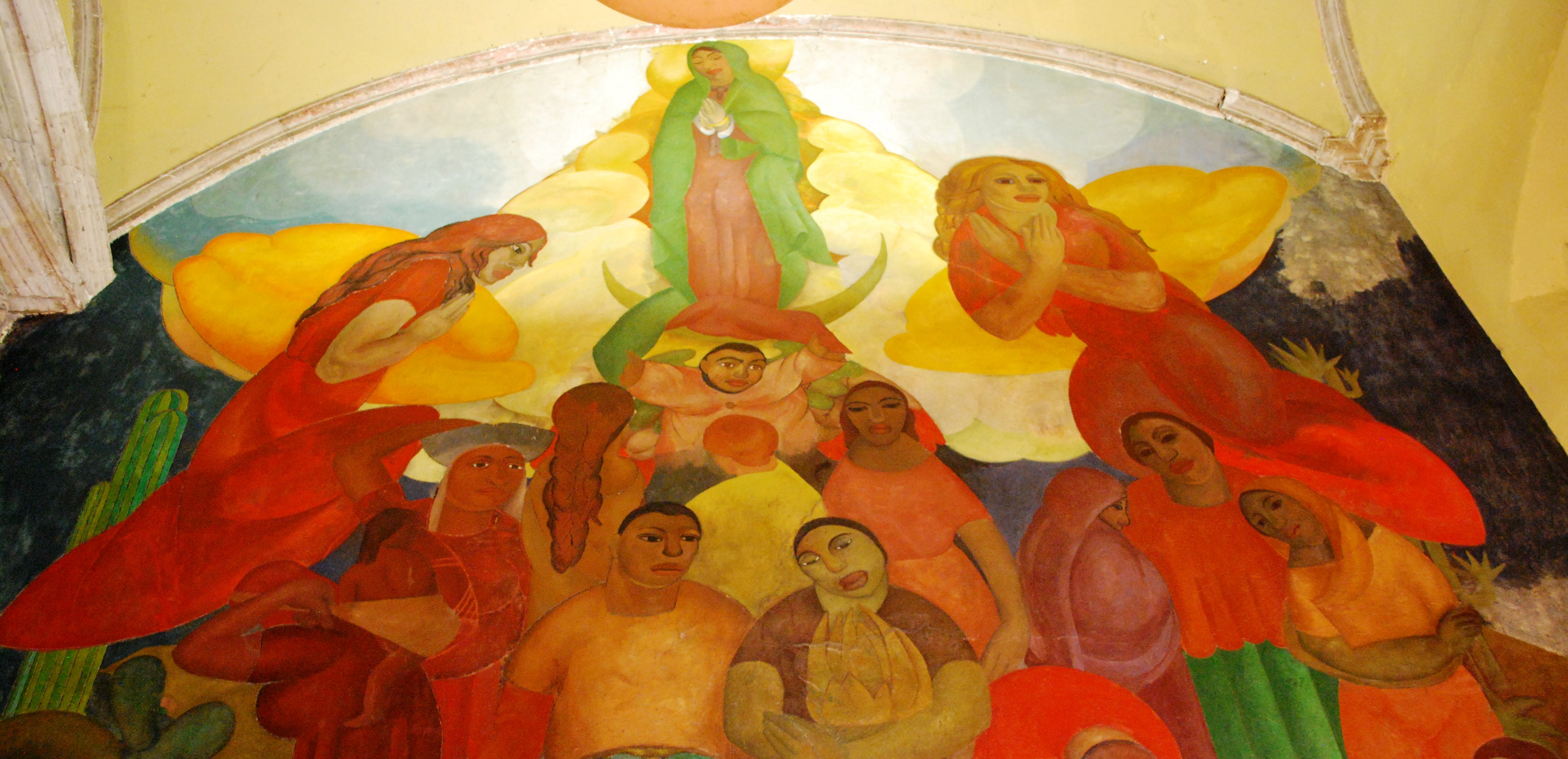
A portion of Alegoría a la Virgen de Guadalupe by Fermín Revueltas located in one of the walls of the San Ildefonso College.

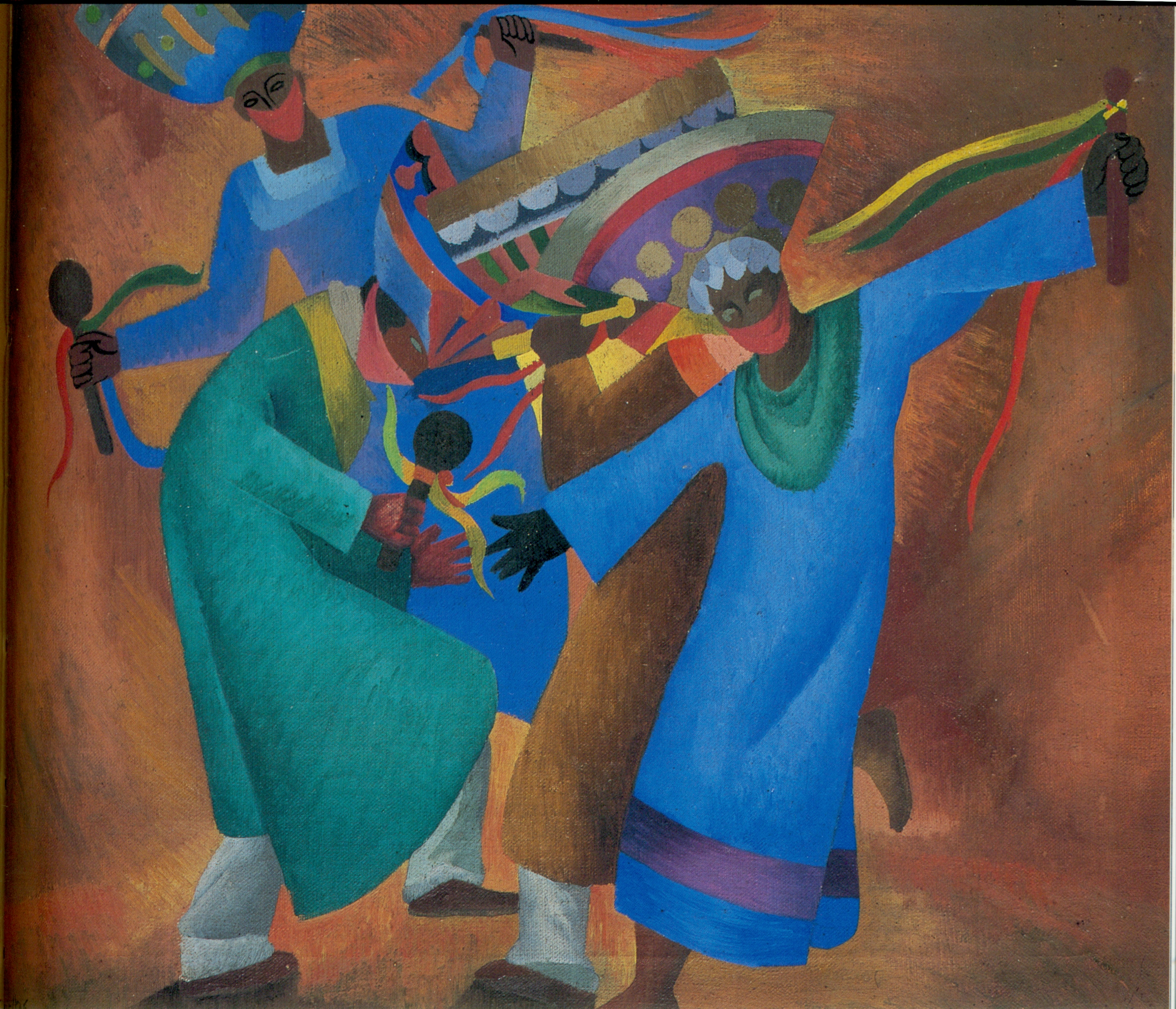
Dance of Yautepec

Fermín Revueltas was son of Gregorio Revueltas Gutiérrez and his wife Romana Sánchez Arias. The Revueltas Sánchez family came from the North of Mexico, and lived in Guadalajara, Jalisco, from 1910 to 1913. Due to the Mexican Revolution, the father decided that Fermín and his brother Silvestre had to visit school in the United States. He attended St. Edward's College from 1917 to 1920, and afterwards he continued his studies in Chicago. Back in Mexico, Fermín Revueltas visited the open-air painting school in Coyoacán. He became director of the "José María Velasco" school in Guadalupe, a part of Mexico City, and in 1923 he painted murals at the Escuela Nacional Preparatoria alongside others. In 1928 he joined the Partido Comunista Mexicano. Revueltas participated in several artist groups, amongst others he joined the Stridentism movement, and was member of the ¡30-30! group. His photographs and photomontages were published in El Maestro Rural, a magazine published by the Secretariat of Public Education. When he died at the age of 34 years, many of his works were unfinished.

In 1991, Javier Audirac filmed a documentary about him, entitled Fermín Revueltas o El color (Fermín Revueltas or The color).

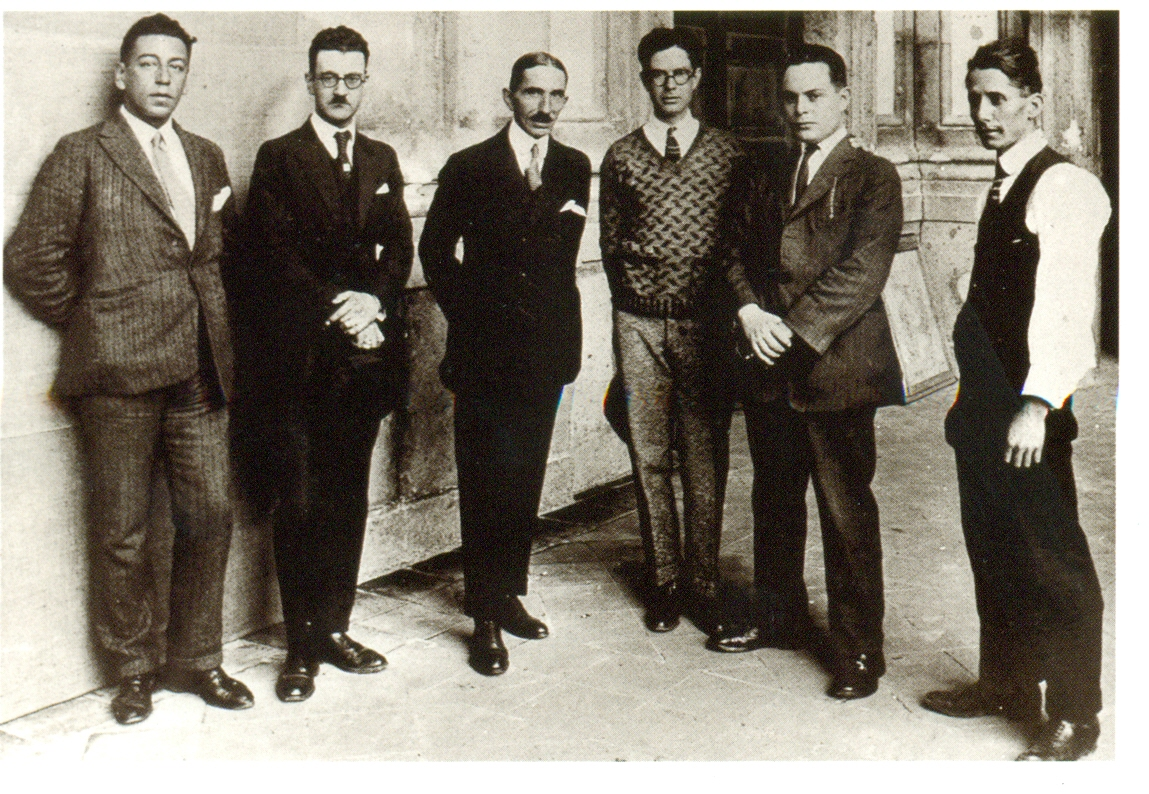
With the stridentists

== Bibliography ==
Zurián, Carla. Fermín Revueltas. Constructor de espacios, México: Editorial RM - INBA, 2002.
