= Jean Charlot =

Painter and illustrator (1898–1979)

- Born: Louis Henri Jean Charlot; February 8, 1898; Paris, France
- Died: March 20, 1979 (aged 81); Honolulu, Hawaii, U.S.
- Known for: Fresco, lithography, murals, sculpture
- Movement: Mexican Mural Movement
- Spouse: Zohmah Day
- Awards: Guggenheim Fellowships, National Council on the Arts, Living Treasures of Hawai'i
- Website: jeancharlot.org

Louis Henri Jean Charlot (English: /ʃɑːrˈloʊ/ shar-LOH, French: [lwi ɑ̃ʁi ʒɑ̃ ʃaʁlo]; February 8, 1898 – March 20, 1979) was a French-born American painter and illustrator, active mainly in Mexico and the United States.

== Life ==
Charlot was born in Paris. His father, Henri, owned an import-export business and was a Russian-born émigré, albeit one who supported the Bolshevik cause. His mother Anna was an artist. His mother's family originated from Mexico City; his grandfather was a French-Indian mestizo. His great-grandfather had immigrated to Mexico in the 1820s shortly after the country's independence from Spain, and married a woman who was half-Aztec.

From an early age Charlot was fascinated with the Mexican manuscripts and art in the collection of his great uncle Eugene, and by the pre-Columbian artefacts of a neighbor and family friend, Désiré Charnay, who was a well-known archaeologist. As a teenager, he began learning Nahuatl. He studied art in Paris before serving in the French Army during World War I. In 1920, his scale drawings for the mural decorations of a church were included in an exhibition of religious art at the Louvre.

Charlot spent an extensive period of his life living and working in Mexico. In 1921, after his father died, he and his mother left Europe to settle in Mexico City. He met Fernando Leal (1896–1964) and shared his studio with him. Charlot was deemed "a fine person who is doing important work" by Diego Rivera, the renowned Mexican painter and muralist. Rivera introduced Charlot to other young artists, such as Pablo O'Higgins (born Paul Stevenson Higgins and who came to live in Mexico in 1924, having grown up in Salt Lake City, Utah). O'Higgins would later recall that he met Charlot at the former's studio, when he was painting a nude of Luz Jiménez, a very beautiful Mexican Indian woman who modeled for Diego Rivera. Luz's native language was Nahuatl, which she taught to Charlot as she posed for him. Charlot and O'Higgins shared an interest in learning about Mexico and traveled together exploring the country, sometimes with Anita Brenner, a Jewish 19-year-old at that time, with whom Charlot seemed in love and collaborated in several literary and illustration projects.

Charlot married a close friend of O'Higgins, Dorothy Day, an artist who had also grown up in Salt Lake City. Her family was Mormon but later left the church. At age twenty, Dorothy had changed her name to Zohmah and traveled to Mexico. She got involved in the Mexican art movement of the 1920s and 1930s, and became close friends with young Mexican and American artists, such as Charlot and O'Higgins, in the circle of Diego Rivera.

Charlot and O'Higgins had a long-lasting friendship, sharing their interest on each other's work even after Charlot went with his mother to live in New York in 1928. When in Mexico City, Charlot would stay in a humble room Pablo rented in downtown Mexico City on the roof of a dilapidated building on the street of Belisario Dominguez. In December 1930, to prepare for his solo exhibit in early 1931 at the John Levy Gallery in New York, O'Higgins lived with Charlot for six months in his small unheated apartment on Union Square and 14th Street, near the Art Students League, where Charlot was teaching. At the same time, mid-January 1931, a few blocks away, José Clemente Orozco was painting murals for The New School at 66 West 12th Street. Charlot and Orozco had maintained frequent correspondence in previous years.

Both commented on each other's murals in Hawaii in 1952.

In 1940, Charlot applied for and was accorded American citizenship. A dual citizen of the United States and France, he retained passports from both countries.

== Work ==
Charlot is generally recognized as having brought international attention to José Guadalupe Posada, a Mexican printer who had produced more than 15,000 prints and lithographs, devoted mostly to the popular readers of newspapers in pre-revolutionary Mexico, in which he would present political satires using cartoon-like skeletons; these are a variety of calavera. The original style and plastic language of Posada's art struck Charlot when he saw his prints being sold in 1922 on street corners, and he went on to find his forgotten printing blocks (woodcuts, leadcuts, zinccuts, etc.) in the workshop of Posada's former publisher. With O'Higgins and the son of Posada's publisher, Charlot participated in 1928 and 1930 in the publication of catalogues of Posada's prints, a project conceived by Frances Toor which piqued public interest in Posada. Posada's skeletons and skulls, rooted in pre-Hispanic religious ritual, were later adapted by Rivera, Frida Kahlo, O'Higgins, and many others, and are now icons acknowledged worldwide as being at the heart of Mexican popular art and handcrafts. Charlot himself was much interested in and also started avant-garde woodcut.

After the Mexican Revolution (1910–1917), post-revolutionary governments sought to educate the public on the principles of social justice, as consecrated in the new constitution. Mural painting became an extraordinary visual vehicle, for occupying public spaces like government buildings, schools and markets where it was accessible to all people and spoke even to the illiterate, in contrast to traditional easel painting aimed at private art consumption by the educated. During the government of President Álvaro Obregón (1921–1924), mural painting was actively promoted by Minister of Education Jose Vasconcelos. Diego Rivera's strong personality and political connections led to many important early commissions. His first commission from Vasconcelos was to paint a mural in the Preparatory School, where four young artists dared to accept Vasconcelos' challenge. Jean Charlot was one of them, and also his friend and roommate Fernando Leal who invited him to get involved. Charlot's fresco Massacre in the Templo Mayor (1921–1922), depicting the massacre in the Great Temple of Tenochtitlan, is in front of Fernando Leal's The Dancers of Chalma (1921–1923). In his fresco, Charlot portrayed himself, Leal and Diego Rivera. Charlot's was the first mural finished and the first in the fresco technique. Thus, Charlot participated in the founding of Mexican muralism.

The next project Rivera took on was in the Court of Labor at the Ministry of Education building; other young artists, including Charlot, Xavier Guerrero, and Amado de la Cueva, were assigned walls in the Court of Fiestas in the same building. Charlot considered it a first attempt at "communal painting". Rivera, however, eventually wrested control of the project, acquiring more space for himself and recasting the other artists in the role of assistants, even painting over one of Charlot's finished murals, Danza de los Listones (Dance of the Ribbons) to create room for his own Market Place. According to John Charlot, son of Jean, in the beginning only younger artists dared to undertake commissions for large mural paintings. While Vasconcelos himself preferred non-political allegorical works, he carefully avoided guiding the artists, who increasingly became more political in reflecting the ideas of the revolution.

In 1928, works by Charlot were included with those of 21 other artists (including Rivera, Orozco, O'Higgins, Siqueiros, and Carlos Mérida) in an exhibition at the Art Center Gallery in New York organized by Frances Flynn Paine, the manager of a Rockefeller fund to sponsor Mexican artists. The exhibition had the co-sponsorship of the Mexican Ministry of Education and the Mexican National University.

Between 1926 and 1928 Charlot spent three seasons deeply immersed in the excavation of Mayan temples at Chichen Itza. Hired by Sylvanus Morley of the Carnegie Institution and under the field direction of Earl H. Morris, Charlot meticulously traced and copied bas-reliefs and painted surfaces as they were unearthed, creating an invaluable guide to the reconstruction of some of the key structures of the temple complex. The work had a major influence on his own art, and led to a long friendship with Earl Morris and his wife Ann, a fellow painter-copyist at Chichen Itza. The Morrises took care of Charlot after his mother died in New York City in the winter of 1929, and together the three co-authored The Temple of the Warriors at Chichén Itzá, Yucatan, published in two volumes in 1931 and considered a classic in its field

Work and Rest, color lithograph by Charlot, 1956

In the U.S., Charlot executed commissions for the Work Projects Administration's Federal Arts Project, including the creation of murals for Straubenmuller Textile High School in Manhattan during 1934–1935, and, in 1942, an oil on canvas mural for the post office in McDonough, Georgia titled Cotton Gin, 4.5 ft × 11 ft (1.4 m × 3.4 m).

In 1944, Josef Albers invited Charlot to teach at the first Summer Institute of Black Mountain College. During his time there, Charlot completed two frescos, titled Inspiration and Knowledge (sometimes also called Study), on the pylons beneath the college's Studies Building. These frescos are likely the only intact artwork to remain on the historic site of Black Mountain College's Lake Eden campus.

Charlot went to Colorado Springs, Colorado in 1947 to take a job at the Colorado Springs Fine Arts Center, where he taught fresco painting and worked with Lawrence Barrett on several editions of lithographs. While there he also taught art at The Fountain Valley School, an independent school for boys (at that time), founded in 1930. Charlot left the Fine Arts Center in 1949 under a cloud of misunderstandings between himself and the Arts Center's Board of Trustees and the Art Center's director, Mitch Wilder. Charlot then went to teach at the University of Hawaii, where he stayed for over 30 years. There, he developed a close friendship with the world-famous local artist Madge Tennent and collaborated with Juliette May Fraser, an accomplished muralist in her own right, on several major commissions in and around Honolulu. During the summer of 1969, Charlot worked with Tony Smith at UH and Smith thanked him by creating a piece in the For... series named For J.C.

The Fine Arts Museums of San Francisco, the Cleveland Museum of Art, the Hawaii State Art Museum, the Honolulu Museum of Art, the Isaacs Art Center (Waimea, Hawaii), the East-West Center and the University of Hawaii at Manoa library are among the public collections having works by Jean Charlot.

In 1940 he illustrated the book Tito's Hats (Garden City Publishing), which was written by the future actor Mel Ferrer. Anthony Boucher and J. Francis McComas praised his 1951 collection of captioned drawings, Dance of Death, as "superlative macabre humor in a welcome modernization of a great ancient art-form." Charlot also illustrated the book Springtime, Tales of the cafe Rieu by J.B. Morton in 1956.

In 1972, Charlot published An Artist on Art: Collected Essays of Jean Charlot, which discussed Mexican art history.

== Selected works ==
- 1923: Massacre in the Main Temple, 14 by 26, fresco at the Colegio de San Ildefonso.
- 1949: Cargadore: Danza de los Listones, and Lavanderas, frescos at the Secretaria de Educación, México.
- 1924: Shield of the National University of Mexico, with Eagle and Condor, 16 by 20 in., fresco at the Biblioteca Pan-Americana, México.
- 1935: Head, Crowned with Laurels, 16 by 20 in., fresco at the Strauben-Muller Textile High School, New York.
- 1944: Inspiration and Knowledge (or Study), 5 by 5 ft., frescos on pylons of the New Studies Building, Black Mountain College (renamed: Camp Rockmont for Boys), Black Mountain, North Carolina.
- 1949: Relation of Man and Nature in Old Hawaii, 10 by 29 ft., fresco at the University of Hawai'i-Manoa, Honolulu, Hawaii.
- 1952: Early Contacts of Hawaii with the Outer World, 11 by 57 ft., fresco at the Bishop Bank, Honolulu, Hawaii.
Hala Grove, Kahuwai, Hawaii, serigraph by Charlot, Hawaii State Art Museum

Woman Standing with Child on Back, color lithograph by Charlot

== General and cited sources ==
- Aronov, Elliot (2003). Honolulu Printmakers 75th Anniversary: A Tradition of Gift Prints. Honolulu: Honolulu Academy of Arts in association with Honolulu Printmakers. pp. 31 & 40. ISBN 9780937426586. OCLC 52933399.
- Charlot, Jean (1972). An Artist on Art: Collected Essays of Jean Charlot. Honolulu: University Press of Hawaii. ISBN 9780870221187. OCLC 489472.
- "Jean Charlot". A Tradition of Excellence. Department of Art, University of Hawaiʻi at Mānoa. 2002. pp. 32–35. OCLC 49661693. A catalog for "An exhibition of work by retired faculty, University of Hawaiʻi Art Gallery, March 10 to April 12, 2002."
- Department of Education, State of Hawaii (January 1985). "Jean Charlot". Artists of Hawaii. Honolulu: Office of Instructional Services/General Education Branch, Dept. of Education, State of Hawaii. pp. 15–22. OCLC 13099980.
- Haar, Francis; Neogy, Prithwish (1974). Artists of Hawaii. Vol. 1: Nineteen Painters and Sculptors. Honolulu: State Foundation on Culture & the Arts. ISBN 9780824803384. OCLC 1185874.
- McVicker, Donald (1999). "The Painter-Turned-Archaeologist: Jean Charlot at Chichen Itza" (PDF). library.manoa.hawaii.edu. Translated from:
  - Charlot, Jean; González Rubio, Javier; Koprivitza, Milena; Garduño Pulido, Blanca; Crister, Harry B; Colegio de San Ildefonso (México); Museo de Monterrey (Nuevo León: México) (1994). "El pintor convertido en arqueólogo: Jean Charlot en Chichén Itzá". México en la obra de Jean Charlot (in Spanish). Ciudad de México, DDF, México: Consejo Nacional para la Cultura y las Artes. pp. 57–72. ISBN 9789682958250. OCLC 30919978.
- "Recommended Reading". The Magazine of Fantasy & Science Fiction. Cornwall, CT: Mercury Press, etc. April 1952. ISSN 1095-8258. OCLC 1014255744.
- Morse, Peter (1978). Popular Art: The Example of Jean Charlot. Santa Barbara, CA: Capra Press. ISBN 9780884960782. OCLC 3748205.
- Orozco, José (2010) [1974]. The Artist in New York: Letters to Jean Charlot and Unpublished Writings, 1925–1929. Austin: University of Texas Press. ISBN 9780292760585. OCLC 835742533, 948224301.
- Radford, Georgia; Radford, Warren; Golt, Rick (1978). Sculpture in the Sun: Hawaii's Art for Open Spaces. Honolulu: University Press of Hawaii. p. 982. ISBN 9780824805265. OCLC 4005107.
- Tuck, Donald H. (1974). The Encyclopedia of Science Fiction and Fantasy Through 1968: A Bibliographic Survey of the Fields of Science Fiction Fantasy and Weird Fiction Through 1968 (1st ed.). Chicago: Advent. p. 98. ISBN 0-911682-20-1.
- Vogel, Susan (2010). Becoming Pablo O'Higgins. San Francisco: Pince-Nez Press. ISBN 9781930074217. OCLC 618741723.
- Yoshihara, Lisa A. (1997). Collective Visions, 1967–1997: An Exhibition Celebrating the 30th Anniversary of the State Foundation on Culture and the Arts, Art in Public Places Program, Presented at the Honolulu Academy of Arts, September 3–October 12, 1997. Honolulu: Honolulu Academy of Arts. p. 16. OCLC 37890571.
