= Arturo García Bustos =

Mexican painter and print maker

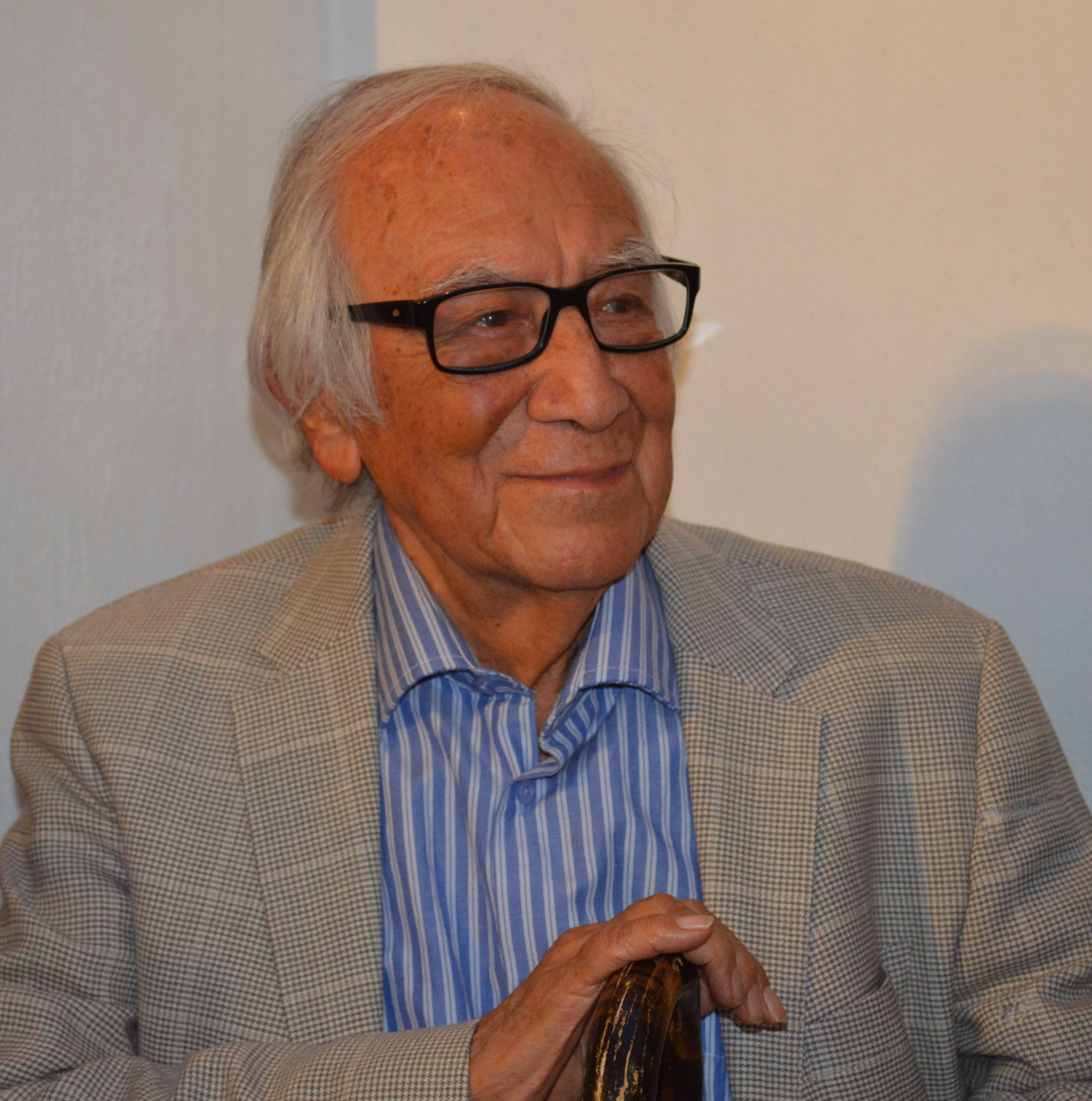
- Arturo García Bustos speaking at a book presentation in the Palacio de Bellas Artes
- Born: August 8, 1926; Mexico City, Mexico
- Died: April 7, 2017 (aged 90); Mexico City, Mexico
- Education: Escuela Nacional de Artes Plásticas
- Known for: Painting; Printmaking
- Notable work: Oaxaca en la historia y en el mito
- Movement: Visual artist
- Spouse: Rina Lazo (m. 1949–2017)

Arturo García Bustos (August 8, 1926 – April 7, 2017) was a Mexican painter and print maker. He is known as one of “Los Fridos” students who studied under Frida Kahlo at her home in Coyoacán.

== Life ==
Video interview (in Spanish) with the artist done by students of Tec de Monterrey, Mexico City campus

Arturo García Bustos was born in Mexico City, near the Zócalo. He grew up during the time when Mexican muralism was dominant, which drew him to art. After attending high school at the Escuela Nacional Preparatoria Núm 1, specializing in architecture, he entered the Escuela Nacional de Artes Plásticas in 1941, at age fifteen. The following year (1943) he entered the Escuela de Pintura y Escultura ("La Esmeralda") where his teachers were Frida Kahlo, Feliciano Peña, Agustín Lazo and María Izquierdo, studying there for five years. During his career he studied printmaking as well, including courses in printmaking with Korean artist Wan Jon Ja in Pyongyang and Chinese printing in Beijing in 1957.

García Bustos’ social life when he was younger revolved around the circles of Diego Rivera and Frida Kahlo, even meeting his wife, Rina Lazo through the famous couple. He married her in 1949.

The couple were married for over 60 years until Arturo died. They lived in the Coyoacán borough of Mexico City in a colonial house called Casa Colorada, on Calle de Vallarta in the La Conchita neighborhood. Their home is said to be a residence of La Malinche. It was later a monastery, prison and hospital. After living there for more than forty years, in 2006, they opened part of it on the ground floor to house the Galería de la Casa Colorado. This gallery is run by the couple's only daughter, Rina García Lazo, who is an architect specializing in the restoration of monuments.

Bustos died in Mexico City on April 7, 2017. His last exhibition took place at Universidad Iberoamericana. This was a cooperative display by him and his wife, and was mounted by alumni from the Art History major.

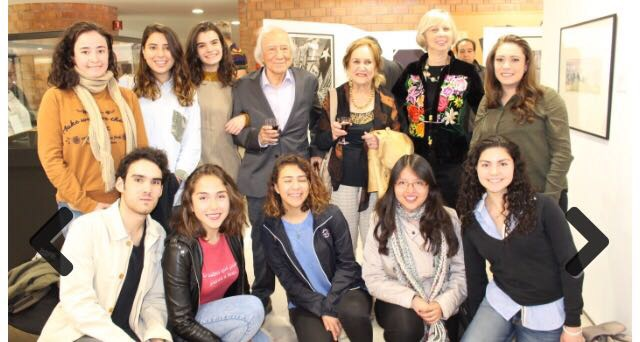
On the top row, from left to right: missing information, Valentina Kelly, Cecilia Castillo, Arturo García Bustos, Arturo's wife Rina Lazo, Dina Comisarenco Mirkin and Guadalupe Falcón. On the bottom row, from left to right: Juan Pablo Aguilar, Celeste Garduño, Daniela Barraza, Elsy Carabarin and Regina González. Celeste, Daniela, Cecilia and Valentina were the students in charge of mounting García's and Lazo's artworks around the exhibition room.

== Career ==
García Bustos career began as one of four students who went to Coyoacán to study under Frida Kahlo in the Coyoacán section of Mexico City. These students became known as Los Fridos. He worked as an apprentice in mural painting with Diego Rivera and initially learned engraving and lithography working at the Taller de Gráfica Popular with Leopoldo Méndez. In 1958, he collaborated with graphic designer Miguel Prieto at the Instituto Nacional de Bellas Artes.

He had individual and collective exhibitions in various parts of Mexico and abroad. Individual exhibits include those in Mexico City, Veracruz, Oaxaca, Chiapas, Michoacán and Guadalajara as well as in countries such as Guatemala, El Salvador, the United States, Venezuela, Ecuador, Argentina, Bolivia, Germany, the Soviet Union and North Korea. He participated in numerous collective exhibitions especially with the Taller de Gráfica Popular early in his career as well as biennials sponsored by the Instituto Nacional de Bellas Artes and the Salón de la Plástica Mexicana. In 2005, a collection consisting of eleven of his paintings was exhibited at the Museo Mural Diego Rivera of the Instituto Nacional de Bellas Artes, in Mexico City.

While he was better known for his graphic work, he also did a number of murals. In 1947 he assisted Frida Kahlo with a mural at the Josefa Ortiz de Domínguez House in Coyoacán. Other projects include a fresco the Hotel Posada del Sol in Mexico City (1948), a fresco depicting Zapata at the Escuela Rural de Temixco, Morelos (1950), a series of seven murals at the Sociedad Cooperativa Ejidal, with Rina Lazo and Atilio Carrasco (1952), a fresco called Pobledores de las Siete Regiones de Oaxaca at the Museo Nacional de Antropología (1964), A series of sixteen print murals to decorate the Venustiano Carranza House Museum in Cuatro Ciénegas, Coahuila (1969), A series of nine panels for the Casa de Obrero Mundial in Mexico City (1971), Oaxaca en la historia y en el mito at the state government building in the city of Oaxaca (1980), and a mural at the cultural center of Azcapotzalco, Mexico City.

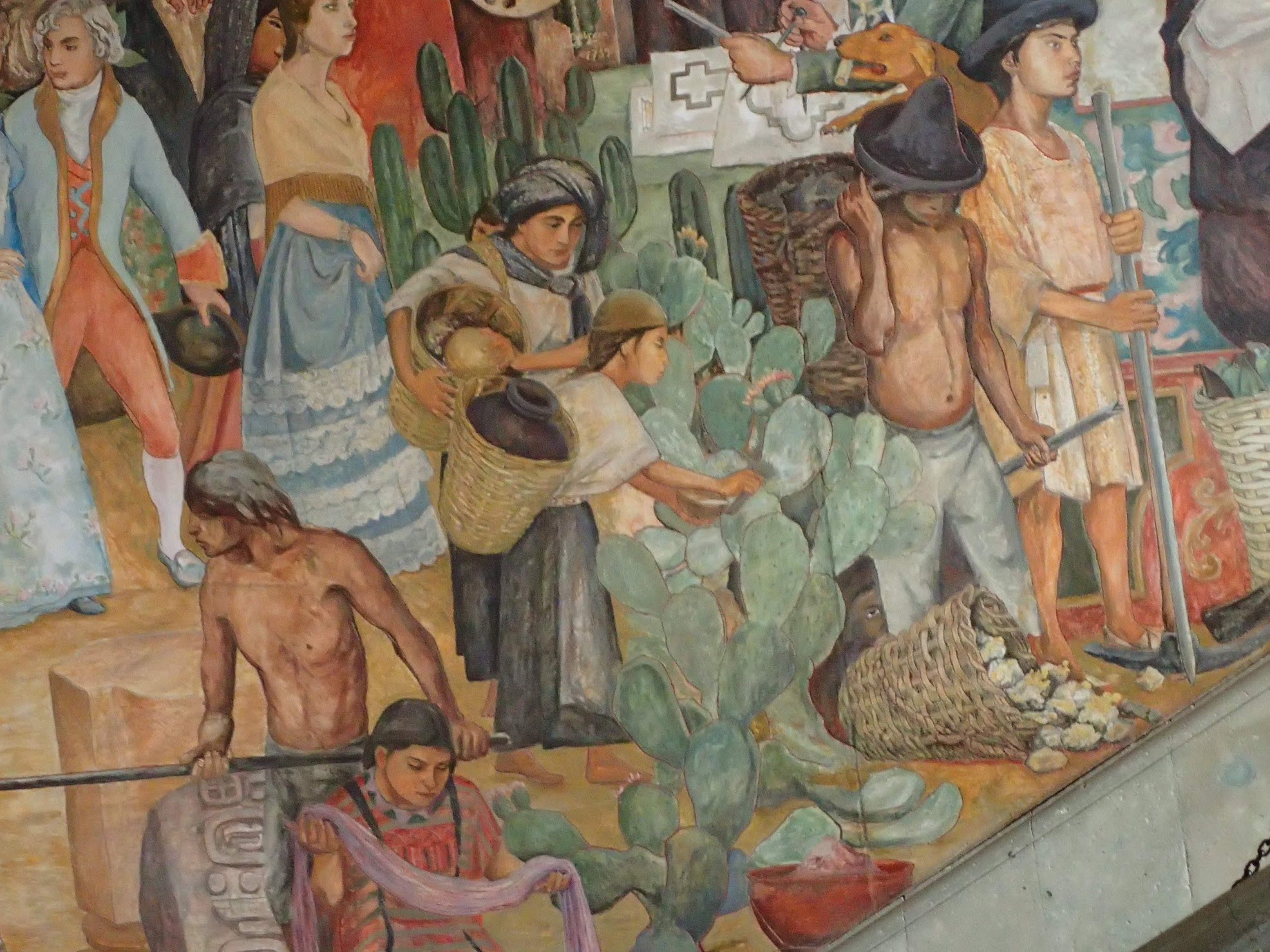
Steps in the cochineal harvest, detail from Oaxaca en la historia y en el mito

Most of his career was spent teaching and giving lectures, seminars and conferences. He taught engraving at the Escuela de Bellas Artes in Guatemala City and founded the Taller de Grabado at the Casa del Lago in Chapultepec. He taught fine arts at the Escuela de Bellas Artes of the Benito Juárez Autonomous University of Oaxaca, Escuela de Iniciación Artística Núm. 3 in Mexico City and drawing and painting workshops at the Casa del Lago in Chapultepec. He conducted conferences on the history of engraving and lithography in Mexico at the state universities of Oaxaca and Sinaloa, the Galería Municipal de Veracruz and in various venues in Mexico City. Abroad he conducted conference on Mexican muralism and engraving in Germany, Italy and Guatemala.

Recognitions include first prize at a UNAM event honoring the Niños Heroes (1947), second prize at a poster contest honoring Chopin (1949), Peace Movement Gold Medal in Guatemala (1953), first prize at an event sponsored by Grupo Saker-Ti in Guatemala (1954), first prize and gold medal at the V Festival de la Juventud in Poland (1955), first prize at the Salón Annual de Grabado at the Salón de la Plástica Mexicana (1957), silver medal at an engraving event in Moscow (1957), first prize from the Consejo Nacional de Turismo, Mexico City (1962).

He became a member of the Academia de Artes in 1973, the World Peace Council in 1974 and the Salón de la Plástica Mexicana in 1974.

== Artistry ==
García Bustos considered himself to be an "heir to the figurative strand of Mexican art." He recalled the impact that seeing Diego Rivera and José Clemente Orozco at work made on him in Mexico City, prompting him to have "visual shocks" and dream that he too was painting murals.
