= Colegio Humboldt =

Colegio Humboldt may refer to the following German international schools in Latin America:

- Colegio Humboldt, Caracas
- Asociación de Educación y Cultura “Alejandro von Humboldt” Colegio Alemán de Guatemala
- Colegio Alemán Humboldt Guayaquil
- Colegio Peruano Alemán Alexander von Humboldt (Lima)
- Colegio Alemán Alexander von Humboldt (Greater Mexico City)
- Colegio Humboldt Puebla
- Colegio Humboldt (Costa Rica) (San Jose)
- Colégio Humboldt São Paulo
