= Rina Lazo =

Guatemalan-Mexican artist (1923-2019)

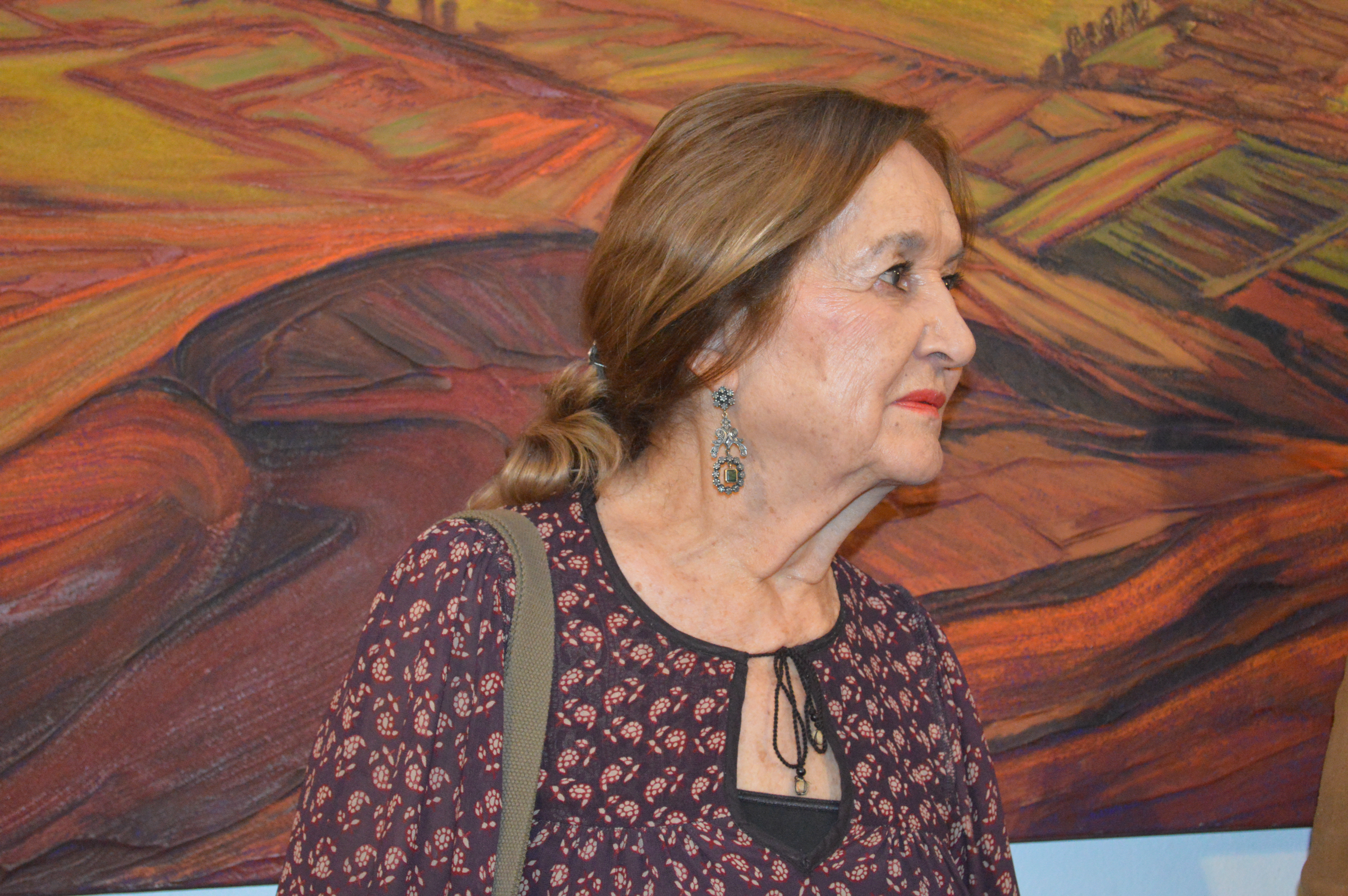
- At an opening at the Salón de la Plástica Mexicana in 2015
- Born: Rina Lazo Wasem; October 23, 1923; Guatemala City, Guatemala
- Died: November 1, 2019 (aged 96); Mexico City, Mexico
- Education: Academia Nacional de Bellas Artes
- Known for: Painting, murals
- Notable work: "Por los caminos de la libertad" (1944), "El agua, origen de la vida sobre la tierra" (1951), "Tierra fertile" (1954), "Venceremos" (1959)
- Movement: Mexican muralism
- Spouse: Arturo Garcia Bustos (1926–2017)
- Awards: Order of the Quetzal (2004)

Rina Lazo Wasem (October 23, 1923 – November 1, 2019) was a Guatemalan painter. She began her career in mural painting with Diego Rivera as his assistant. She worked with him from 1947 until his death in 1957 on projects both in Mexico and Guatemala. Thereafter, she remained an active painter, better known for her mural works than canvases, although the latter have been exhibited in Mexico and other countries. This has made her one of Guatemala's best-known artists. She was a member of the Mexican muralism movement and criticized modern artists as too commercial and not committed to social causes. She believed muralism would revive in Mexico because of its historical value.

== Life ==
Rina Lazo was born on October 23, 1923, in Guatemala City to Arturo Lazo and Melanea Wasern. She attended primary through high school at the Colegio Alemán. She spent her childhood in Cobán, where she had contact with local Mayan peoples, which would later have an impact on her art.

Lazo began her art studies at the Academia Nacional de Bellas Artes in Guatemala City in the early 1940s. (Today this school is called Escuela Nacional de Artes Plásticas "Rafael Rodríguez Padilla".) There she worked as an assistant to Julio Urruela painting murals at Guatemala's National Palace. In 1945, she won a scholarship from then President Arévalo to study art in Mexico, at the Escuela Nacional de Pintura, Escultura y Grabado "La Esmeralda". She stated this is why she left the country, not the revolution that was taking place at the time. At the school, she studied with Carlos Orozco Romero, Jesús Guerrero Galván, Alfredo Zalce, Federico Cantú and Manuel Rodríguez Lozano but quickly became a favorite student of Diego Rivera, who she called her best teacher. She met Frida Kahlo at her and Rivera's home in Coyoacán, where she was invited to eat. She did not like spicy food, but Rivera told her she needed to learn how to appreciate chili peppers to appreciate Mexico.

Interview (in Spanish)

Lazo married Mexican artist Arturo Garcia Bustos in 1949. Their home was said to be a residence of La Malinche, and was later a monastery, prison, and hospital. In 2006, after living there for more than forty years, they opened part of the ground floor to house the Galería de la Casa Colorada. This gallery is run by their daughter, Rina García Lazo who is an architect. Lazo said that the house and the surrounding neighborhood inspired both of them for its history and the legends associated with it.

Her early artistic, social and political life was strongly tied with that of Rivera and Kahlo, and she became a militant supporter of the Mexican Communist Party.

== Career ==
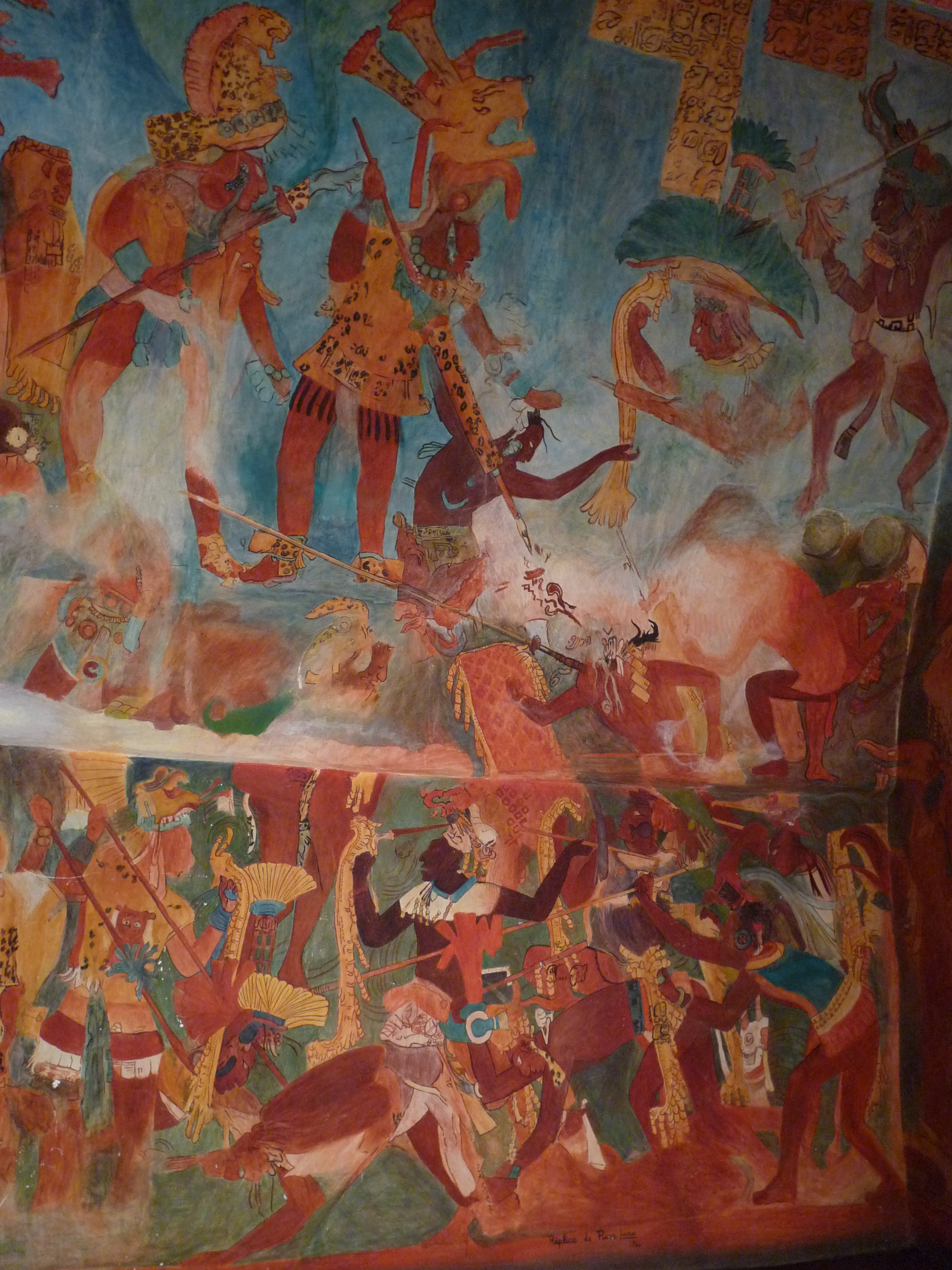
Section of the reproduction of the Bonampak murals

Lazo's art career began soon after she arrived to La Esmeralda, when Diego Rivera hired her as an assistant. Her first collaboration with him was in 1947, on the mural called Sueño de una tarde dominical en la Alameda Central for the Hotel del Prado. Rivera called her his “right hand” and “the best of his students.”

From then until his death in 1957, she worked with him on a number of murals, which led her career to be mostly in mural painting. These projects included murals done at the Cáracamo del Río Lerma in Chapultepec titled El agua, origen de la vida sobre la tierra (1951), the natural stone mural at the Olympic Stadium at Ciudad Universitaria (1952), two at the Hospital La Raza, El pueblo en demanda de salud and Historia de la medicine en México (1953), and one in Guatemala, La gloriosa victoria (1954) at the Palacio Nacional de Cultura. The last one depicts the coup which ousted Guatemalan president Jacobo Árbenz, in which blame is cast on the United States. Lazo herself appears in this mural as a young guerilla fighter in a bright red blouse.

In addition to working with Rivera, Lazo executed a number of her own mural projects over the course of her career. She produced frescos, murals in vinyl and stucco in Guatemala City and various locations in Mexico. Before she married, she created a mural at the Escuela Rural de Temixco with the aim of getting the Communist Party recognized in the state of Morelos. Her next mural was Tierra fertile (1954), based on scenes from the Tikal area at the Museo de la Universidad de San Carlos in Guatemala. Another mural she created in Guatemala is Venceremos (1959), which later the Guatemalan government would honor along with other murals.

In 1966, she created two reproductions of the pre-Columbian murals at Bonampak. The first and larger was done at the Museo Nacional de Antropología in Mexico City in a reproduced Mayan structure created for the work. She was selected for this job due to her experience in working in frescos with Rivera. This work led to the request for a second reproduction, this one on movable panels for a television company. In 1995, she created another mural for the Museo de Antropologia called Venerable abuelo maiz.

Although she and her husband, García Bustos, were both students of Kahlo and Rivera, they had not worked together over their careers because of their different areas of interest. However, in 1997, she worked with her husband to design and paint a 2.7 by 7 meter portable mural called Realidad y sueno en el mundo maya. Mágico encuentro entre hombres y dioses, which was inaugurated at the Hotel Casa Turquesa in Cancún.

Lazo's works on canvas are less known but her first prize-winning piece is titled Por los caminos de la libertad (1944). Her work has been exhibited in Germany, Austria, France, the United States, Mexico, Guatemala, South Korea and other countries.

== Teaching ==
She worked as a teacher of the fine arts in several institutions such as the Escuela de Restauración of the Instituto Nacional de Bellas Arts, the Secretarial of Public Education and the Escuela de Bellas Artes in Oaxaca. She also gave classes at the Casa del Lago in Chapultepec. She also gave seminars and workshops on at the Museo Nacional de Antropología in Mexico City, the Galerías de la Ciudad de México, the Casa de Cultura in Oaxaca, as well in the cities of Guatemala, Leipzig and Pyong Yang.

== Legacy ==
Abel Santiago wrote her biography, Sabiduría de Manos, published in 2007, which also includes texts from Andrés Henestrosa, Henrique González Casanova, María Luisa Mendoza, Otto-Raúl González and Carmen de la Fuente. She had a number of homages in places such as the Museo Mural Diego Rivera. The Mexican embassy in Guatemala paid tribute to her with an exhibition of panels of her work depicting the murals of Bonampak at the Centro Cultural Luis Cardoza y Aragón in 2010. She and her husband were invited to the United States to recount their time with Rivera in 2011.

International exposure to her work has made Lazo one of the most well-known Guatemalan artists.

== Honors, awards, distinctions ==
- Lazo was a member of Mexico's Salón de la Plástica Mexicana honor society from 1964 on.
- She was recognized for both her work with Rivera as well as her own independent projects.
- She received the Emeretisimum prize from the Faculty of Humanities of Universidad de San Carlos de Guatemala.
- In 2004, she received the Order of the Quetzal from the Guatemalan government for her life's work.
- In 2005, she received the Medal of Peace from Mexico.
- In 2010 she received a recognition from Romania, and led the protocol of the “changing of the Rose of Peace” at the Palacio Nacional de la Cultura, which celebrates the signing of peace accords realized in 1996.

== Art ==
As a disciple of Rivera and Kahlo, Lazo was part of the Mexican School of Painting or Mexican muralism movement. Working with the muralists, she learned that artists should not be isolated from society, but rather “be in the streets” and observe what is happening. One other influence upon her was that of her favorite writer, Miguel Ángel Asturias, who she met as a child, and again in Mexico much later. Asturias has written about her work as well

She preferred fresco painting, but her canvas works are noted for their interpretative quality, such as "El espejo de mi studio" from 2001, which features herself reflected in a mirror which is surrounded by children.

Lazo felt that art and artists were too commercialized and no longer committed to social causes. Although mural painting does not enjoy the popularity today as it once did, Lazo still felt that Mexican muralism was important and relevant. She pointed out that major protagonists with the movement, such as Frida Kahlo and Diego Rivera, still had international name recognition and exhibits of their work. Lazo believed muralism will make a comeback because of Mexico's long history with this art form and its association with reflection upon social and political issues.

== Personal life ==
Lazo met her future husband, Arturo García Bustos, through her association with Rivera and Kahlo. He was one of “Los Fridos,” students of Frida Kahlo. They married in 1949 when Lazo was 25. The couple lived in the Coyoacán borough of Mexico City. Their house is a colonial structure called Casa Colorada, on Calle de Vallarta in the La Conchita neighborhood of Coyoacán. Their only daughter, Rina García Lazo, is an architect specializing in the restoration of monuments.

Lazo continued living in Mexico until her death although she maintained family ties in Guatemala. Lazo died on November 1, 2019, at the age of 96.
