= Juan Cordero =

Mexican painter and muralist

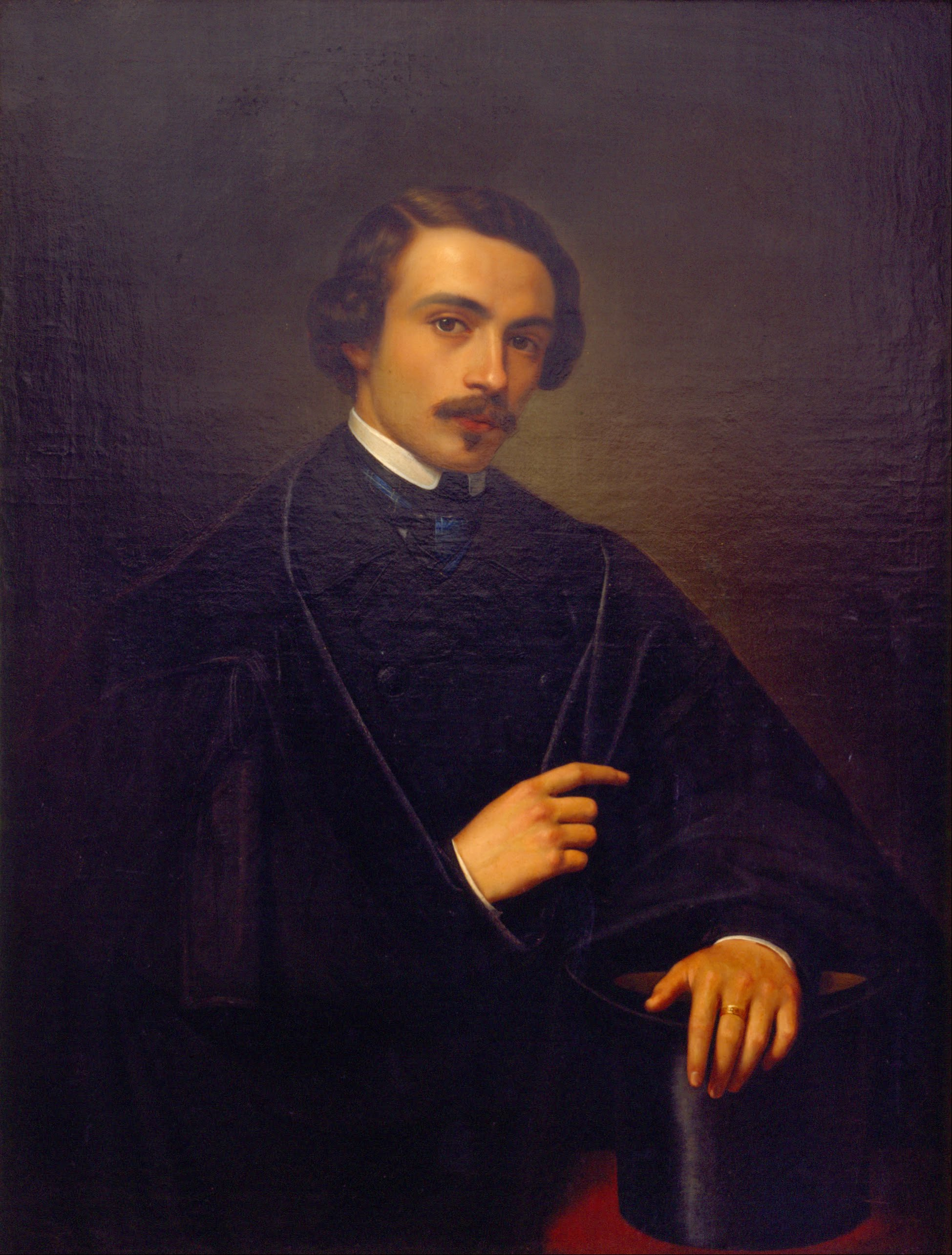
Self-portrait (1847)

Juan Nepomuceno María Bernabé del Corazón de Jesús Cordero de Hoyos (16 May 1822, Teziutlán - 29 May 1884, Coyoacán) was a Mexican painter and muralist in the Classical style, who began his career in Rome and Florence, Italy.

== Biography ==
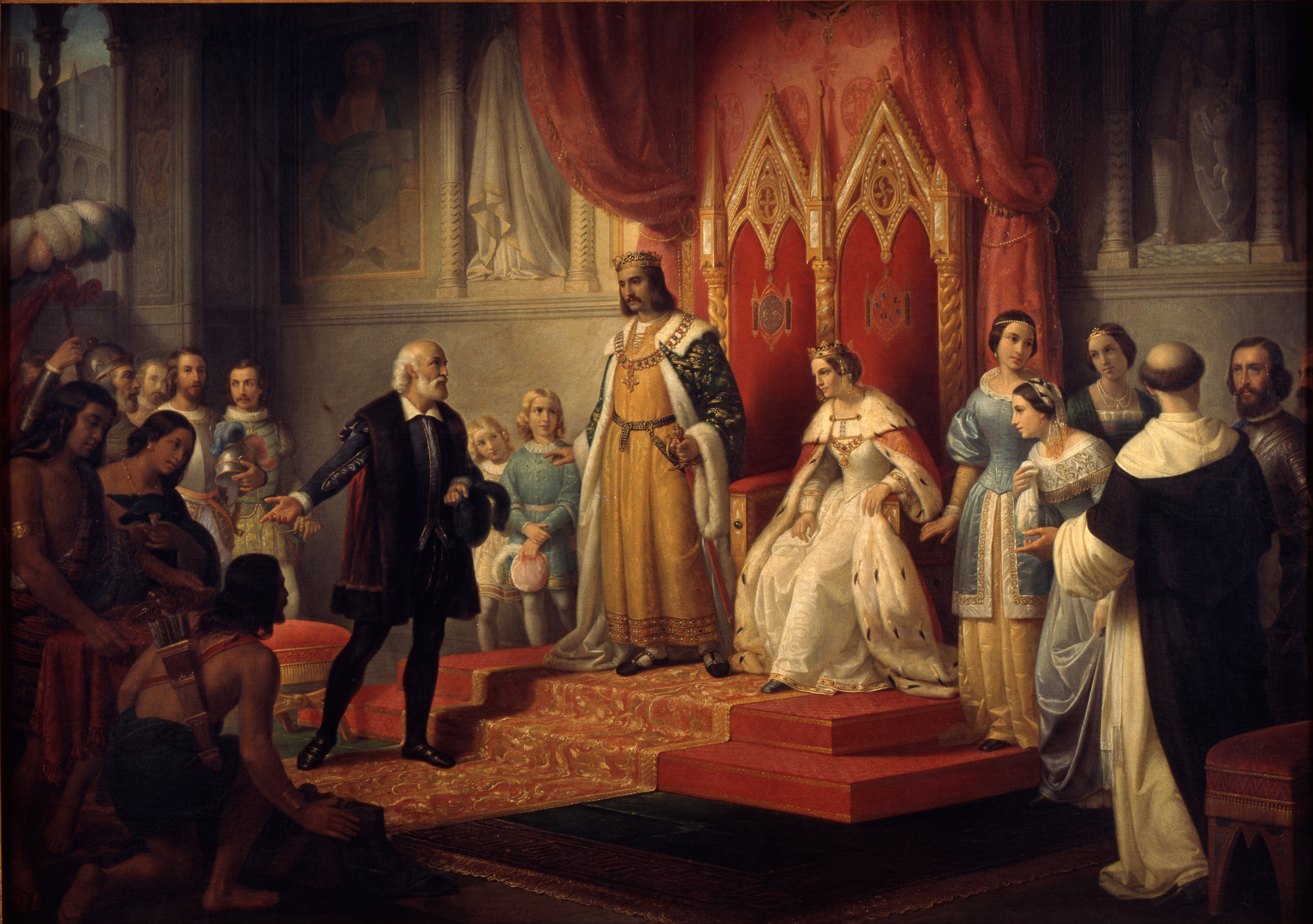
Columbus at the Court of the Catholic Monarchs (painted in Italy, 1850/1)

Juan Cordero was baptized on June 11, 1822, in Sagrario Teziutlán, Puebla, Mexican Empire. He is buried at Panteón del Tepeyac in the Federal District of México City, Mexico. His father was Tomás Antonio Cordero (1789-1859) and his mother was María Dolores Hoyos Mier. Juan Cordero had one sister and three brothers, he was the middle child, listed in birth order: María de la Asunción Cordero Hoyos, Manuel Cordero Hoyos, Juan Cordero de Hoyos, José María Cordero Hoyos, Francisco Cordero Hoyos. In 1839 Cordero married María del Los Ángeles osio Arias Caballero. Together they had four daughters and two sons, listed in birth order: María Dolores Cordero, Antonio Cordero, María del Carmen Cordero, Tomás Cordero, María Teresa Ramona Luisa de la Santísma Trinidad Cordero.

== Career ==
Cordero's parents originally expected him to join the family business, but eventually recognized his talent and enrolled him at the Academia de San Carlos. By 1844, he had become so accomplished that his father gathered together as much money as he could (apparently even selling the family piano) and sent him to study in Rome at the Accademia di San Luca. Both schools have a number of his paintings still today.

His primary instructor in Rome was the Spanish painter, Pelegrí Clavé, but he was also influenced by the Nazarene movement and Filippo Agricola. Later, his works were noticed by former Mexican President Anastasio Bustamante, who was living in exile. Bustamante arranged for Cordero to be given a position with Mexico's legation at the Holy See, which allowed him to stay in Rome until 1853.

He returned home with several large canvases that he exhibited at the academy, to great success. This created a rivalry with his former teacher, Clavé, who had moved to Mexico and was now the academy's Director. Soon, the rivalry took on political overtones, as Cordero was a Liberal, while Clavé was a Conservative. Cordero made an effort to supplant Clavé as Director, with the support of General Santa Anna, whose equestrian portrait he had recently painted, but the academy's board chose to retain Clavé.

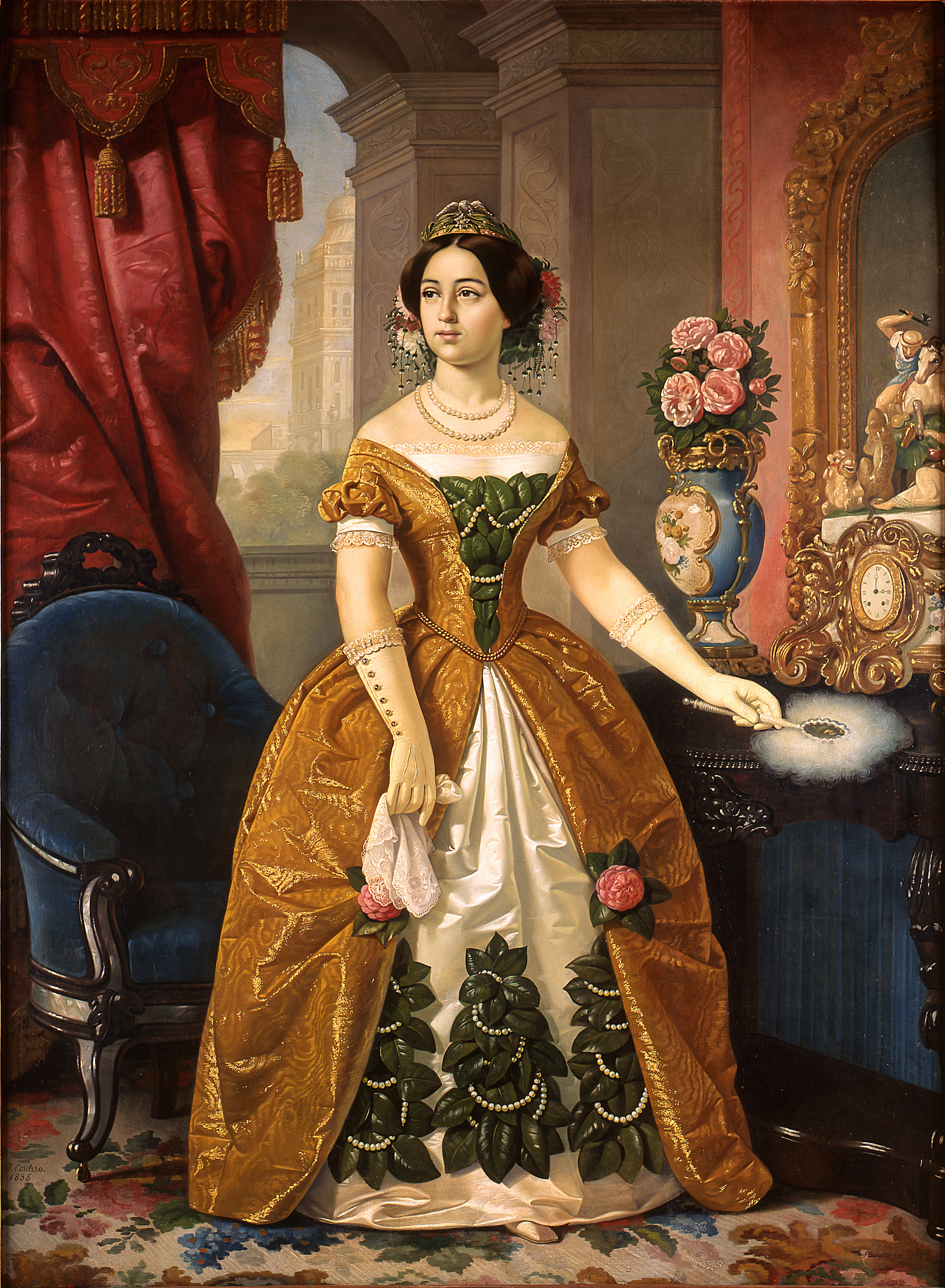
Portrait of General Antonio López de Santa Anna's wife, Doña Dolores Tosta de Santa Anna. (1855)

Between 1860 and 1867, he travelled throughout Mexico, painting portraits. He then turned to painting murals, including the cupola at the Church of Santa Teresa la Antigua, which had been destroyed by an earthquake in 1845 and rebuilt by the Spanish architect Lorenzo de la Hidalga.

He was also a friend of Gabino Barreda who, in 1874, asked him to paint a mural at the National Preparatory School, which would later become the home of the Mexican muralism movement. It was called "The Triumph of Science and Industry Over Ignorance and Sloth", and was the first Mexican mural on a secular philosophical theme. In 1900, it was destroyed by the school's Director, and replaced by a stained-glass window. Before its destruction, the work was apparently copied by Juan de Mata Pacheco, but it is not certain that his painting of the same name is an accurate reproduction.

After 1875, Cordero stopped exhibiting. This may have been a reaction to the political situation created by Porfirio Díaz' coup in 1876. A major retrospective exhibition was held at the Palacio de Bellas Artes in 1945. While there are not any formally listed exhibitions, his works are in museums across Europe and Mexico.

== Early Mexican Muralism ==
19th century mural painting in Mexico started as a response to Spanish colonialism. Artists started melding art and politics as a way to reclaim their cultural identity apart from their colonizers to continue the tradition of mural painting in the Catholic church. These murals started out as small works and evolved into larger mural paintings on various buildings of social and political significance. This idea of creating paintings and other works of art to show nationalistic pride was seen during the time in which Cordero was at his height in the art world. These early murals were used to depict and endorse a positive picture of the postcolonial Mexico. It also dominated education and political thought for many artists, an example of this is Juan Cordero's “Triumph of Science and Labor Over Envy and Ignorance” (1874, Mexico City, Escuela N.P). This painting takes the idea of how Mexico has developed with new science and technology, the painting also suggests that the government capitalizes on these advancements while neglecting the treatment of their citizens. This usage of murals to express political ideas later inspired other famous Mexican muralists of the 1920 such as Diego Rivera, José Orozco and David Siqueiros. This inspiration can be seen through the muralism project through Mexico.

== Artworks ==
Columbus in the Court of the Catholic Monarchs:

Cordero’s painting Columbus in the Court of the Catholic Monarchs was exhibited in the Academia de San Carlos in 1851. The painting depicts an imagined historical event when Columbus returned from exploring the Americas and met with the King and Queen of Spain, Fernando, and Isabella. It shows Columbus presenting Native Americans and natural specimens from the Americas to the monarchs. The painting brings together the old world and the new world in order to reinforce the historical and cultural connection between Mexico and Europe. Cordero first painted this as an appeal to President Antonio Lopez de Santa Anna so that he could be the director of the Academia de San Carlos. Even though Cordero did not ultimately get the role of academy director, the painting initiated a change in the art world, as more Mexican artists began to paint secular and national events that would later be seen as a form of a historical document. The academy exhibition itself sparked one of the first public debates over secular history paintings, due in part to the propaganda of the postcolonial government. The painting was significant because of the usage of the style in historical paintings, as such this allowed Cordero to use it as a vehicle that perpetuates the postcolonial legislation of racism and classism in Mexico during the late eighteenth and early nineteenth centuries. Cordero's painting would later be seen as an aid to the construction of Mexico's national identity. While many historical paintings were praised for the innovation that led to civil discourse, it also allowed the bourgeoise elites and the monarchs to promote a social hierarchy within Mexico with the express goal of wanting to assimilate the indigenous population into the political structure.

1. Santa Teresa, oil on canvas 1845

2. Portrait as Indian slave, oil on canvas 1850

3. Renovation of magnificent crucifix, oil on canvas 1852

4. God surrounded by cardinal and theological virtues and evangelists, oil on canvas 1855

5. Señora Dolores Tosta de Santa Anna, oil on canvas 1855

6. Jesus among the doctors, oil on canvas 1845, repaired in 1855

7. San Jose y el nino, oil on canvas, 1858

8. Cabeza de San Juan Bautista, oil on canvas 1875
