= Antonio Curò =

Italian engineer, mountaineer and entomologist

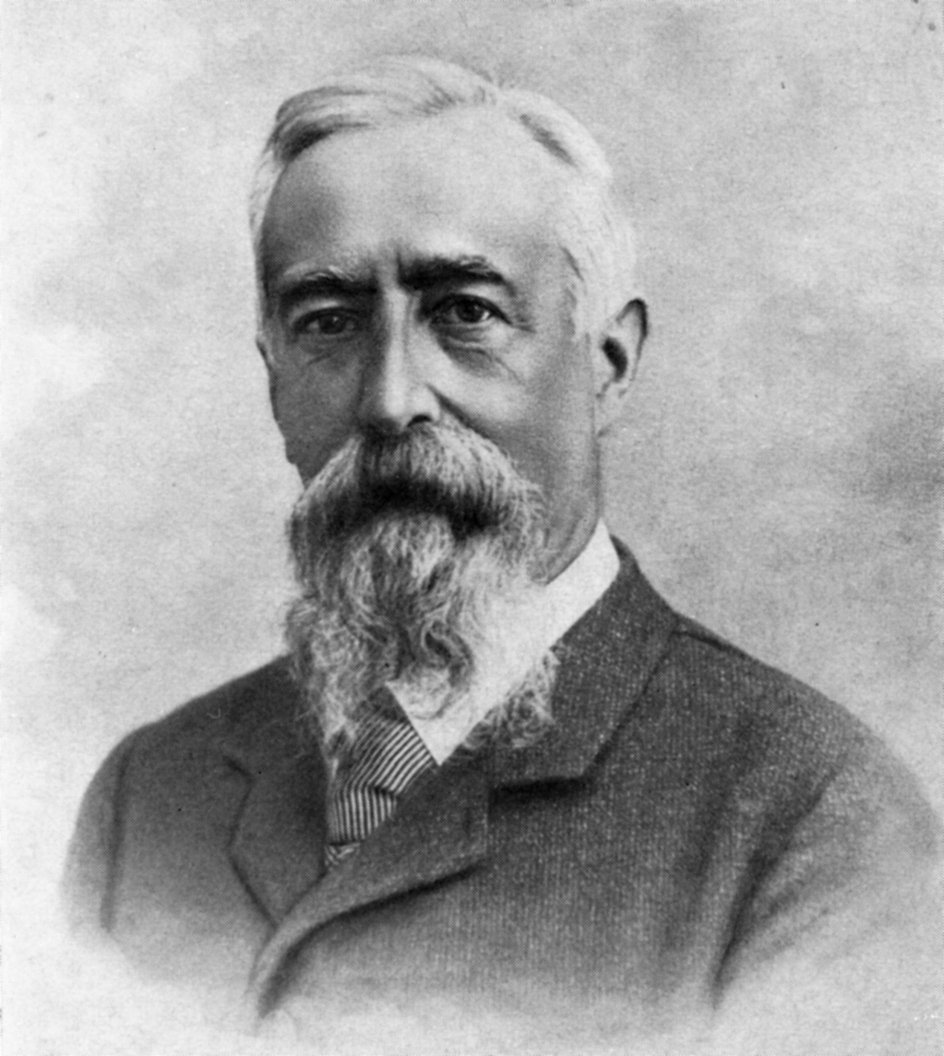
Antonio Curò

Antonio Curò (born 21 June 1828 in Bergamo, died 10 May 1906) was an Italian engineer, mountaineer and entomologist.

He was a lepidopterist and published Saggio di un Catalogo dei Lepidotteri d’Italia between 1875 and 1889.

He was a founder and president of the Bergamo section of the Italian Alpine Club.

His collection is conserved in the Museo di Scienze Naturali Enrico Caffi.

== Selected works ==
- Saggio di un catalogo dei lepidotteri d'Italia [Essay on a catalogue of Italian Lepidoptera]. Florence. 1885. doi:10.3931/e-rara-72787.
