= Santa Teresa la Antigua =

Coordinates: 19°26′1.88″N 99°7′50.56″W

- Santa Teresa la Antigua
- Country: Mexico
- Denomination: Roman Catholic

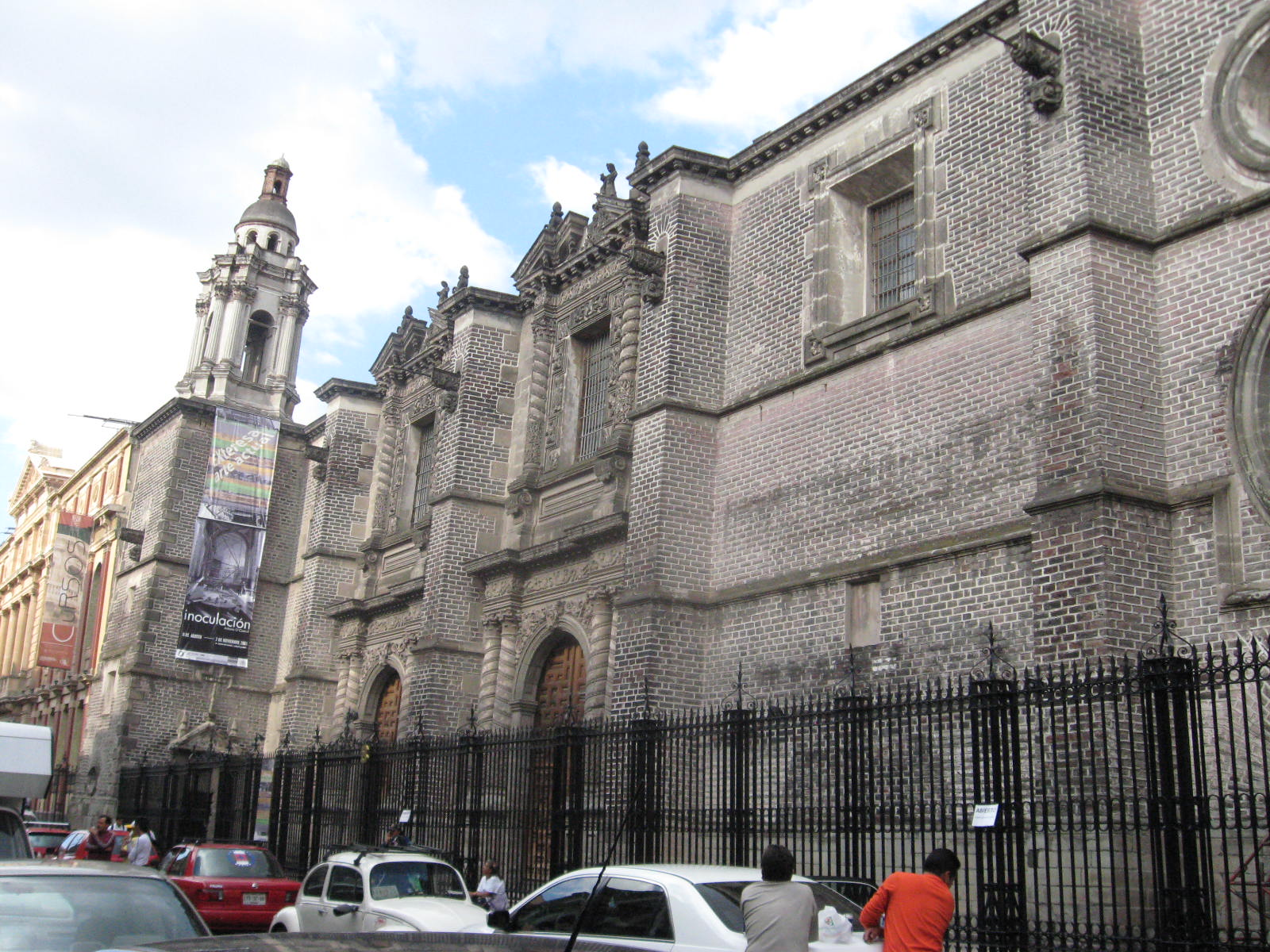
The Santa Teresa la Antigua building

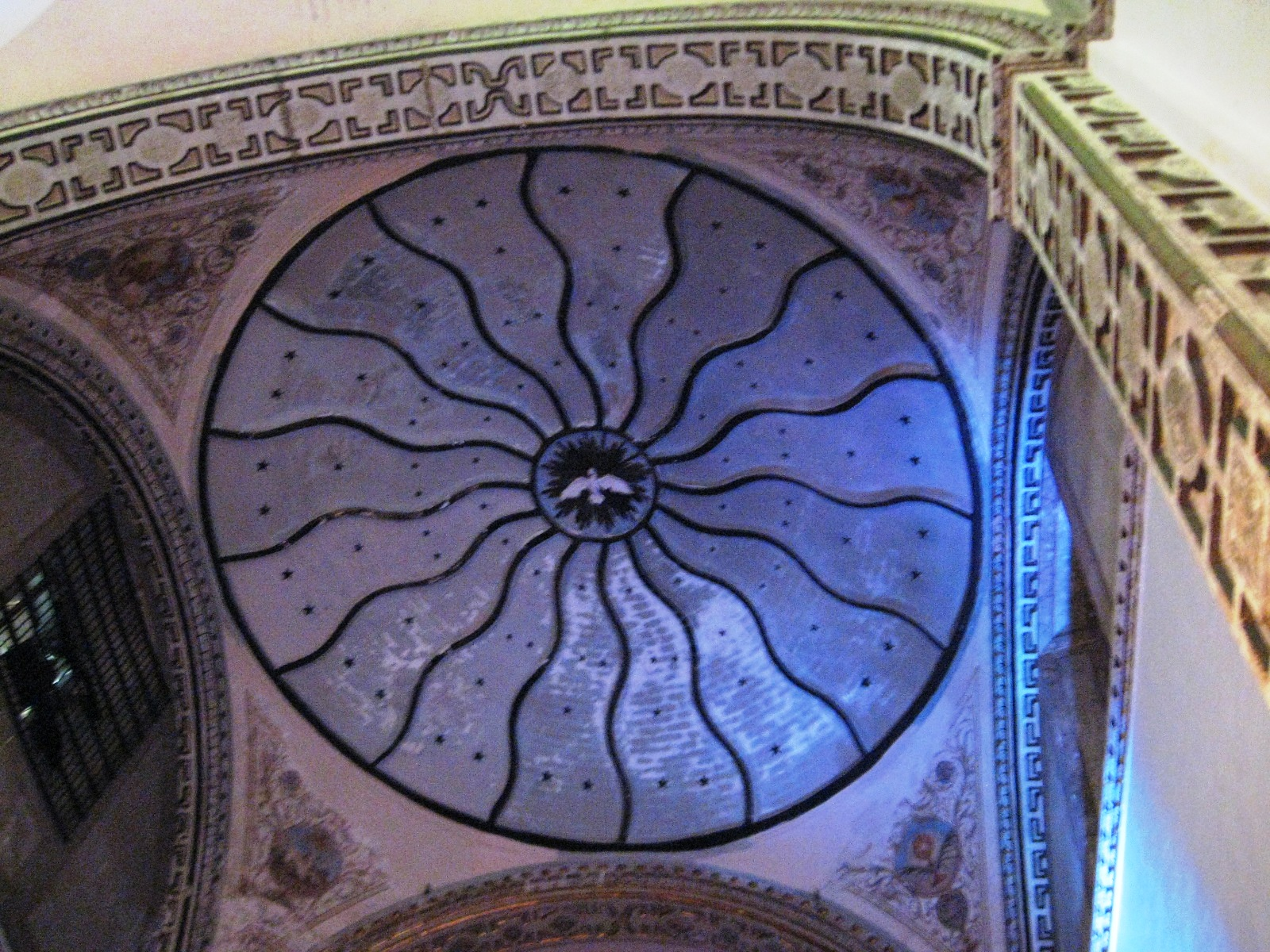
Cupola of the convent area

Santa Teresa la Antigua is a former convent located in the historic center of Mexico City on Licenciado Primo de Verdad #6 just northeast of the city's main plaza. The complex ceased to be a convent in the latter part of the 19th century and has housed the Santa Teresa la Antigua Alternative Art Center since 1989.

== History of the convent ==
The impetus behind the establishment of the convent occurred in 1613 when the ship carrying the archbishop Juan Pérez de la Serna ran into a storm that threatened to destroy it. The archbishop promised Saint Teresa of Ávila to establish a Carmelite monastery if she would allow him to reach New Spain safely. Once securely on land, he convinced sisters Inés Castillet and Mariana de la Encarnación, heiresses of the plantations of Juan Luis de Riveral, to finance the project. The convent also had a number of other wealthy contributors, such as the Marquise of Guadalcazar.

Much of the convent was built in eight months, and the order was established in 1616; it was first known as the San José de las Carmelitas Descalzas convent. However, popularly the complex became known as “Santa Teresa la Antigua.”

Much of the facility was built to allow public access, except for certain areas reserved for the nuns. The order was an austere one, as it followed the Spanish Discalced Carmelites tradition of the writer and nun Teresa Zepeda y Ahumada. Unlike many other convents of the time, it had no servants or other help other than girls aspiring to be admitted into the order.

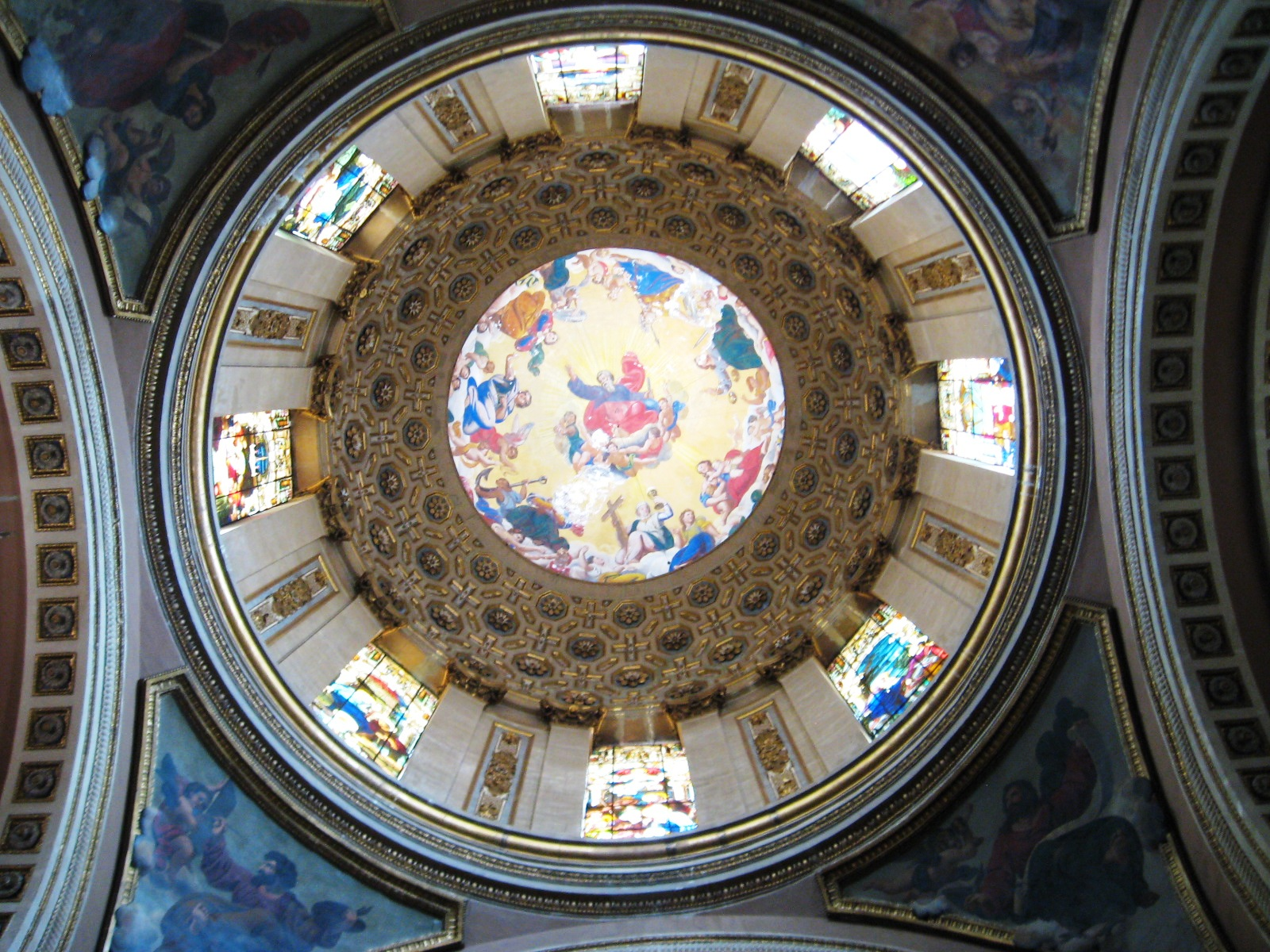
Cupola of the chapel

The convent's church was rebuilt in 1684 by Captain Esteban de Molina and was renamed officially as “Nuestra Señora de la Antigua.” Much of the complex was rebuilt by Antonio Gonzalez Velazquez and the chapel of Señor de Santa Teresa was dedicated in 1813. Paintings by the Spanish artist Rafael Ximeno y Planes were added at this time. An earthquake demolished the dome and the apse, taking with them the paintings done by Ximeno. Reconstruction, replacing the older dome with a double-vaulted one, took thirteen years. New paintings were done by Juan Cordero.

Sor Juana Inés de la Cruz once lived here, but due to her fragile health and the austere conditions of the order, she soon moved to another convent nearby in the city. The convent also served as a prison for Josefa Ortiz de Dominguez, one of the earliest conspirators for Mexican Independence.

In 1863, the convent was closed and the complex was converted to secular use. It served as a military barracks, a school for teachers, as the home of the National University, the print shop of the government news agency and the archive of the Secretary of Finance. In 1989, the convent was rededicated as the Ex-Santa Teresa Alternative Art Center, specializing in performance art as well as static pieces. A non-profit organization dedicated to collecting alternative art was founded in 1993 here.

== Building's notable features ==
The facade inclines noticeably backwards, which is due to the uneven sinking of the building into the soft soil underneath Mexico City, and is divided by buttresses.

The convent has two identical Baroque portals. Both the first and second stories appear to be adorned with Solomonic columns, but the columns on the second floor are really smooth helixes. The window frame facing the street is profusely decorated and includes anagrams of the names of the Virgin Mary, Saint Joseph and Saint Joachim.

The exterior contains sixteen Corinthian columns and there is a dome with stained-glass windows.

=== Murals ===
After the building was repaired from an 1845 earthquake, its wall murals were repainted by Juan Cordero. The walls contain paintings named "The Christ of Saint Theresa," and "Saint Matthew."

The cupola dome interior's mural, above the stained-glass windows, was painted by Juan Cordero with an image of "God, the Father" surrounded by images representing virtues.

== See also ==
- List of colonial churches in Mexico City
