= Colegio Alemán de Guatemala =

School in Guatemala City

Coordinates: 14.6080°N 90.5596°W

- German: Deutsche Schule Guatemala

Information
- Established: 1 January 1901; 125 years ago
- Website: dsguatemala.edu.gt

Colegio Alemán de Guatemala (German: Deutsche Schule Guatemala) is a German international school in Zone 11, Guatemala City. It serves levels kindergarten through bachillerato (senior high school).

It is categorized as a German school abroad by the Zentralstelle für das Auslandsschulwesen. It is one of more than 140 German schools abroad and has the status of an encounter school with a bicultural school goal, i.e. it leads to the German Abitur as well as the national Bachillerato.

== History ==
The school was founded on 1 January 1901 by the Asociación de Educación y Cultura "Alejandro von Humboldt".

At the celebration of its 100th anniversary in 2001, the German School Guatemala was awarded the "Orden del Quetzal en grado de Gran Cruz" by the Guatemalan government for its outstanding educational work.
