= List of Mexican engineers =

This list of Mexican engineers is a list of notable people who have been trained in or have practised engineering.

- Bernardo Quintana Arrioja
- León Ávalos y Vez
- Juan Francisco Azcárate
- Alexander Balankin
- Mariano de la Bárcena
- Francisco Barnés de Castro
- Luis Enrique Bracamontes
- Alberto Bustani Adem
- Cuauhtémoc Cárdenas
- Heberto Castillo
- Eduardo Chávez (politician)
- Francisco Escárcega
- Jorge Galvan
- Jesús García
- Genaro García Luna
- Fernando García Roel
- José Antonio Garrido Nataren
- Guillermo González Camarena
- Jorge Gutiérrez Vera
- José María Lanz
- José Luis Luege Tamargo
- Pablo Emilio Madero
- Daniel Mastretta
- Baltasar Mena Iniesta
- Joaquín de Mendizábal y Tamborrel
- Concepción Mendizábal Mendoza
- Luis E. Miramontes
- Antonio Nieto
- Rodolfo Neri Vela
- Miguel Ángel de Quevedo
- Jorge Matute Remus
- Antonio Rivas Mercado
- Alfonso Romo
- Emilio Rosenblueth
- Gerardo Ruiz Mateos
- Javier Barros Sierra
- Estanislao Tovilla Cortázar
- Rodolfo Félix Valdés
- California Odha Zertuche Díaz
- Heinrich Zoelly
