= Cortázar (disambiguation) =

Julio Cortázar (1914–1984), was an Argentine author.

Cortázar or Cortazar may also refer to:

== People ==
- David Fernández Cortázar (born 1985), Spanish footballer
- Eider Merino Cortazar (born 1994), Spanish racing cyclist
- Ernesto Cortázar II, (1940–2004), Mexican composer
- Estanislao Tovilla Cortázar (1936–1994), Mexican civil engineer
- Esteban Cortázar (born 1984), Colombian fashion designer
- Fernando García de Cortázar (1942–2022), Spanish priest
- Julián de Cortázar (1576–1630), Spanish prelate
- Luis de Cortázar (fl. 1837–1839), governor of the Mexican state of Guanajuato
- Maximiliano Cortázar (born 1966), Mexican politician
- Modesto Cortázar y Leal de Ibarra (1783–1862), Spanish Prime Minister
- Octavio Cortázar (1935–2008), Cuban film director and screenwriter
- Ovidio Cortázar Ramos (born 1962), Mexican politician
- Roberto Cortázar (born 1962), Mexican painter
- René Cortázar (born 1952), Chilean economist

== Places ==
- Cortazar, Guanajuato, Mexico
