= Edward Chávez =

Edward Chávez may refer to:

- Edward Chávez (artist) (1917–1995), American artist
- Edward L. Chávez (born 1956), New Mexico Supreme Court judge
- Edward Chavez (politician), California politician, mayor of Stockton
- Ed Chavez, California politician formerly representing California's 57th State Assembly district

== See also ==
- Eduardo Chávez (disambiguation)
