= José Garrido =

José Garrido may refer to:

- José Garrido (footballer) (1960–2024), Portuguese football player and manager
- José Antonio Garrido (born 1975), Spanish road bicycle racer
- José Antonio Garrido Nataren (born 1952), Mexican engineer
- José Garrido, (1914-2008), mayor of Havana, Westmar University Spanish professor
