= Roberto Cortázar =

Mexican painter (born 1962)

Maestro Roberto Cortázar
- Born: Mexico City, Mexico
- Education: INBAL’s School of Artistic Initiation No. 2 and the National School of Painting, Sculpture and Printmaking “La Esmeralda”.
- Known for: Drawing, painting, graphic arts, photography, sculpture, and digital art.
- Movement: Visual arts

Roberto Cortázar, born in the 1960s between Mexico City and Tapachula, Chiapas, is a Mexican contemporary artist.

== Academic training and activities ==
Roberto Cortázar began his training in 1976 at the National School of Arts, and continued his studies at the National School of Painting, Sculpture and Printmaking, also known as "La Esmeralda", with a grant from the National Institute of Fine Arts (INBAL) in Mexico.

He later collaborated with various academic institutions, delivering lectures, seminars, and consultations on the historical, philosophical, and theoretical aspects of art. In addition to these activities, he contributed to the revision of the academic curriculum at the Mexican National School of Fine Arts. Furthermore, from 1989 to 1993, he served as a founding member of the Consultative Council for the Mexican National Foundation for Culture and the Arts (CONACULTA). During these years, he also served as a juror for the National Plan for Creators and the National Fund for Plastic Arts.

== Museum projects ==
In 2006–2008, Cortázar presented Saturn and the Parricides at the Museo Amparo, a project that explores the philosophical and moral implications of tyrannicide and parricide. The project included artworks inspired by Greek mythology and Francisco Goya's painting Saturn Devouring his Son. This exhibition toured museums across Mexico, including the Museum of Contemporary Art (MARCO); the museum describes the project as follows:

In the course of his art history studies, Cortázar came upon Francisco Goya's Saturn, which addresses the myth of the god who devoured all of his children to prevent them from overthrowing him. He later found a variation on the theme in the tyrannoktoni, or Tyrannicides, the Athenian group of statues depicting a historical event: the murder of the tyrant Hipparchus by Aristogeiton and Harmodius. Musing over these works, he concluded that the history of art is far removed from the history of man, who writes the latter as a retelling of the battle to gain ascendancy over another, whereas art calls into question this exercise of power and plumbs the truth of human ideology". According to the curator: "In Cortázar's view, his characters' inner struggle is, likewise, the struggle that man must brave to achieve evolution, to cast off the primitive thirst for power that compelled Saturn to devour his children and drove Athenians to do away with Hipparcus.

In 2009, Cortázar was invited by the Mexican National Museum of Art to exhibit as part of their program to revisit the museum's collection with his reinterpretation of one of Mexico's noted masters, José Clemente Orozco. Cortazar has also exhibited this work at the Museo Dolores Olmedo in Mexico City in 2011.

== A critic's view ==
Art critic Edward M. Gomez, who has written for the New York Times, ARTnews, Art in America, Art & Antiques, Art + Auction, and the Japan Times, has published several articles and a monograph on Cortázar's work. In 1999, Gomez wrote how Cortazar's work relates to the artist's view of a "sprawling metropolis" as a "restless organism in constant motion." In 2009, Reinventing the Master: Cortazar's Variations on Orozco's Themes, Gomez wrote;

Cortázar, whose art is rooted in Mexico's long, rich tradition of figurative image-making (a tradition that stretches back to the region’s ancient civilisations), has never been primarily motivated by any theory or aesthetic doctrine. Instead, the art making language he has developed, with its unique blend of figurative and abstract elements, has evolved out of his technical experiments as a painter and draftsman, and out of his investigation and assimilation of a variety of influences, from the economical, expressive lines of such modern masters as Picasso and Matisse to the figure altering techniques of the Irish-born, British painter Francis Bacon. Like Bacon, who once remarked that "flesh is the reason oil painting was invented," Cortázar approaches and handles his materials in a way that is both elegant and visceral.

== Art fairs ==
Roberto Cortázar has exhibited at art fairs across the United States, Latin America, and Europe. He has exhibited his works at Art Miami with Praxis Gallery annually from 1994 to 2006. Cortázar is mentioned by Laura Meyers as one of the artists who has opened up Mexican contemporary art to the international art scene. In 2006, Cortázar withdrew from the commercial art market to focus on producing two academic projects in collaboration with museums in Mexico.

== Collections ==
Roberto Cortázar's works in public and private collections include the National Heritage "La Colección". Eugenio Lopez Alonso bought a Cortázar as his first painting in 1990 and has since built Colección Jumex, one of the largest and most prominent collections in the world.

== Publications ==
- Los Desmembrados Según Orozco (Dismemberment according to Orozco). National Museum of Art. National Institute of Fine Arts Publishing, 2009.
- "Saturn in the World of the Parricides". Mexico. Landucci, Editores, 2005.
- Roberto Cortazar: 344 Figures and One in One Space. Gómez, Edward M. México. Landucci Editores, 2001.
- Postmodernity and Romanticism. Roberto Cortázar. National Council for Culture and the Art. National Institute of Fine Arts, 1995.
