= Eduardo Chávez =

Eduardo Chávez may refer to:

- Eduardo Chávez (politician)
- Eduardo Chávez (footballer)

== See also ==
- Edward Chávez (disambiguation)
