= Hospital de Jesús Nazareno =

Coordinates: 19°25′43.27″N 99°7′58.56″W

Hospital and church de Jesús Nazareno
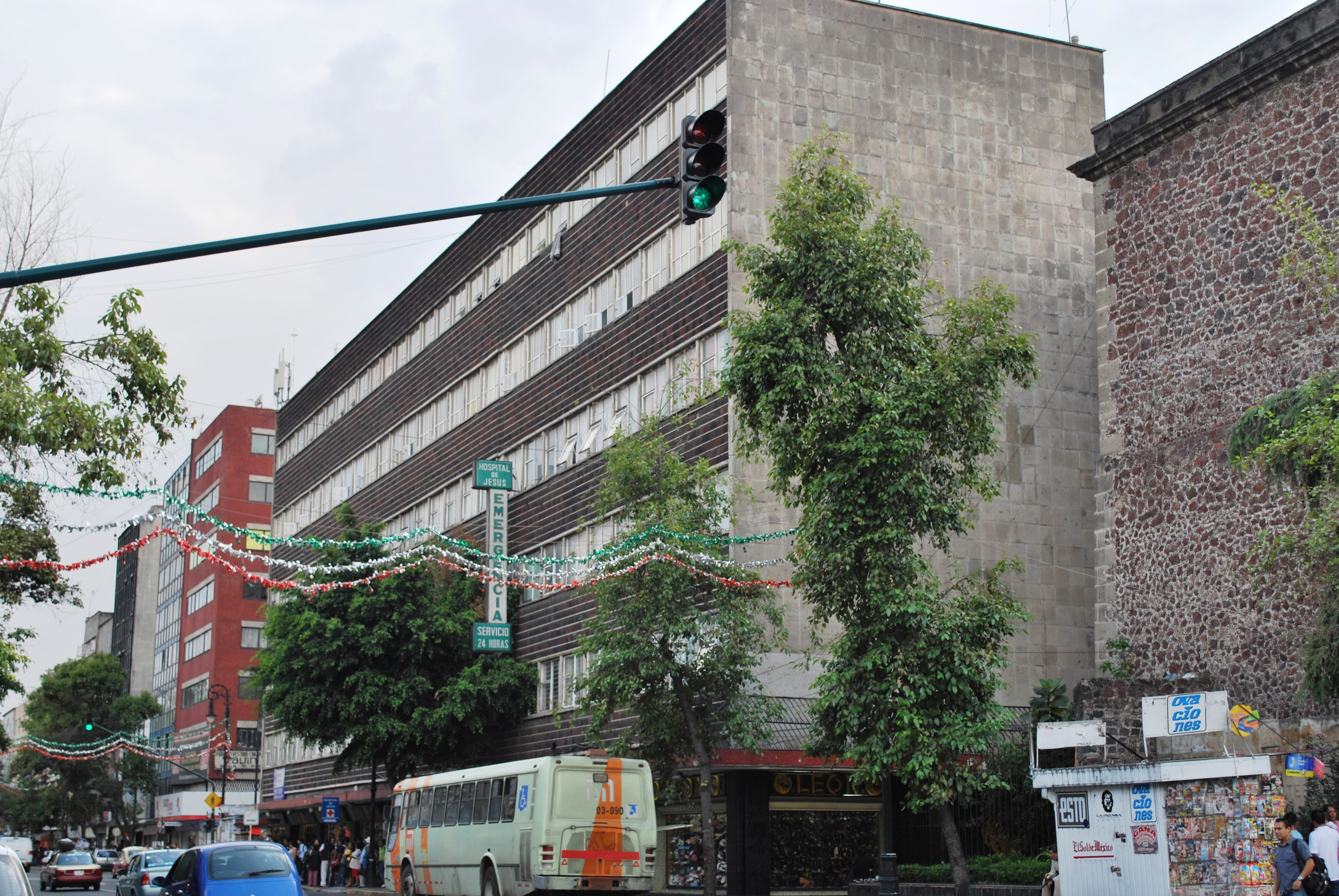
- Modernist façade of the hospital

Geography
- Location: Historic Mexico City Centro, Mexico City, Ciudad de México, Mexico

Organisation
- Type: General
- Affiliated university: Nursing School of the Hospital de Jesús

History
- Former names: Purísima Concepción, Hospital del Marqués
- Founded: 1524

Links
- Website: www.hospitaldejesus.com.mx
- Lists: Hospitals in Mexico

The Church and Hospital of Jesús Nazareno buildings are located in the historic center of Mexico City, in México, D. F., Mexico. The hospital is in operation, even to this day, housed in a Modernist style building, located in front of the original one, and beside the former church. Both historic buildings and their courtyards are 17th-century Spanish colonial era architecture.

== History ==
The Church and Hospital are supposedly located at the spot where Hernán Cortés and Moctezuma II met for the first time in 1519, which was then the beginning of the causeway leading to Iztapalapa. Cortés ordered the hospital built to tend to Aztec soldiers wounded fighting with the Spanish.

In his last will, Cortés states that he wanted the hospital to be built for the sons of the Aztec warriors who had perished in battle during the Conquest of Tenochtitlan. This was not an institution for wounded Spanish soldiers.

In 1646, the hospital was the site of one of the first autopsies performed in the Americas, performed to teach anatomy to medical students of the Royal and Pontifical University of Mexico. In 1715, the hospital published the Regia Academia Mariana Practica Medica to promote more professional practices in the field of medicine in New Spain. The building today continues to function as a hospital.

== Tomb of Hernán Cortés ==
The adjoining Hospital and Church of Jesús Nazareno serves as the final resting place of Spanish conquistador Hernán Cortés, who originally founded the adjacent hospital in 1524. Following his death in Spain in 1547, Cortés's remains underwent a long series of exhumations and relocations across both Europe and Mexico before being moved to the church's altar in 1794.

Following the Mexican War of Independence, a intense anti-Spanish sentiment had led to threats of the tomb's desecration. In 1823, historian Lucas Alamán secretly extracted the urn containing Cortés's bones. To safeguard the remains, Alamán spread a false report that they had been sent to Italy, while actually hiding them beneath the floorboards of the hospital. They were later sealed behind a wall inside the church, and the location remained a secret for over a century.

In 1946, the secret was revealed when an 1836 document by Alamán, used in tracking the remains concealment was made public. A team of historians located the urn hidden behind the church's altar walls. After the remains were formally authenticated, they were then returned to the same wall niche, in 1947, marked by a discreet bronze plaque noting Cortés name and dates of birth/death.

== Buildings ==
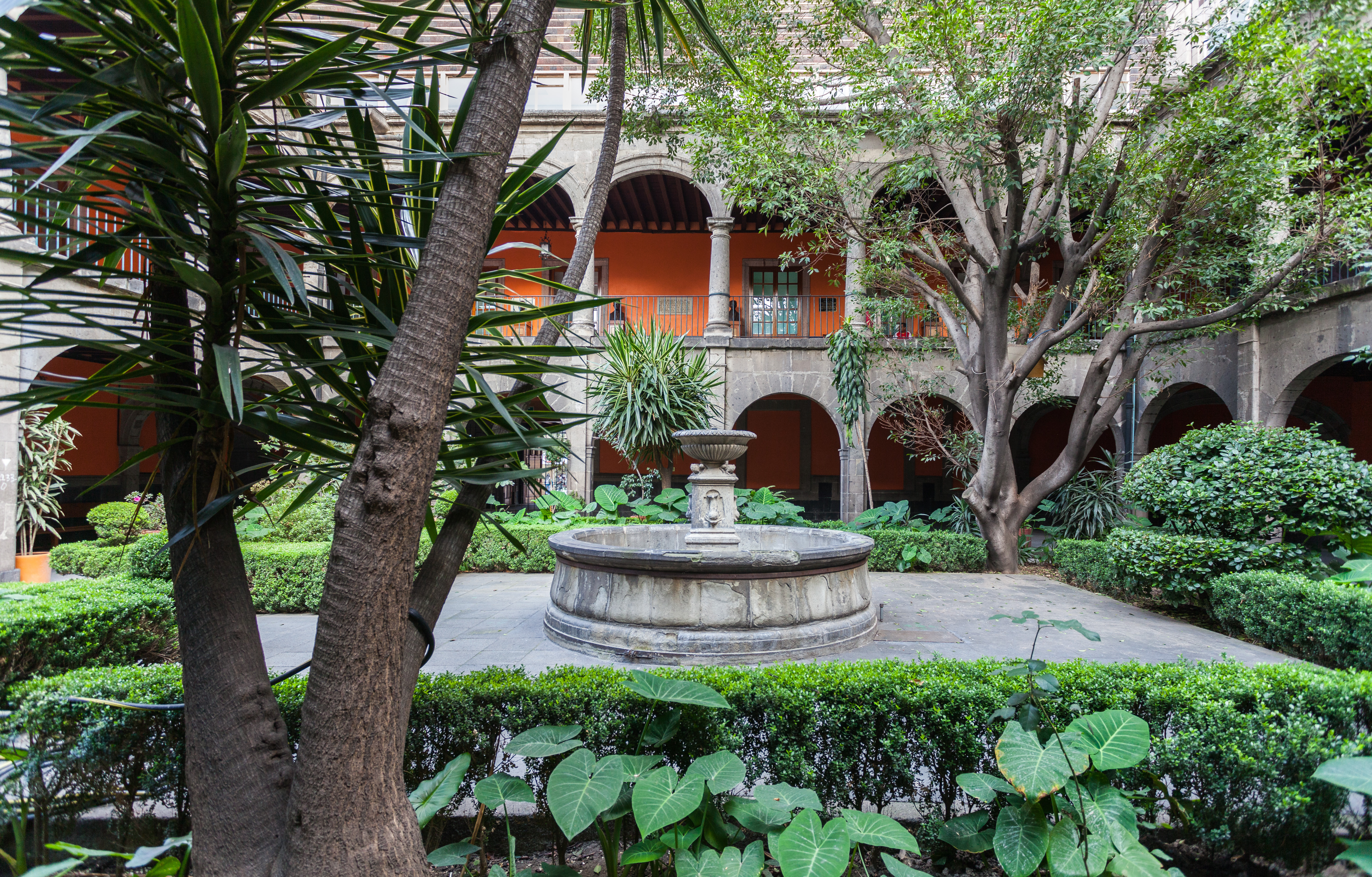
One of the courtyard gardens.

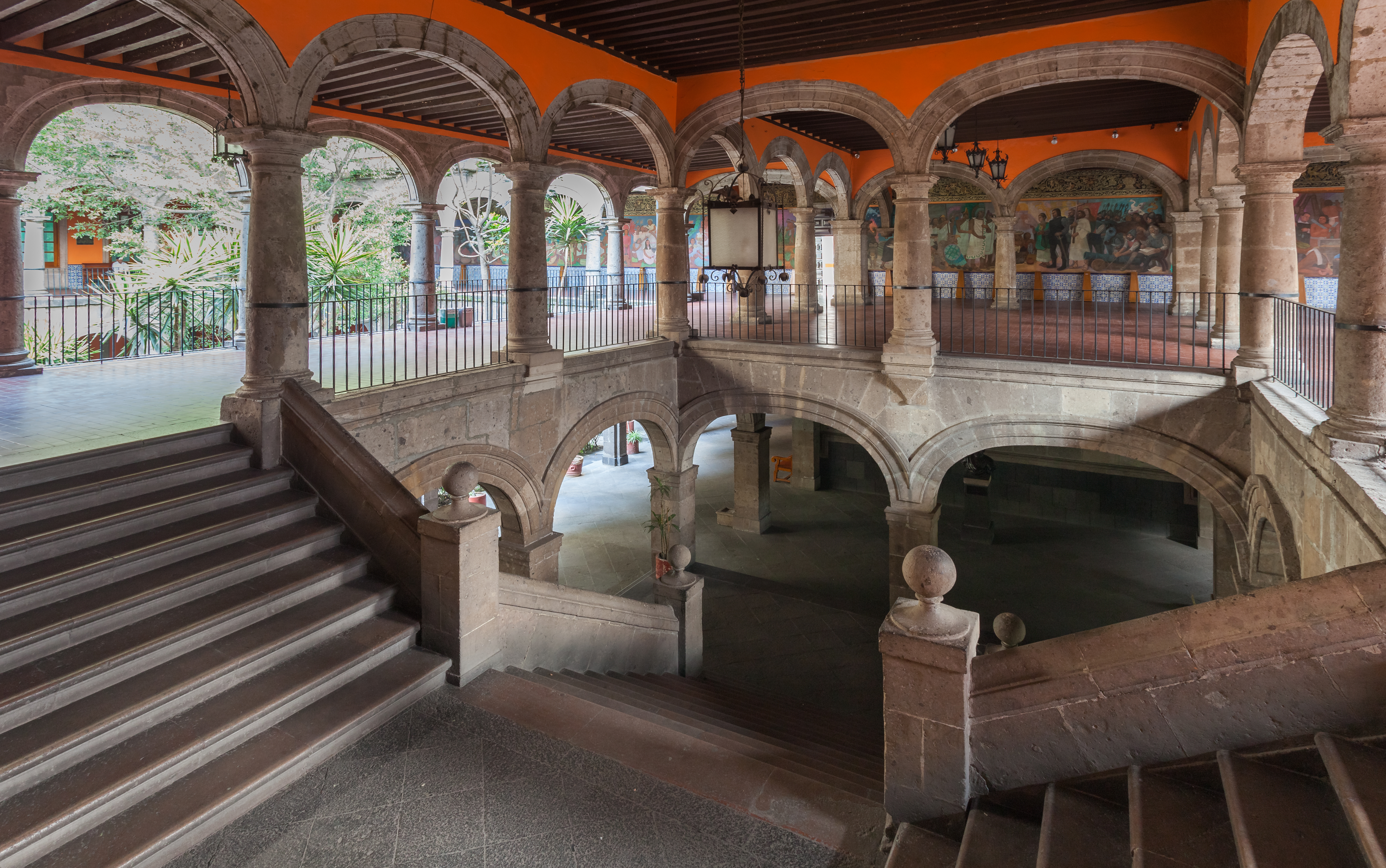
Stairs in the hospital, with murals.

The complex consists of a church and the hospital divided into four sections. The original hospital building is hidden by a Modernist façade, but the façade of the adjacent church is original. After passing the main entrance, one comes to a two-story colonial courtyard filled with plants and a fountain in the center. The hospital courtyard was originally decorated with Tuscan columns, but have since been replaced by equally austere ones. The original staircase remains, which contains a bust of Cortés and past this staircase is a second courtyard. One courtyard was for men and the other for women. The best-known portrait of Cortés can still be seen here. On the frieze of the upper corridors of the south side have a series of small and grotesque faces, which are popularly and mistakenly considered to be those of Cortés’ relatives.

=== Hospital ===
The Jesús Hospital is one of the oldest buildings in Mexico City. It was most likely operating by 1524, although this is disputed, since it was one of three hospitals started around the same time, and various records have different dates for the first opening. The hospital with its church was originally called Purísima Concepción. At the beginning of the colonial period, it was popularly known as the Hospital del Marqués.

The hospital was originally designed by Pedro Vázques, and Cortés left a number of farmlands in his will for the benefit of the institution. Cortés died before the hospital building was finished, and the colonial government of New Spain hired Alonso Pérez de Castañeda to replace Vázques. Six years and 43,000 pesos later, it was still not finished.

130 years later Antonio de Calderón Benavides was named head of the institution and worked to finish it. At this time the hospital received an image of Jesus of Nazareth, and the hospital was renamed after the image when it was finally dedicated in 1665.

To one extent or another, just about all of major architects in the Viceroyalty of New Spain were involved with the buildings, from construction to repair work. Some of those include: Claudio de Arciniega, Diego de Aguilera, Sebastian Zamorano, Pedro de Arrieta, and Francisco Antonio Guerrero y Torres.

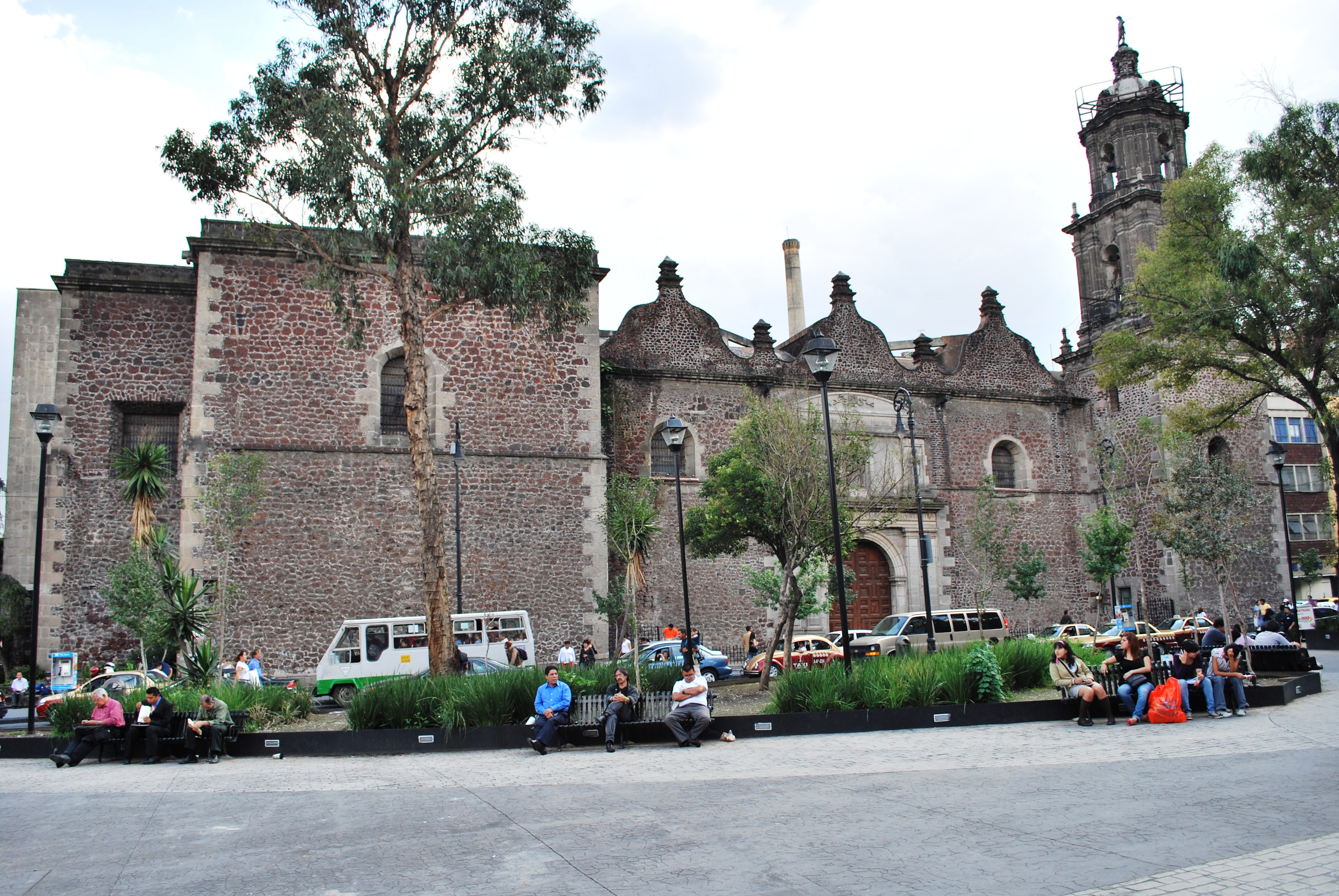
Facade of Church of Jesus Nazareno.

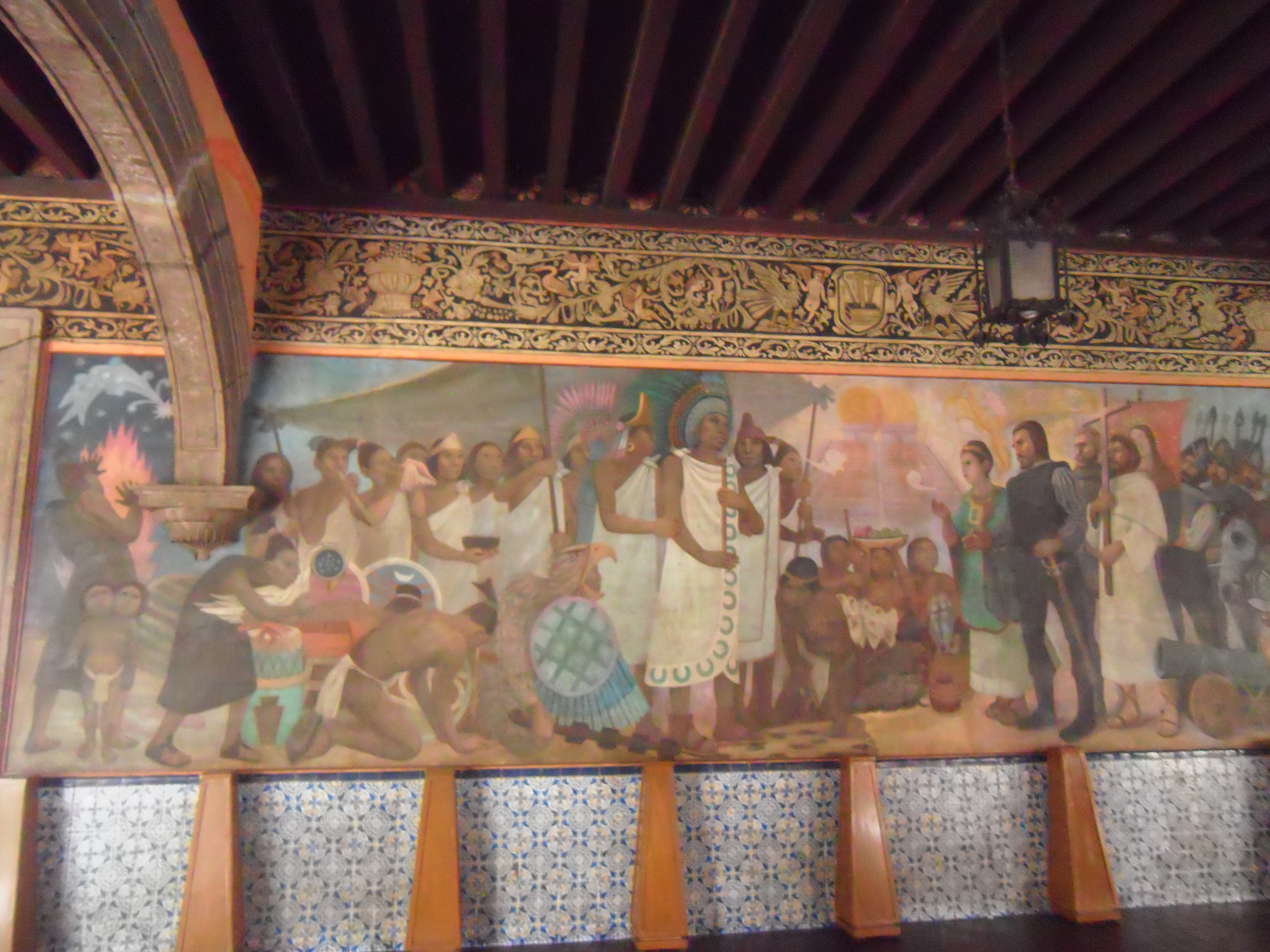
1940s mural by José Clemente Orozco.

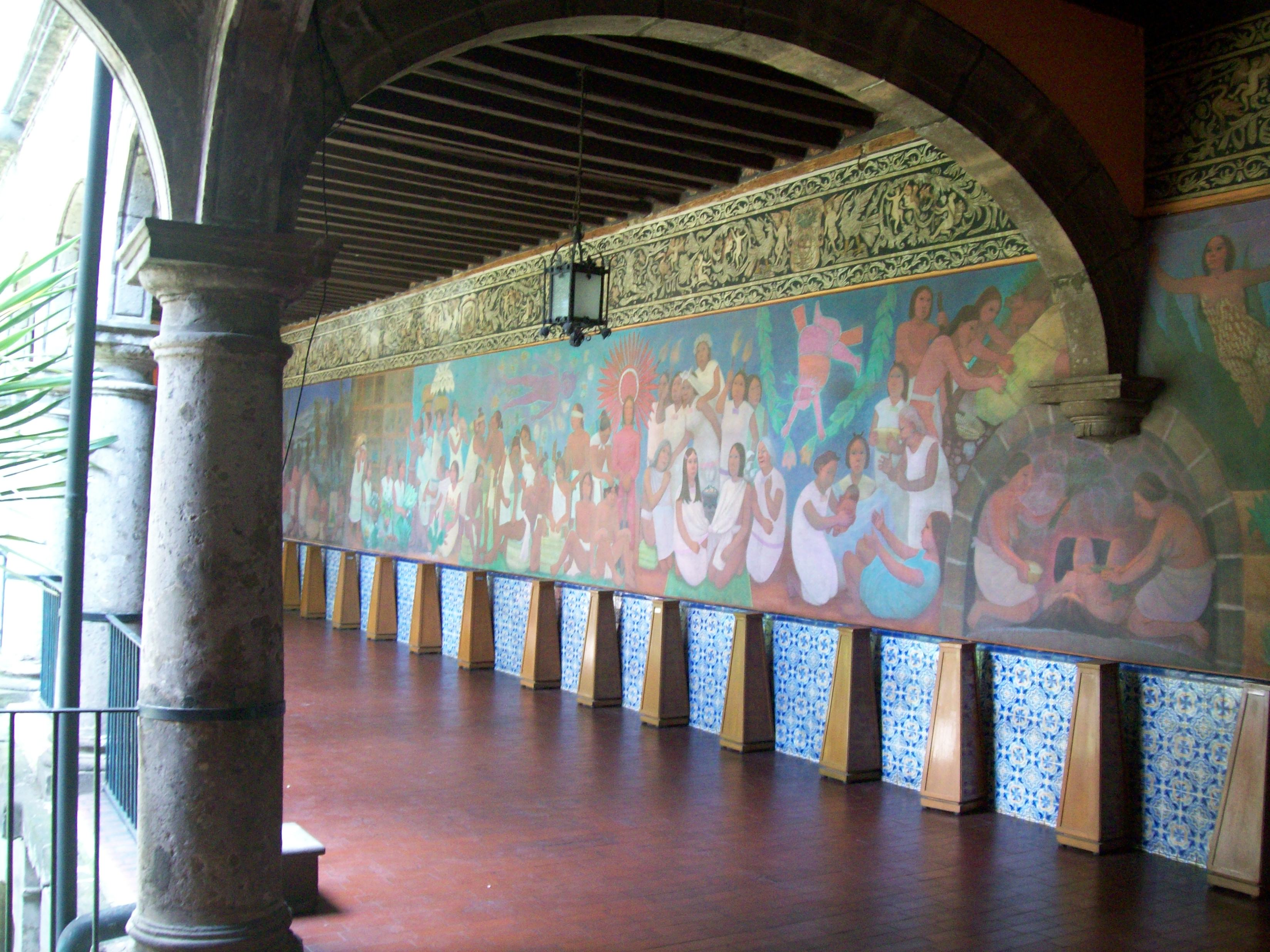
16th century colonial era stone column and Orozco's mural.

=== Church of Jesus Nazareno ===
==== Murals ====
The Church of Jesus Nazareno was stripped bare. However, the choir and part of the nave conserve a long mural painted by José Clemente Orozco. The work was inspired both by the Apocalypse and the horrors of the Second World War. Orozco worked on this from 1942 to 1944, but left it uncompleted.

The small dome resting on the church tower has an image of the Archangel Michael that is often mistaken as a portrait of Cortés. The coffered ceilings with golden flowers on a blue background on the sacristy are the work of Nicólas de Ylleascas.

==== Cortés tomb ====
The remains of Cortés were placed in the church portion by Viceroy Revillagigedo in 1774. At the same time Manuel Tolsá created a bust of the conquistador as well as his coat of arms done in bronze. Today, there is still a small plaque at the front of the church, to the left of the main altar to indicate the tomb. However, in August 1882, there was a proposal to move the remains and place them next to those of some of the heroes of Mexican War of Independence, but this caused an uproar with some trying to desecrate the tomb in the church. The remains were removed to a secret secure site.

== See also ==
- Historic center of Mexico City
- New Spain
- Hernán Cortés
