= Joaquín de Mendizábal y Tamborrel =

Mexican topographical engineer

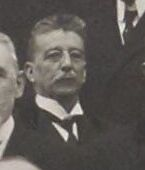
Joaquín de Mendizábal y Tamborrel in 1913

Joaquín de Mendizábal y Tamborrel (Puebla, 29 March 1852 - México, 8 September 1926) was a Mexican topographical engineer. He completed his elementary studies in his hometown and made the school in State College, where he installed a weather station. In 1874 he moved to Mexico City, where he studied military engineering at the Military College of Chapultepec. On September 24, 1874 he graduated as an engineer surveyor, and later joined the National School of Engineers and in 1883 he obtained the title of geographer-engineer, being the first Mexican to get this title.

Between 1878 and 1883 he worked as a surveyor on the International Commission to demarcate the boundary between Mexico and Guatemala. That year, and until 1885, he was the second astronomer at the National Observatory Tacubaya. From 1887 he was an honorary member of the Society Alzate, and in 1891 he made a trip to Europe to monitor the printing of his work table of logarithms to eight decimal places, written in French. Since November 1891 he was the second chief engineer of the Boundary Commission in Guatemala, and he held this position until 1896. In May 1896, he found several objects of pottery in the archaeological zone of Palenque. His travels to Europe became very frequent, and he represented his country at scientific conferences, which discussed issues on mathematics, geodesy, physics, metrology and geography. In 1913 he traveled to Spain to study photography by airplane and balloon.

His teaching career was also long: between 1888 and 1891 he taught calculus, astronomy and geodesy at the Colegio Militar de Chapultepec. From 1906 to 1920 he taught Mathematics in the National School of Agriculture. He taught cosmography between 1918 and 1924 at the Regional High School, and physics at the Naval Academy from 1918 to 1924.

He belonged to numerous European and American societies. In his country, he chaired the Scientific Society "Antonio Alzate" and the Mexican Society of Geography and Statistics, and was a member of the Association of Engineers and Architects. On June 11, 1920 he was accepted member of the Royal Astronomical Society. He also belonged to the Astronomische Gesellschaft of Hamburg, and to the Société Mathématique of Moscow, the Société Nationale des Sciences et Mathématiques de Cherbourg, to the Academy of Madrid, New York, Lisbon and Padua.

Mendizábal was the father of Concepción Mendizábal Mendoza, the first woman in Mexico to earn a civil engineering degree.

== Bibliography ==
- Obituary, Monthly Notices of the Royal Astronomical Society, Vol. 87, number 4, February 1927, pp. 258–259, http://articles.adsabs.harvard.edu/full/1927MNRAS..87Q.258.
- Ernest W. Brown, Review: J. de Mendizábal y Tamborrel, Tablas de Multiplicar, Bull. Amer. Math. Soc. Volume 10, Number 10 (1904), pp. 516–517, http://projecteuclid.org/euclid.bams/1183418017
- R. D. Carmichael, Review: J. de Mendizabal Tamborrel, Tratado Elemental de Goniometria, Bull. Amer. Math. Soc. Volume 26, Number 2 (1919), p. 86, http://projecteuclid.org/euclid.bams/1183425103
