= Luis de Cortázar =

Luis de Cortazar was a governor of the Mexican state of Guanajuato (26 August 1837 to October 1839). Cortazar had a nearly four decades political and military career marked by switching of sides. Luis' brother Manuel, a lawyer, had an important and equally checkered career that lasted almost five decades.
