= Pachuca Institute of Technology =

University in Hidalgo, Mexico

Coordinates: 20.084°N 98.775°W

Instituto Tecnológico de Pachuca
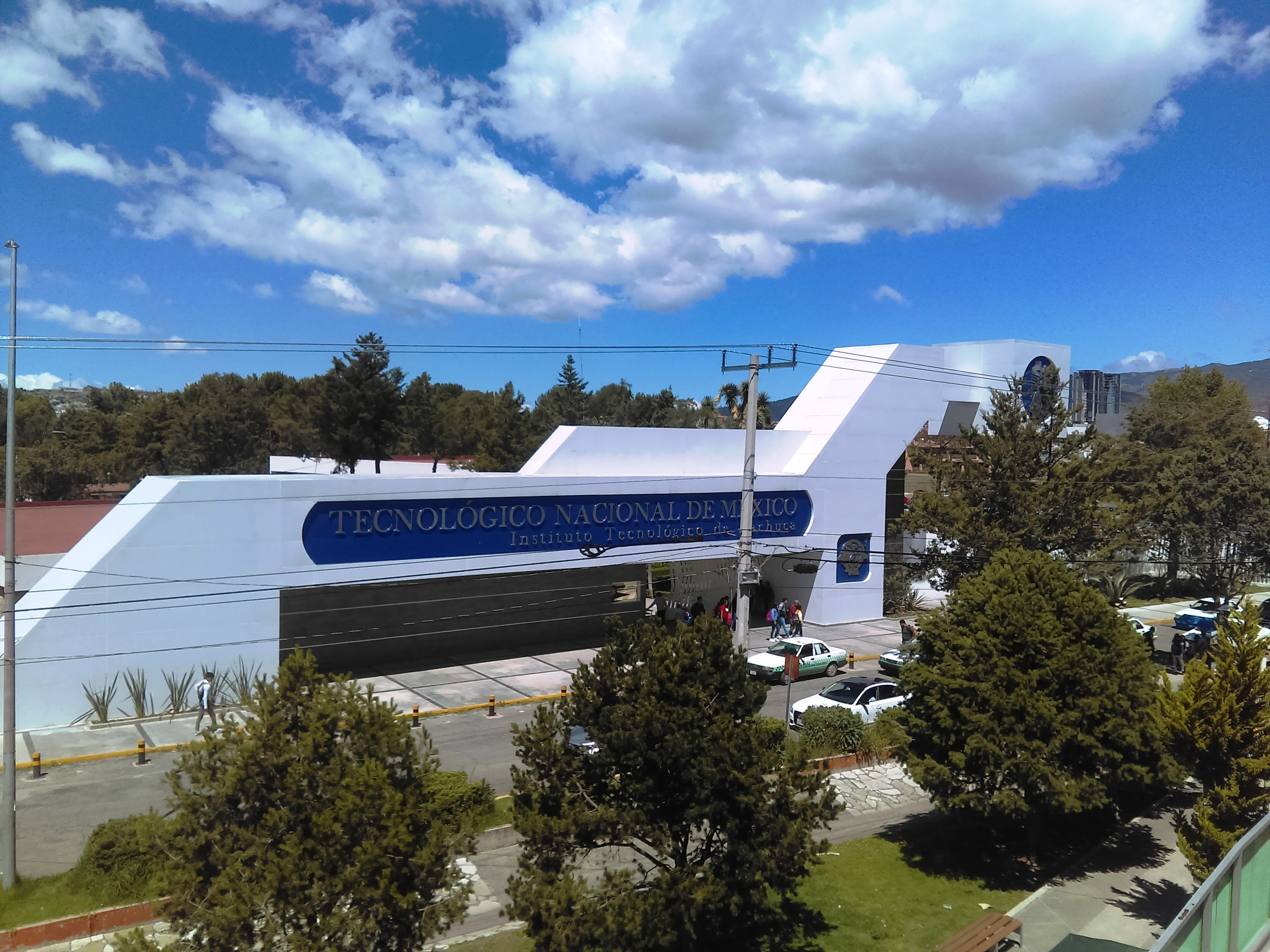
- Type: Public
- Established: 1938
- Director: Francisco Rafael Saldaña Ibarra
- Location: Pachuca, Hidalgo, Mexico
- Website: itp.itpachuca.edu.mx

The Pachuca Institute of Technology (in Spanish: Instituto Tecnológico de Pachuca) or ITP is a university in Pachuca de Soto in the Mexican state of Hidalgo.

== History ==
The idea of founding the institution originated with Dr. Víctor Manuel Ceja Valencia and other alumni of the National Polytechnic Institute (IPN), who saw the need for a local university for high school graduates who otherwise had to move to the state capital (Morelia) or as far as Mexico City and Guadalajara to obtain a college education.

In the 1930s, during the administration of Governor Bartolomé Vargas Lugo from Hidalgo State, it was agreed to build a building in art deco style to the south of the Abasolo Building, of the Autonomous Scientific and Literary Institute (today UAEH), to house the Polytechnic. The building was inaugurated on March 18, 1938, housing the School, also called the Polytechnic.

== Academics ==
=== Undergraduate programs ===
Pachuca Institute of Technology offers programs in:

- Architecture
- Engineering Business Management
- Industrial Engineering
- Computer Systems Engineering
- Biochemistry
- Business Administration
- Informatics
- Accounting

== Student life ==
Students can create student groups and participate in various annual events. Athletics and arts are offered.
