= Ernesto Cortázar II =

Mexican composer and pianist

- Born: May 2, 1940; Mexico City, Mexico
- Died: August 2, 2004 (aged 64); Tampico, Mexico
- Era: Contemporary

Ernesto Cortázar (May 2, 1940 – August 2, 2004) was a Mexican composer, arranger, and pianist. He was the son of composer, Ernesto Cortázar, founder and president of the Society of Authors and Composers of Mexico.

Cortázar was born in Mexico City. When he was 13, his parents died a car accident. He finished his musical studies, and at age 17, began his work as a film musician. In 1958, he won the Best Background Music Award for a Latin American film at the International Festival of Cartagena (Colombia), with the melody Rio de Sueños.

He scored more than 500 films and managed to become the #1 artist of MP3.com during the years 1999 and 2001, achieving more than 14 million downloads at that time.

After living in Los Angeles, California for most of his adult life, he returned to Mexico, settling in Tampico, where he died of cancer in 2004.
