= José Clemente Orozco =

Mexican artist (1883–1949)

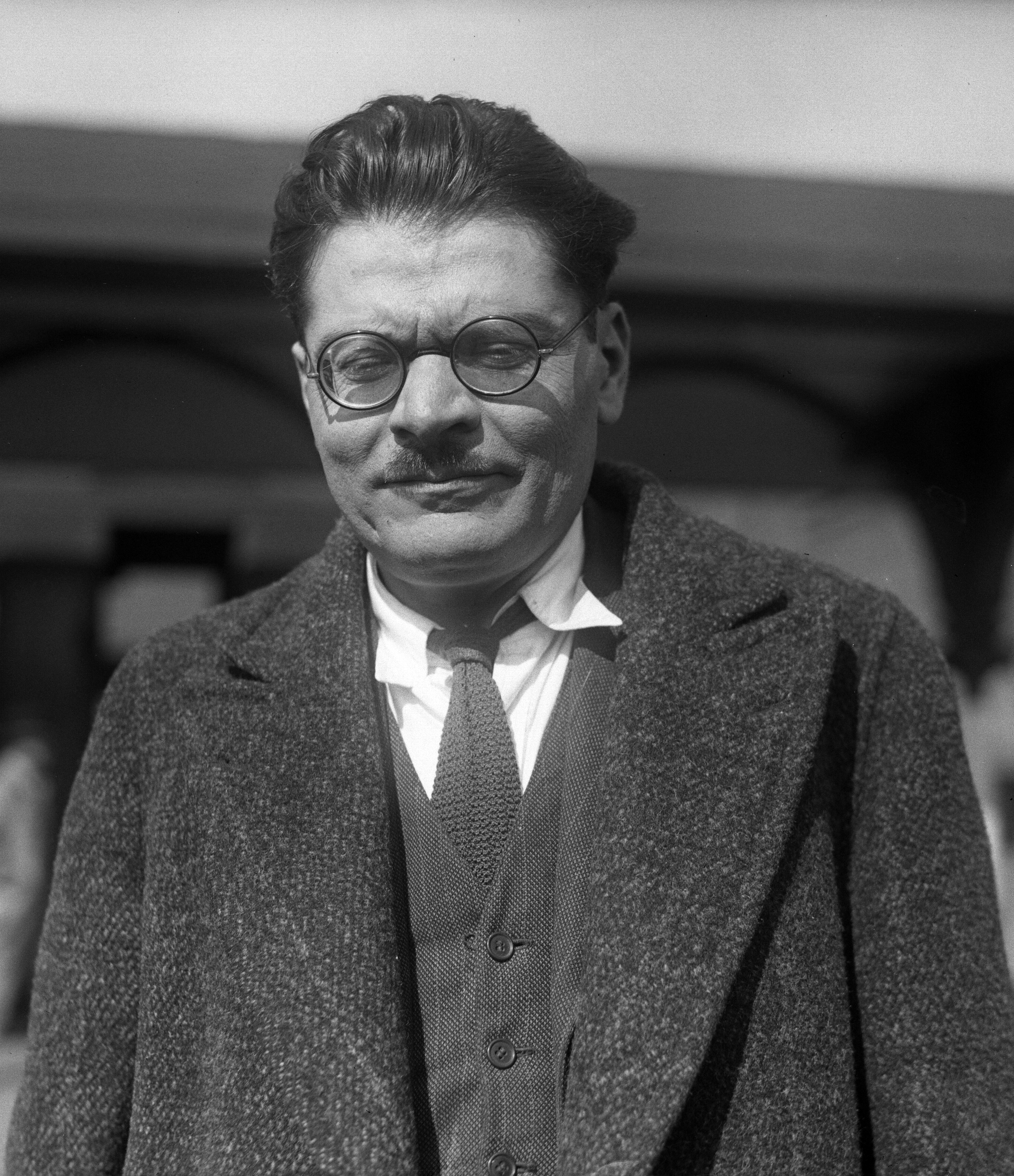
- Orozco c. 1930
- Born: November 23, 1883; Ciudad Guzmán, Jalisco, Mexico
- Died: September 7, 1949 (aged 65); Mexico City, Mexico
- Resting place: Panteón Civil de Dolores, Mexico City
- Education: San Carlos Academy
- Known for: Painting, Muralist
- Movement: Mexican Mural Movement, Social Realism
- Awards: National Prize for Arts and Sciences

José Clemente Orozco (November 23, 1883 – September 7, 1949) was a Mexican painter. He specialized in political murals that established the Mexican Mural Renaissance, together with fellow artists Diego Rivera and David Alfaro Siqueiros, among others. Orozco was the most complex of the Mexican muralists, his work does have a leftist ideological conotation, but less than the Marxists Rivera and Siqueiros. Mostly influenced by Symbolism, he was also a genre painter and lithographer. Between 1922 and 1948, Orozco painted murals in Mexico City; Orizaba; Claremont, California; New York City; Hanover, New Hampshire; Guadalajara, Jalisco; and Jiquilpan, Michoacán.

== Life ==
José Clemente Orozco was born in 1883 in Zapotlán el Grande (now Ciudad Guzmán), Jalisco to Rosa de Flores Orozco. He was the oldest of his siblings. In 1890 Orozco became interested in art after moving to Mexico City. He married Margarita Valladares, and had three children. At the age of 21, Orozco lost his left hand while working with gunpowder to make fireworks.

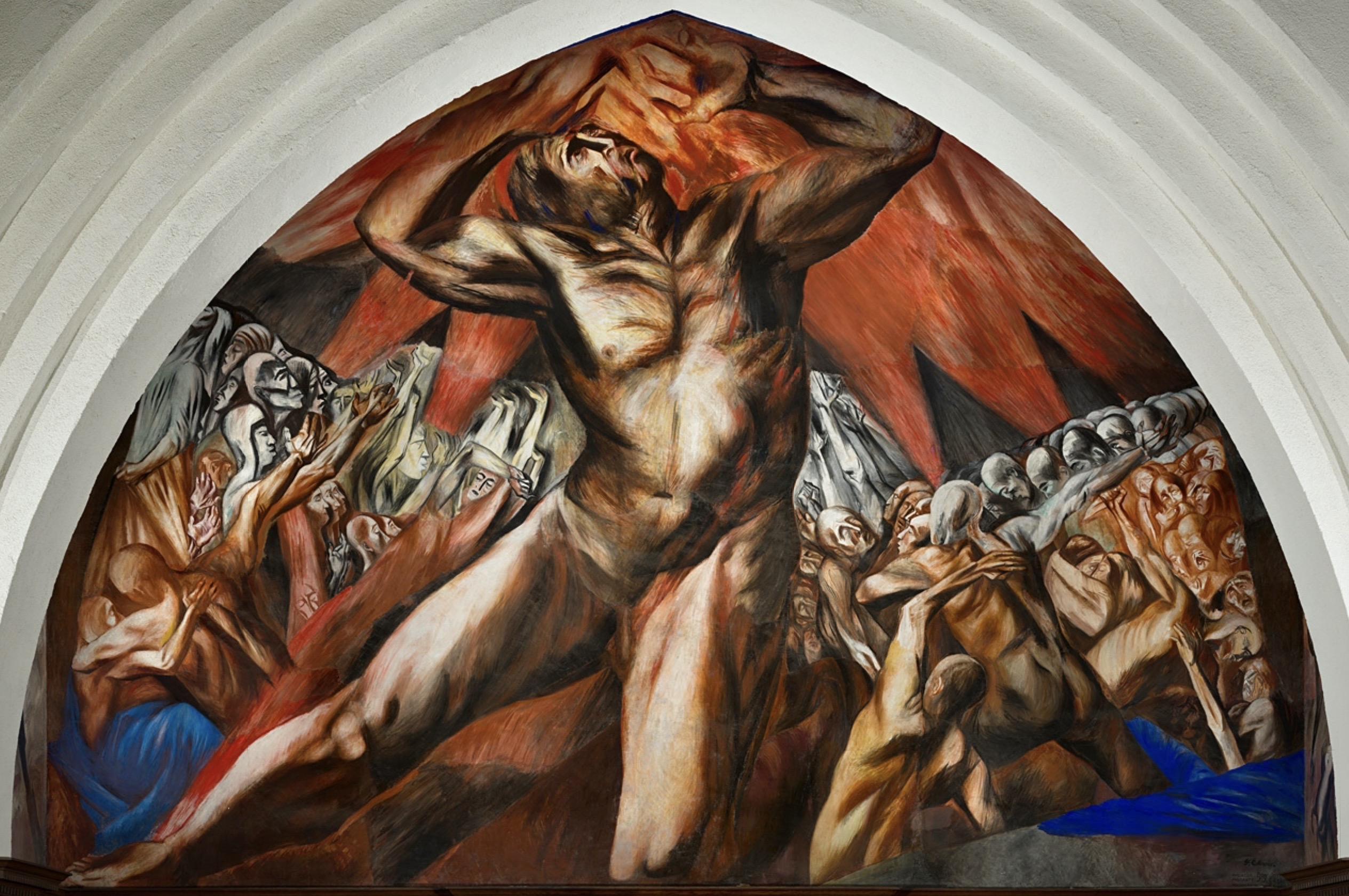
Prometeo del Pomona College, 1930

The satirical illustrator José Guadalupe Posada, whose engravings about Mexican culture and politics challenged Mexicans to think differently about post-revolutionary Mexico, worked in full view of the public in shop windows located on the way Orozco went to school. In his autobiography, Orozco confesses, "I would stop [on my way to and from school] and spend a few enchanted minutes in watching [Posada]... This was the push that first set my imagination in motion and impelled me to cover paper with my earliest little figures; this was my awakening to the existence of the art of painting." He goes on to say that watching Posada's engraving decorated gave him his introduction to the use of color. After attending school for Agriculture and Architecture, Orozco studied art at the Academy of San Carlos in 1906–1914. Orozco participated at the 1911 student's strike along with fellow student and future muralist David Alfaro Siqueiros. He worked as an illustrator for Mexico City newspapers, and directly as an illustrator for one of the Constitutionalist armies overseen by "First Chief" Venustiano Carranza. One of the greatest influences on Orozco in his adult years was Dr. Atl's view on Symbolism. In 1914, Orozco followed Dr. Atl to Orizaba when the competing armies were about to enter the city. When the revolutionary factions split in 1914 after Victoriano Huerta was ousted, Orozco supported Carranza and General Álvaro Obregón against Pancho Villa and Emiliano Zapata. The violence he witnessed profoundly affected his life and art. "The world was torn apart around us", he wrote in his autobiography. "Troop convoys passed on their way to slaughter. Trains were blown up."

In 1916, Orozco, disappointed by the review he received in Mexico about his art, went to the United States. Four years later Orozco came back to Mexico City and began working as a cartoonist. In July 1923, Orozco begun to work on his first mural project aided by Vasconcelos, he participated in the revolutionary war and his paintings reflected his view on the dark essence of the war.

With Diego Rivera, he was a leader of the artist movement known as Mexican Muralism. An important distinction he had from Rivera was his darker view of the Mexican Revolution. While Rivera was a bold, optimistic figure, touting the glory of the revolution, Orozco was less comfortable with the bloody toll the social movement was taking. Orozco is known as one of the "Big Three" muralists along with Diego Rivera and David Alfaro Siqueiros. All three artists, as well as the painter Rufino Tamayo, experimented with fresco on large walls, and elevated the art of the mural.

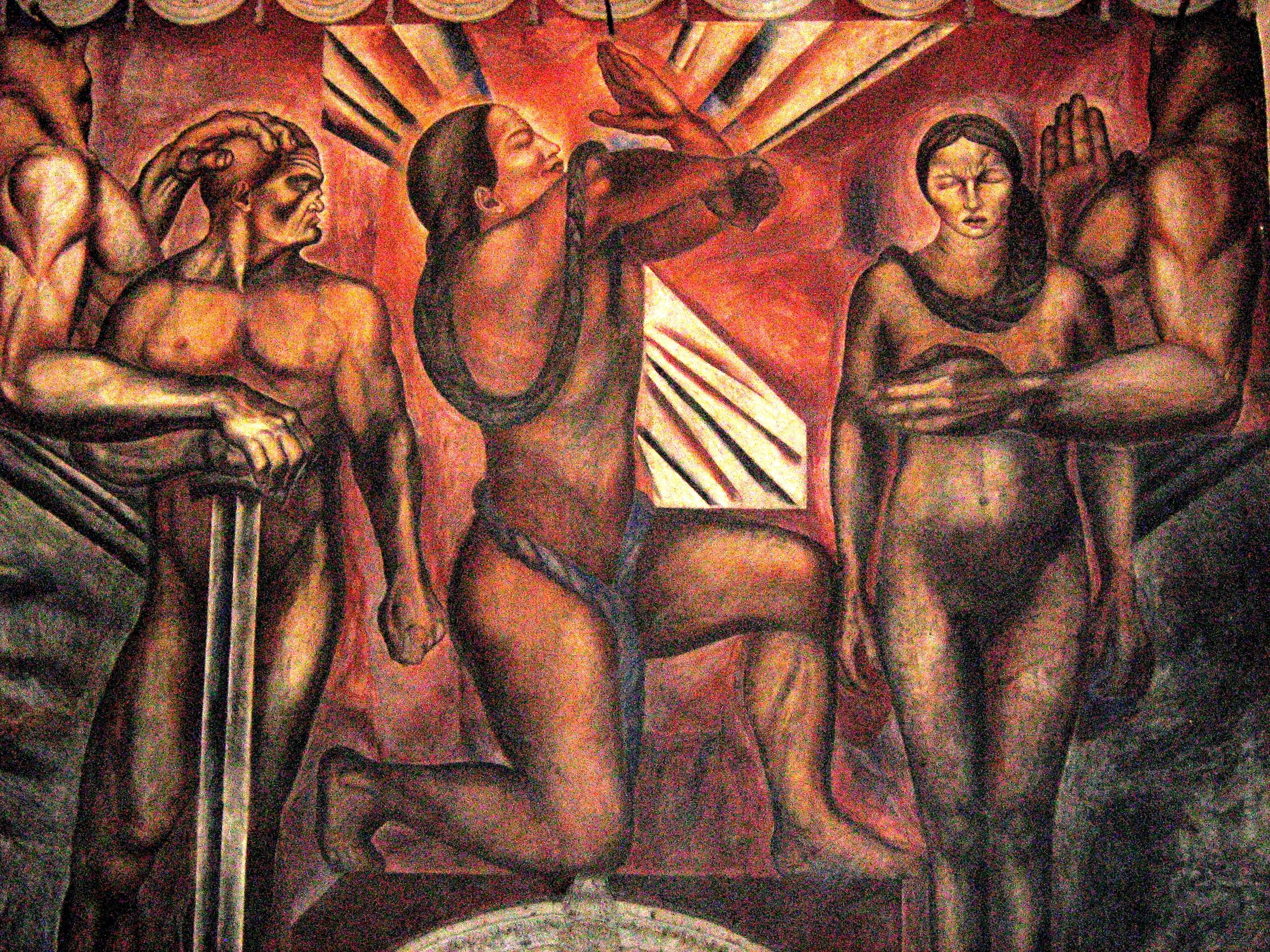
Mural Omnisciencia, 1925

Between 1922 and 1924, Orozco painted the murals Maternity, Man in Battle Against Nature, Christ Destroys His Cross, Destruction of the Old Order, The Aristocrats, The Trench and The Trinity at the National Preparatory School. Some of the murals were destroyed by Orozco himself, and later repainted. Others were vandalized by conservative students and practically destroyed. Thus, Orozco had to repaint many of them when he came back to the School in 1926. In 1925, he painted the mural Omniscience at Mexico City's House of Tiles. The following year, he painted a mural at the Industrial School in Orizaba, Veracruz.

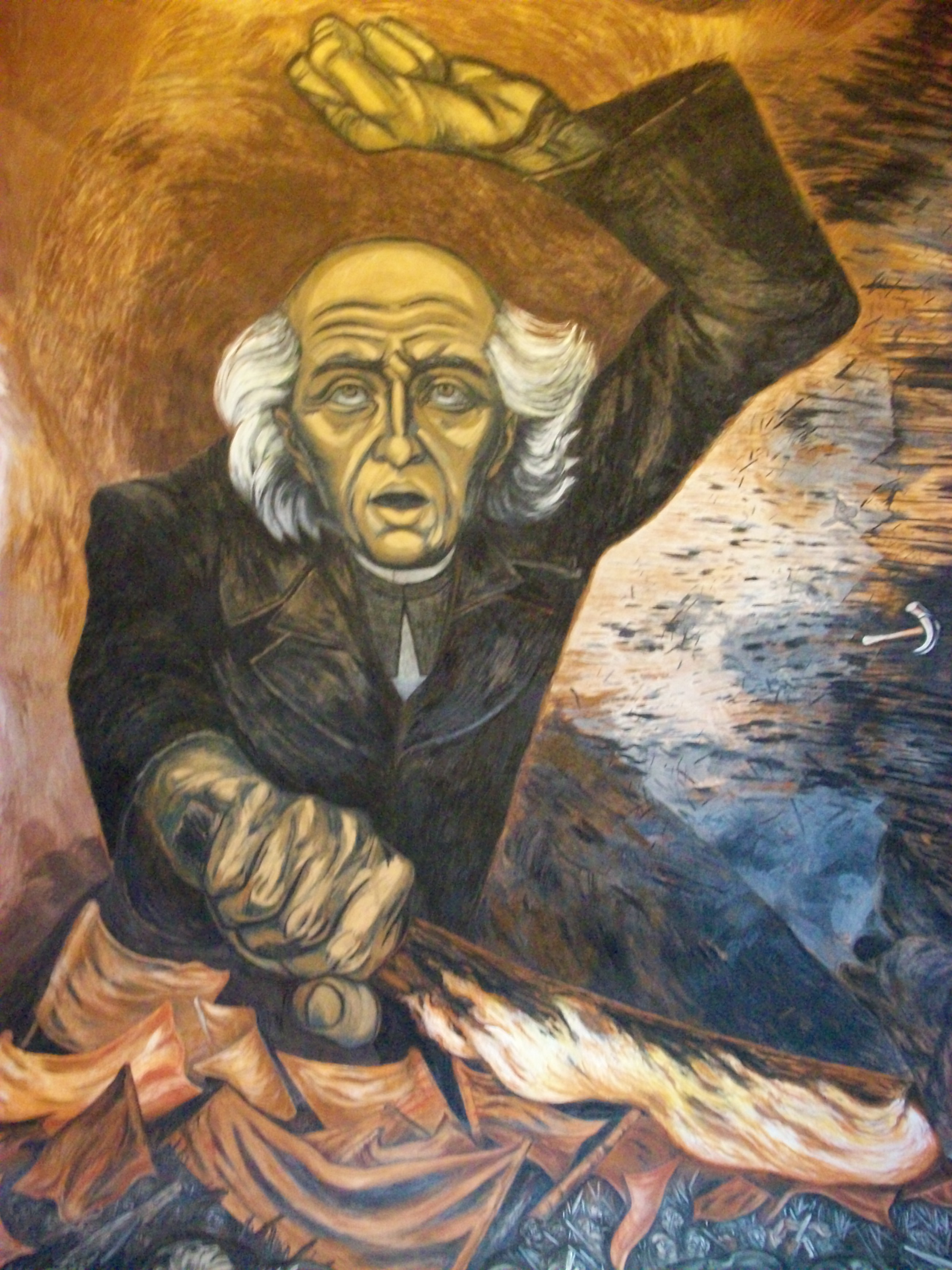
Incendiary Hidalgo, a mural of Miguel Hidalgo y Costilla inside Palace of Government of Jalisco, Guadalajara

Between 1927 and 1934, Orozco lived in the United States. Even after the stock market crash in 1929, his works were still in demand. From March to June 1930, at the invitation of the Pomona College Art Department, he painted what he noted was the "first fresco painted outside the country by a painter of the Contemporary Mexican School". The fresco, Prometheus (Prometeo del Pomona College), on the wall of Pomona's Frary Dining Hall, was direct and personal at a time when murals were expected to be decorous and decorative and have been called the first "modern" fresco in the United States. Later that year, he painted murals at the New School for Social Research, New York City, now known as The New School. One of his most famous murals is The Epic of American Civilization at Dartmouth College, New Hampshire. It was painted between 1932 and 1934 and covers almost 300 square meters (3,200 sq ft) across 24 panels. Its parts include: Migrations, Human Sacrifices, The Appearance of Quetzalcoatl, Corn Culture, Anglo-America, Hispano-America, Science and Modern Migration of the Spirit (another version of Christ Destroys His Cross). His work was also part of the Art competitions at the 1932 Summer Olympics in Los Angeles.

After returning to Mexico, in 1934 Orozco painted a mural, The Catharsis, at the Palacio de Bellas Artes in Mexico City. Remaining in Mexico, Orozco painted in Guadalajara, Jalisco, the mural The People and Their False Leaders in the Government Palace. The frescos for the Hospicio Cabañas, which are considered his masterpiece. In 1940 he painted at the Gabino Ortiz Library in Jiquilpan, Michoacán. Between 1942 and 1944 Orozco painted for the Hospital de Jesús in Mexico City. Orozco's 1948 Juárez Reborn huge portrait-mural was one of his last works.

In 1947, he illustrated the book The Pearl, by John Steinbeck.

While still residing in Mexico City, Orozco died in his sleep on September 7, 1949, aged 65. The cause of his death was heart failure.

== Dartmouth mural ==
Orozco painted his fresco The Epic of American Civilization in the lower level of Dartmouth College's Baker Memorial Library. Jose Orozco's "Epic of American Civilization" is under the supervision of the Hood Art Museum.

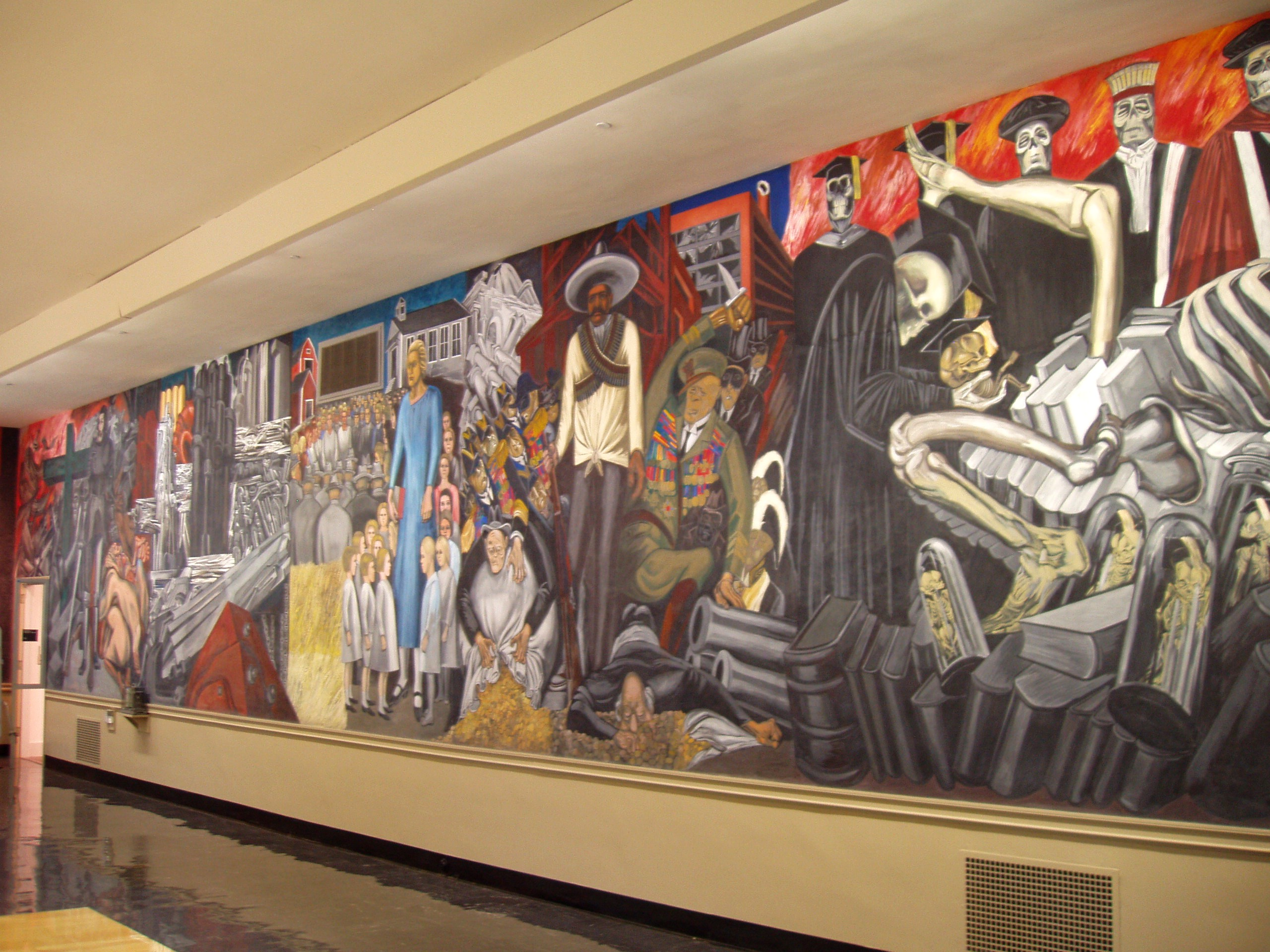
The Epic of American Civilization (1932–1934)

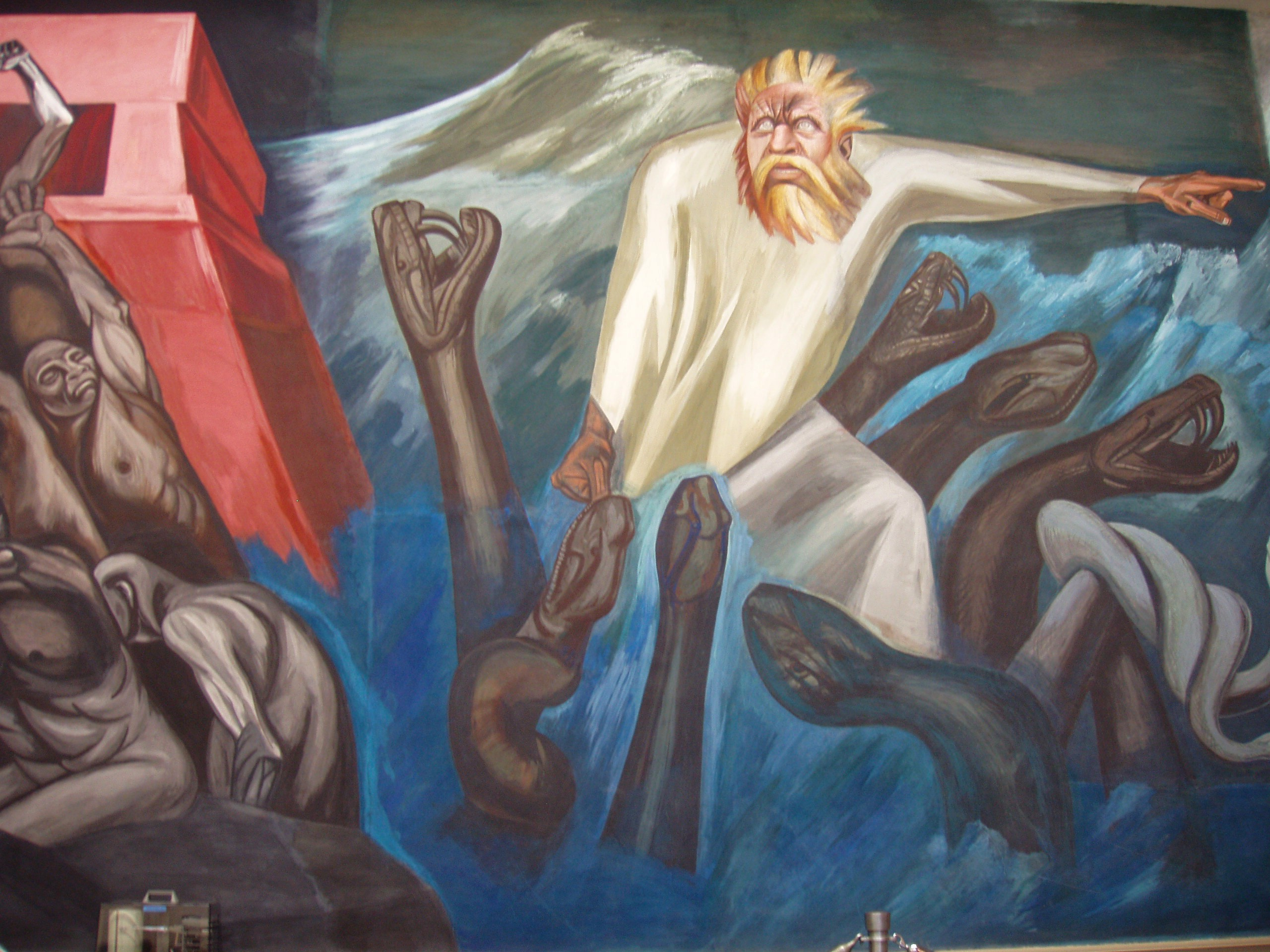
Departure of Quetzalcoatl

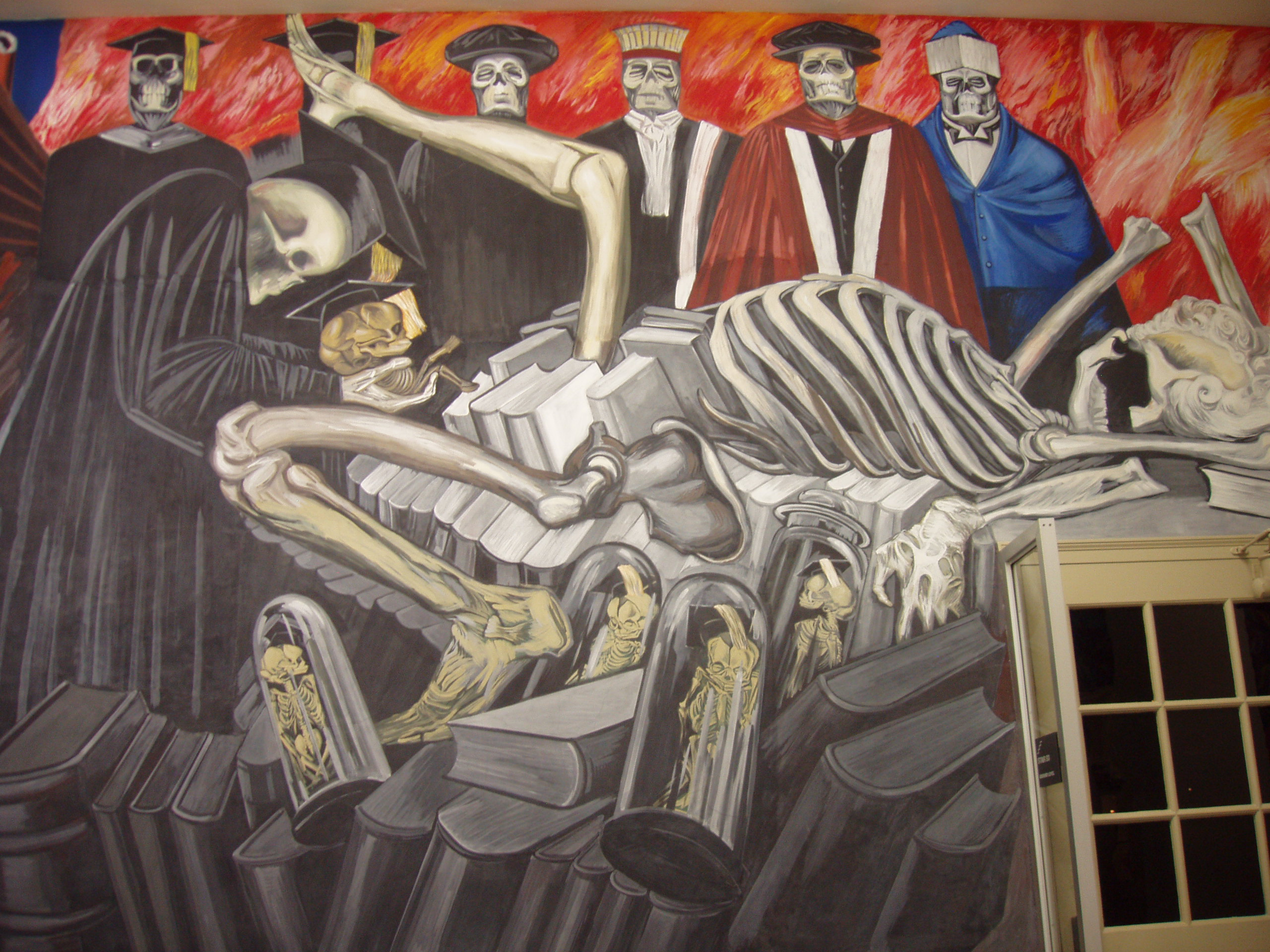
Gods of the Modern World

== Escuela Nacional Preparatoria ==
=== History and overview ===
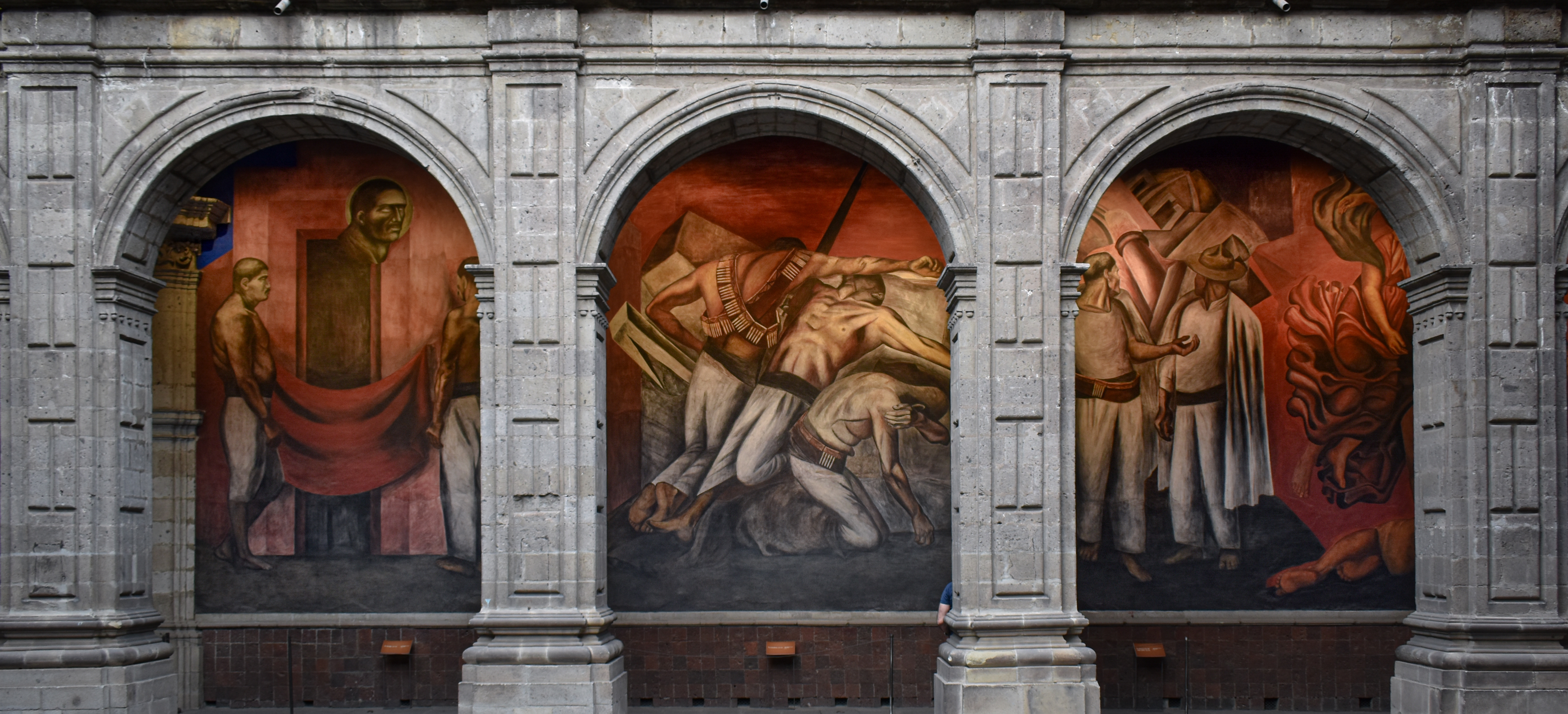
Murals by Orozco at San Ildefonso College. The central panel is "The Trench".

José Clemente Orozco's mural series in the Escuela Nacional Preparatoria at San Ildefonso College spans three floors of the building and includes multiple other murals in the stairway, all of which depict his critical view of the Revolution. The Escuela Nacional Preparatoria commissioned him in February 1923; however, his earlier panels created serious political conflict, causing him to cease his work, like Siqueiros'. He later returned to finish the work he began under a new wave of social change in 1926.

=== First-floor murals ===
On the first floor of the Escuela Nacional Preparatoria are a series of murals, including The Trench, The Destruction of the Old Order, Maternity, The Strike, The Trinity, and The Banquet of the Rich. The first image is "located under the central arch of the ground floor of the north wall and is the only wall section perfectly framed by the colonnade from the vantage point of the center of the courtyard" and is called The Trench. A unique aspect of the first floor murals is that each mural parallels in width to the arched openings of the colonnade. The Destruction of the Old Order and Maternity are located to the right of The Trench. To the left of The Trench are The Strike, The Trinity, and at the intersection of the west corridor is The Banquet of the Rich. Among the murals that Orozco destroyed are The Elements, Man Struggling Against Nature, Man Falling, and Christ Destroying His Cross. An interesting element of the destroyed mural Christ Destroying His Cross, of which Orozco only kept Christ's head, is that he reverted to the use of Christian iconography: Christ is destroying his cross in agony over its misuse as a symbol.

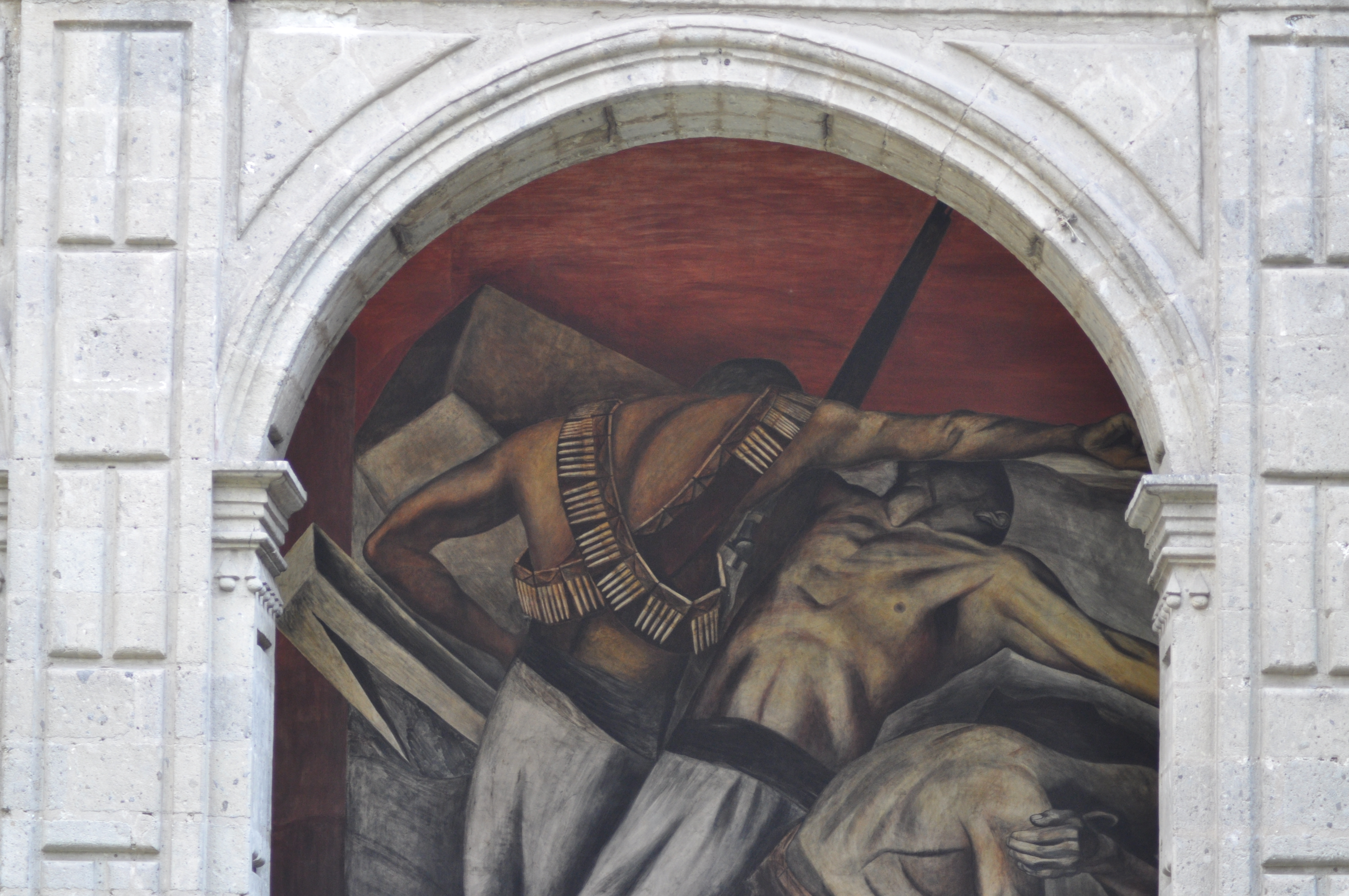
The Trench, San Ildefonso College

The Trench is described as a "confirmation of what an extraordinary and powerful painter Orozco would turn out to be" and is compared to the mural The Farewell, "where the initial impression is of a bloody action scene of great melodrama." He uses jarring muted tones of a darker palette, which matches the dark theme portrayed. Orozco promotes a dignified view of death, as the viewer sees three men sacrificing themselves. Two of the men appear to have died, even though no wounds are present on their bodies, and a third is kneeling while covering his face with his left arm. Their faces are hidden, which gives the viewer a sense of anonymity behind the sacrifice of the many victims of the revolution. This poses the question, is the sacrifice of many worth anything? It makes their anonymous identity more powerful than if they had recognizable identities, because they now represent the sacrifice of the hundreds of thousands of men who fought and died for the same reason. There is also a component of Christian iconography in this mural, as the central man leans spread eagle against a barricade of rocks and beams that resemble a cross, which contributes to the mural's balance but not in a symmetrical way. This is an allusion to the crucifix, with the central soldier playing the role of the martyr, which is further exemplified by his lack weapons. Analysis of this mural and many other murals by Orozco about the Mexican Revolution is summed up by a statement by Antonio Rodríguez, which states "Orozco showed its...tragedy."

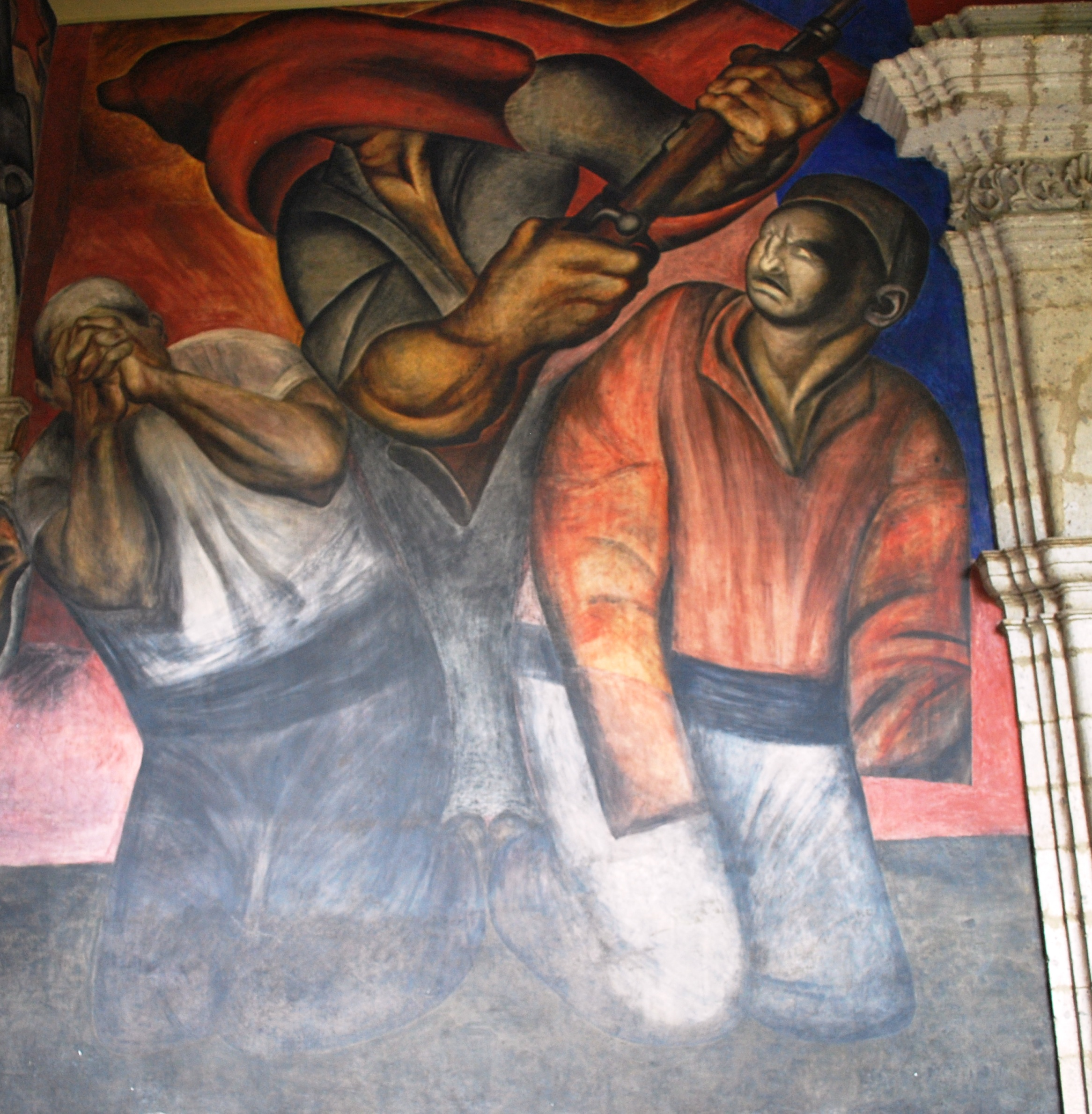
The Trinity, San Ildefonso College

The Trinity is a negative image of the revolution in which a revolutionary leader is the central figure in the mural, "blinded by the red Jacobian hat of the revolution" and threatening the very people he is supposed to be fighting for. The peasant on the right is on his knees begging for mercy while the peasant on the left, whose hands have been severed from the wrist down, watches. This displays the situation of the working class, who have been recruited to fight and do not know who they are fighting or why they are fighting at all.

The Banquet of the Rich displays Orozco's caricature style. It is a depiction of social criticism through the use of satire. In this mural, the viewer sees a depiction of the rich, whose faces and bodies are obviously distorted, which is meant "to represent their decadence and abuses of power" and the working class. It is meant to portray the situation of the working class as oppressed by the rich and in a state of war with one another. This point is further exemplified by the view of the rich who can look down on the working class and continue to live a life of decadence without consequences. This displays the workers as completely blind to their situation by acting as gladiators for the entertainment of the rich. Tools held by the working class individuals in this murals are being used as weapons, which shows "the workers are turning the objects of their livelihood against themselves, have not acquired real weapons and are caught up in confusion about what people and things are really for, treating comrades like enemies." While this mural is not aesthetically pleasing, with its repulsive distorted characters, it evokes thought within the spectator about their personal situation as a member of the working class or of the privileged bourgeois.

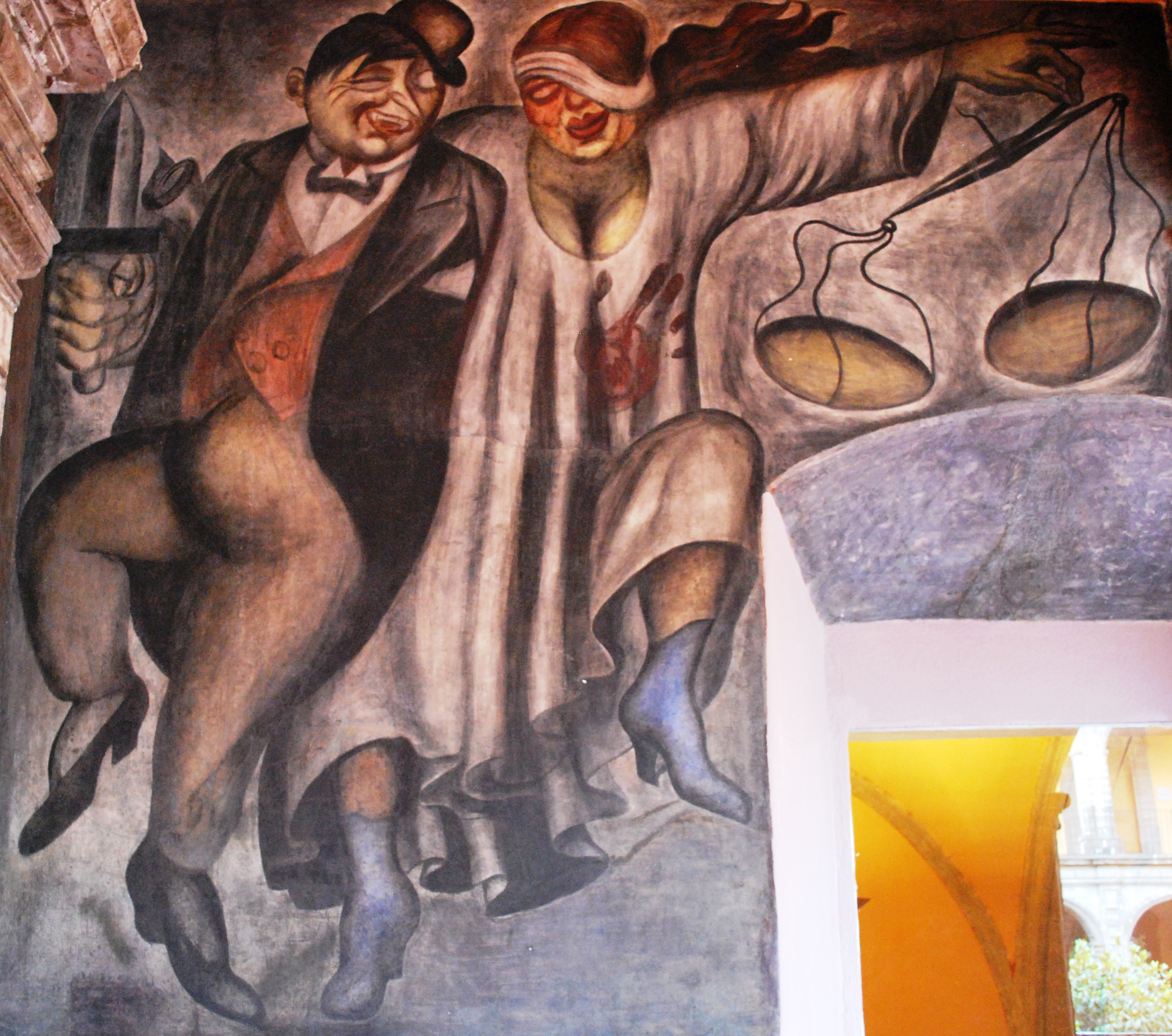
Law and Justice, San Ildefonso College

=== Second-floor murals ===
The second story of murals by Orozco in the Escuela Nacional Preparatoria, which were painted in 1923–24, includes the murals Law and Justice, Jehovah Between the Rich and the Poor, Liberty, Garbage, and The Rich, which are listed in order from left to right.

=== Third-floor murals ===
The third story, created between 1924 and 1926, includes the murals, Women, The Grave Digger, The Blessing, The Workers, The Farewell, The Family, and The Revolutionaries.

The Farewell is grandiose in scale and displays the final moments before the sacrifice of the Revolution. The landscape is somber, as is the expression behind the leftward earthbound woman, who appears to be the man's mother or grandmother. There are three pairs present in this mural: the leftward couple of the elderly woman and the man who kisses her hand, another couple locked in a final embrace, and a third one of two stooping men. The rhythmic pairing suggests a shared identity of the men who are leaving to fight the Revolution. "What this treatment does to history, to real events such as departing to fight a revolution, is to turn it into a natural (that is, of nature), inevitable, and timeless event, or not an event at all but a condition about which humans can do nothing to change since the condition is made of them and vice versa."

=== Stairway murals ===
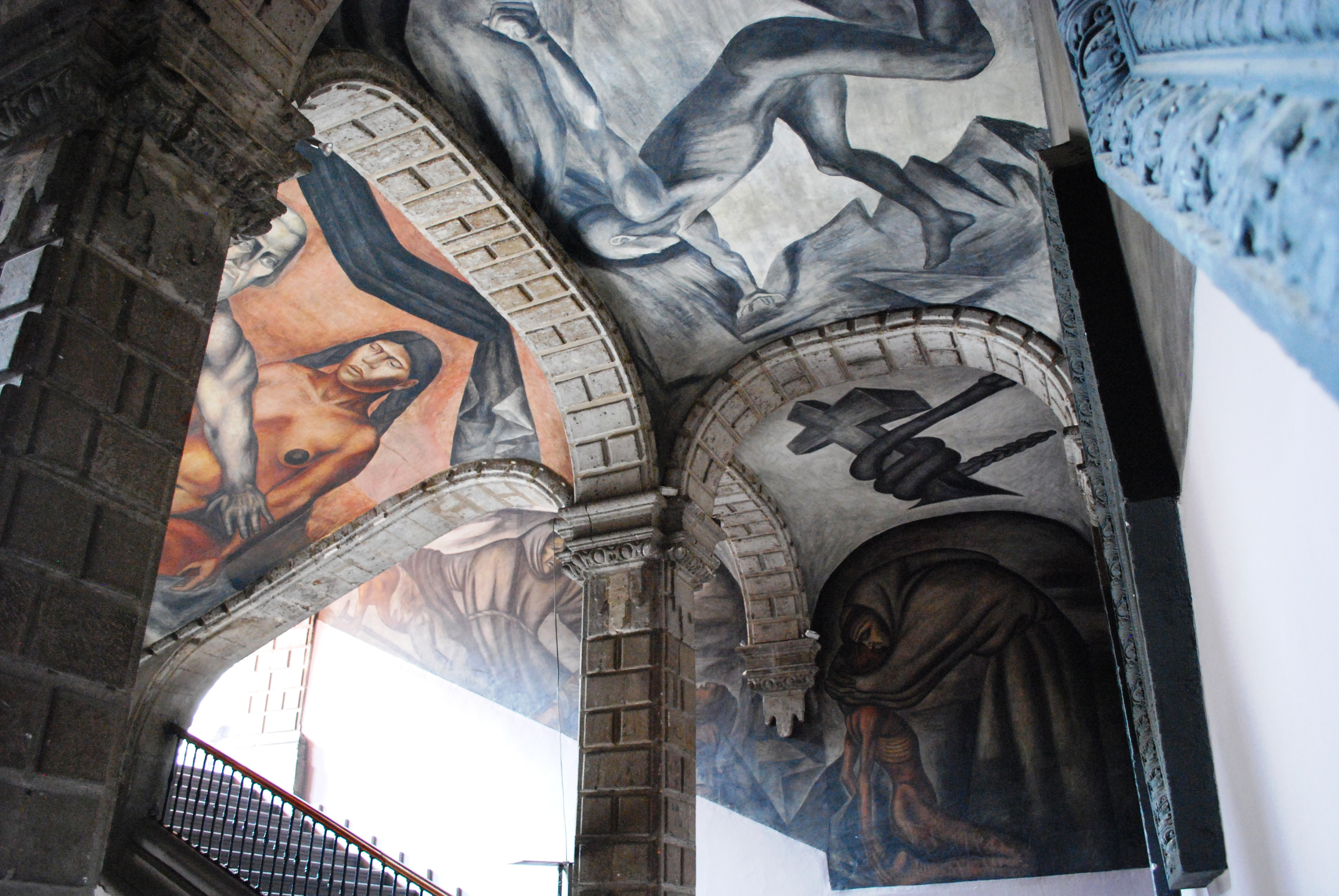
Stairway murals, San Ildefonso College

Additional murals, completed by Orozco in 1924–1926, are "painted on the walls and rising overheads of the ground floor," including Aboriginal Races, Franciscans Helping the Sick, The Youth and Cortés and Malinche. The Drinking Men and The Engineers encase the stairway on the east wall of the courtyard. Cortés and Malinche is a dignified view of the creation of the first mestizo, a result of the Spanish colonialism in Mexico. "This union between the Spanish European conquistador and his female Indian mistress was an incontestable historical fact" and is demonstrated as the two bodies join into one. Their bodies are Michelangelo-like as they represent the "Old World man and a New World woman." Orozoco works to represent the inequities present between this relationship by portraying Cortés' gestures as domineering and Malinche's as subordinate. Cortés' gesture of placing his arm across Malinche's torso, "both prevents an act of supplication for the Indian on Malinche's part and acts as a final separation from her former life." This image serves as a synthesis of the Spanish colonization of Mexico, the critical role Malinche played, and the beginning of the mestizo in Mexican history.

== Gallery ==
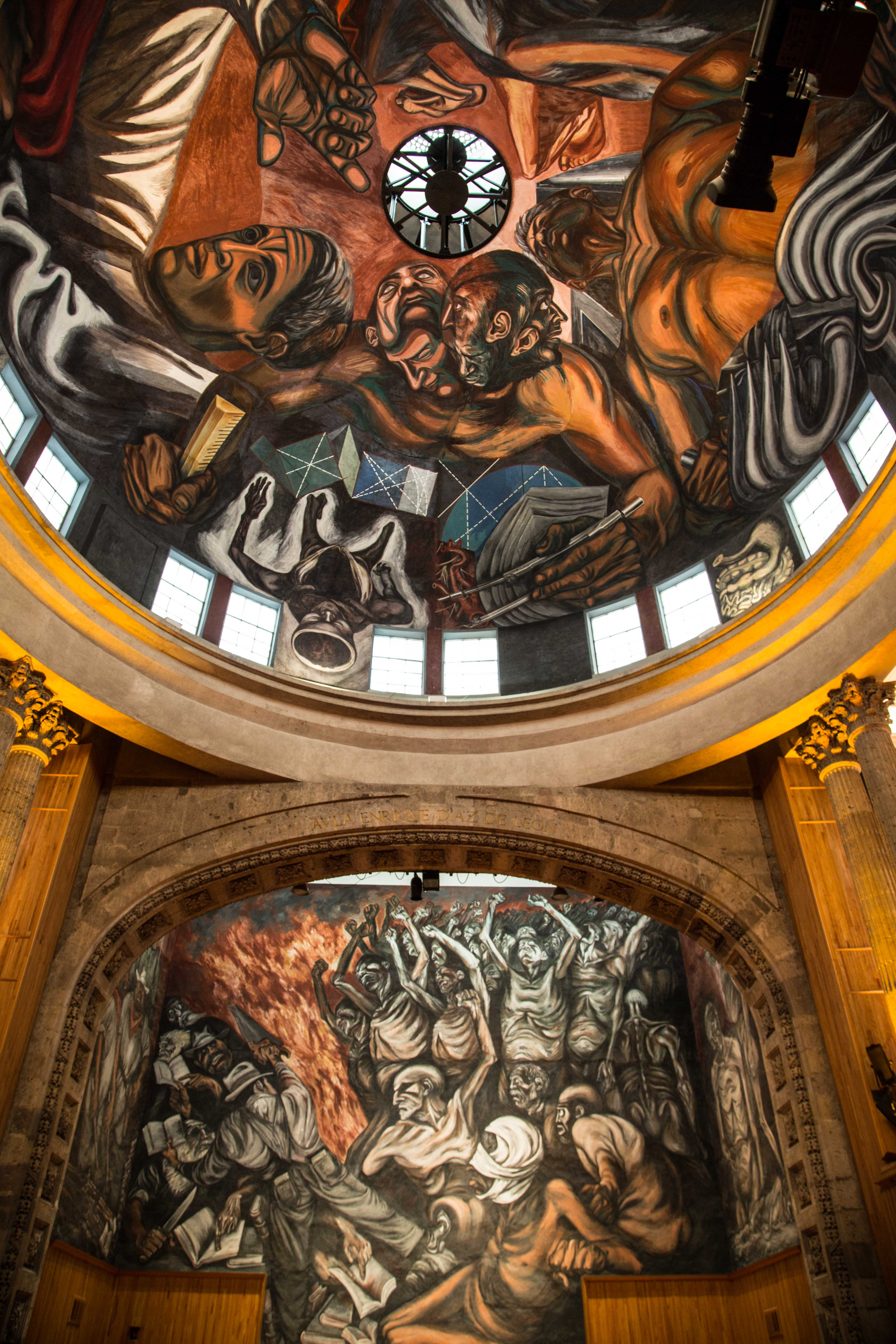
El hombre creador y rebelde y El pueblo y sus falsos líderes (The creative and rebellious man and the people and their false leaders).

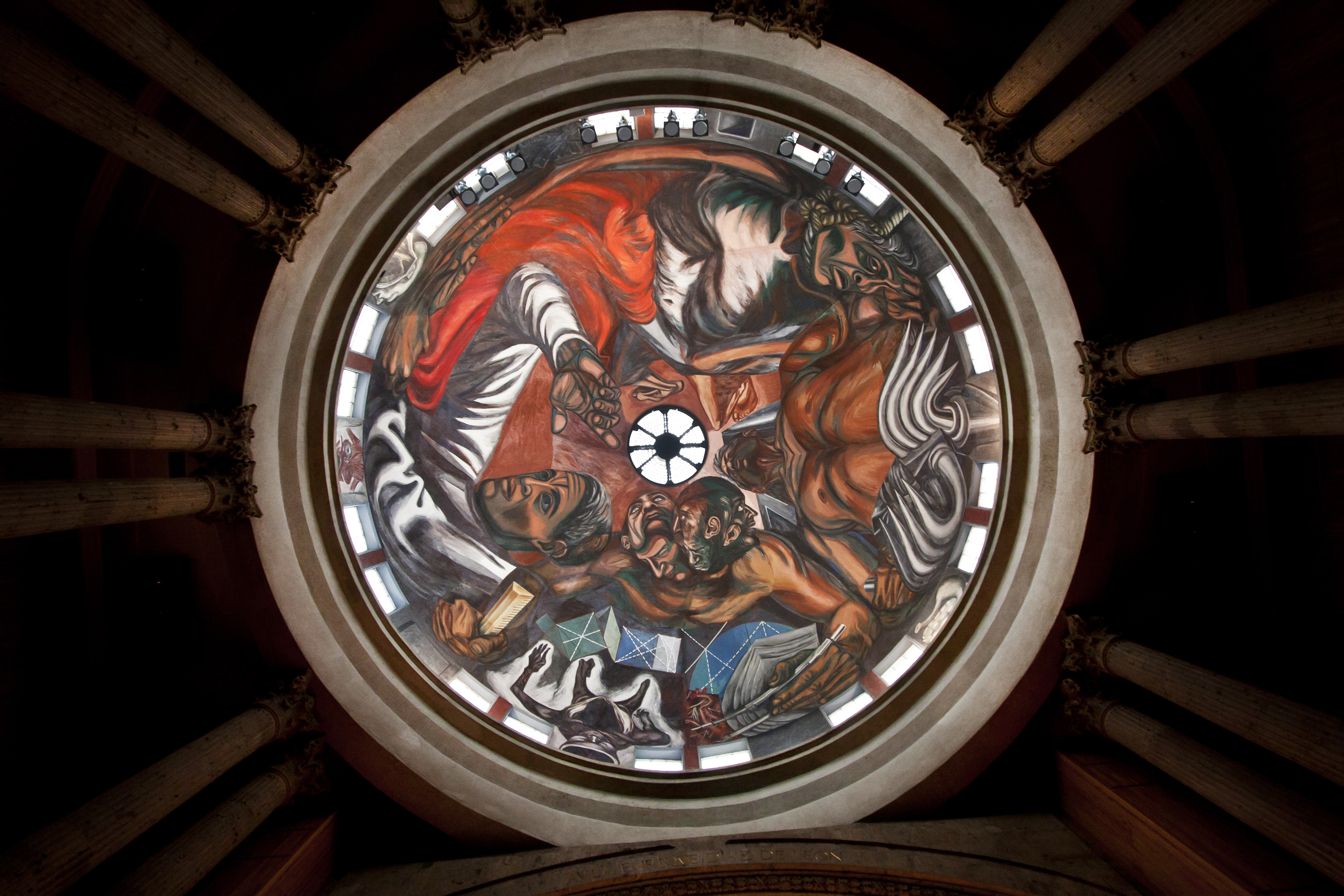
Top part of El hombre creador y rebelde y El pueblo y sus falsos líderes

Lower part of El hombre creador y rebelde y El pueblo y sus falsos líderes

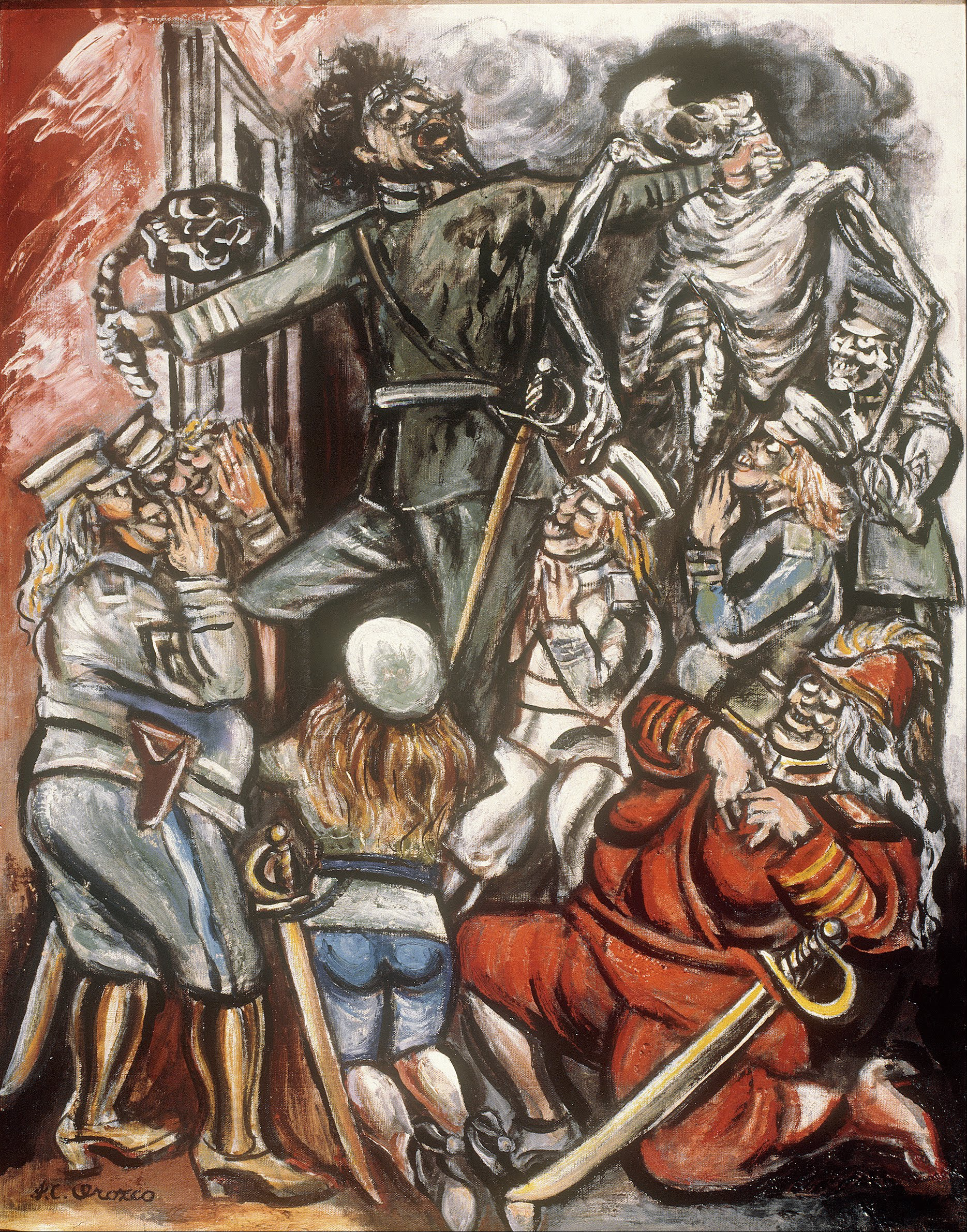
The Demagogue

== Tribute ==
On November 23, 2017, Google celebrated his 134th birthday with a Google Doodle.

== Exhibitions ==
- "¡Orozco!" by The Ministry of Foreign Affairs and the Institute of Fine Arts, Mexico at The Museum of Modern Art, Oxford, 1980.
- "José Clemente Orozco in the United States, 1927–1934" at the Hood Museum of Art, Hanover NH, 2002.
- "Vida Americana: Mexican Muralists Remake American Art, 1925–1945" at the Whitney Museum of American Art, New York, 2020.

== Selected artworks ==
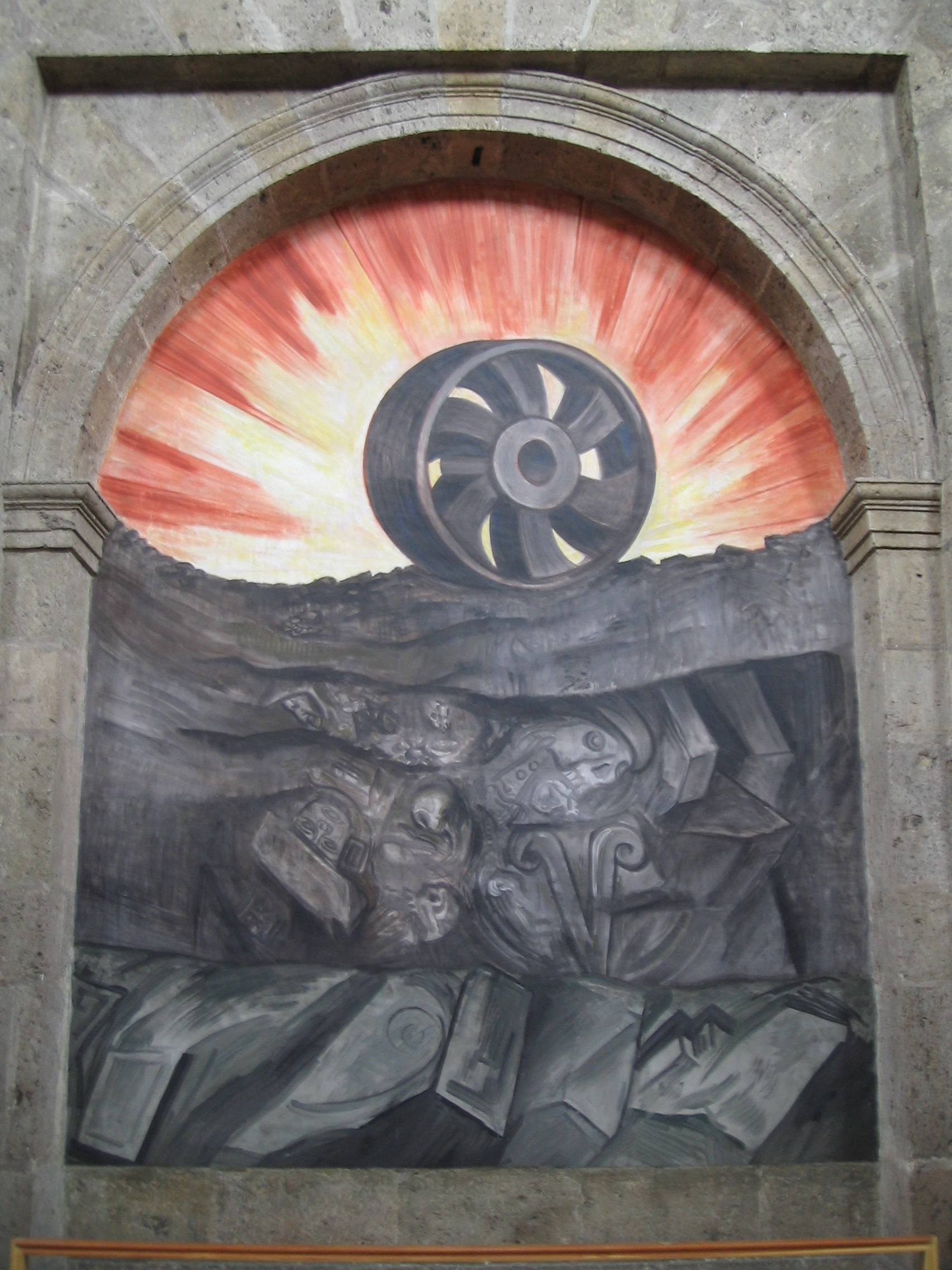
A Mural painting from Orozco in Hospicio Cabañas, Guadalajara, Mexico

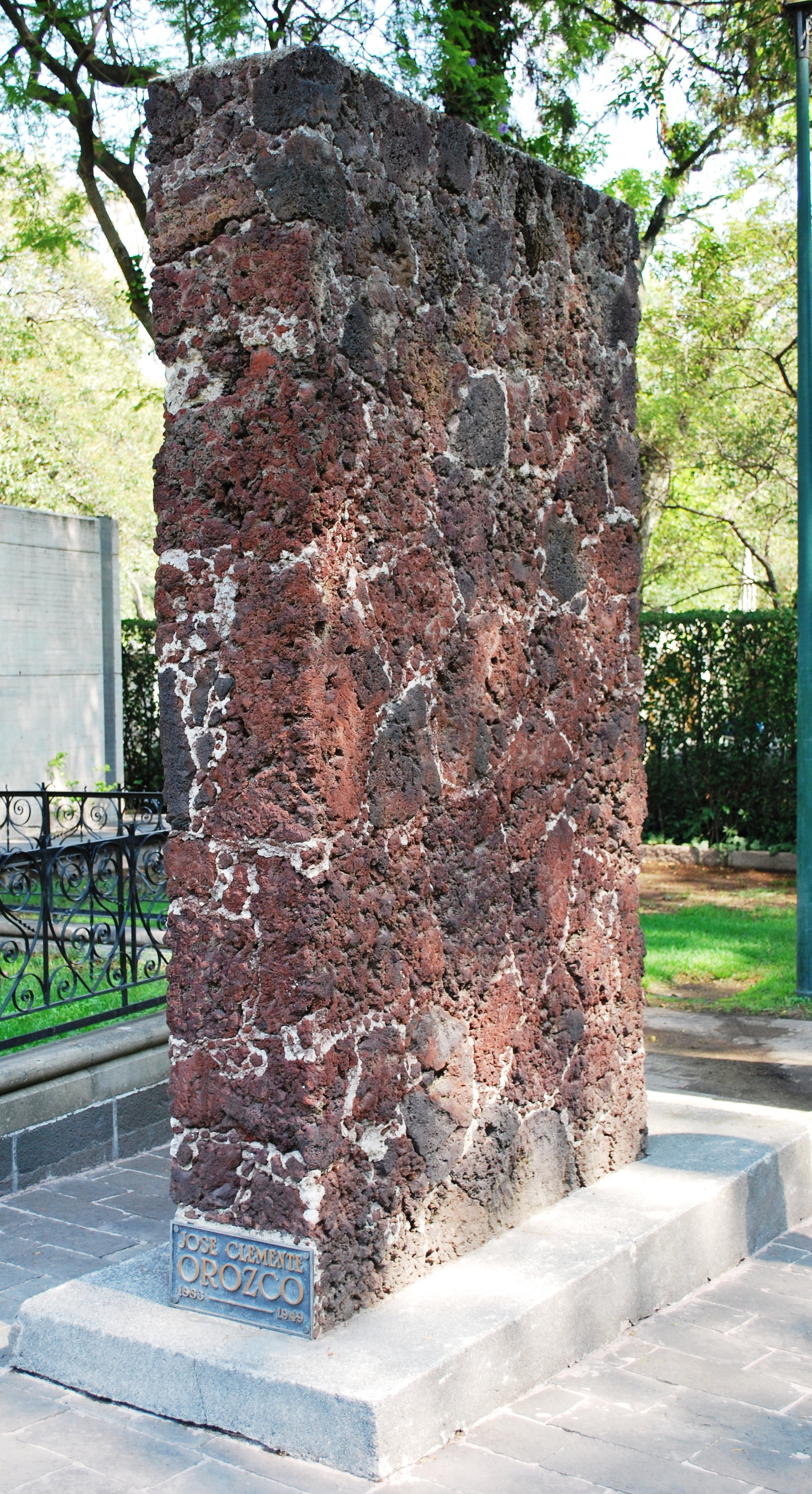
Tomb of José Clemente Orozco

- Praying Hands, 1900–24
- Man Struggling Against Nature, 1923–24
- Man Falling, 1923–24
- Christ Destroying His Cross, 1923–24
- Law and Justice, 1923–24
- Jehovah Between the Rich and the Poor, 1923–24
- At San Ildefonso College
  - Maternity, 1923–24
  - The Banquet of the Rich, 1923–24
  - The Strike, 1923–24
  - The Elements, 1923–24
  - Liberty, 1923–24
  - Garbage, 1923–24
  - The Rich, 1923–24
  - Women, 1924–26
  - The Grave Digger, 1924–26
  - The Blessing, 1924–26
  - The Workers, 1924–26
  - The Farewell, 1924–26
  - The Family, 1924–26
  - The Revolutionaries, 1924–26
  - Aboriginal Races, 1924–26
  - Franciscans Helping the Sick, 1924–26
  - Cortés and Malinche, 1924–26
  - The Drinking Men, 1924–26
  - Engineers, 1924–26
  - The Trench, 1926
  - The Destruction of the Old Order, 1926
- The Subway, 1928
- Échate la otra, 1930, Cleveland Museum of Art
- Wounded Soldier, 1930, Cleveland Museum of Art
- At Dartmouth College Library
  - American Civilization: Modern Human Sacrifice, 1932
  - American Civilization: Ancient Human Sacrifice, 1932
  - American Civilization: The Gods of The Modern World, 1932

== See also ==
- Mexican art
- Mexican Muralism
