= Concepción Mendizábal Mendoza =

Mexican civil engineer

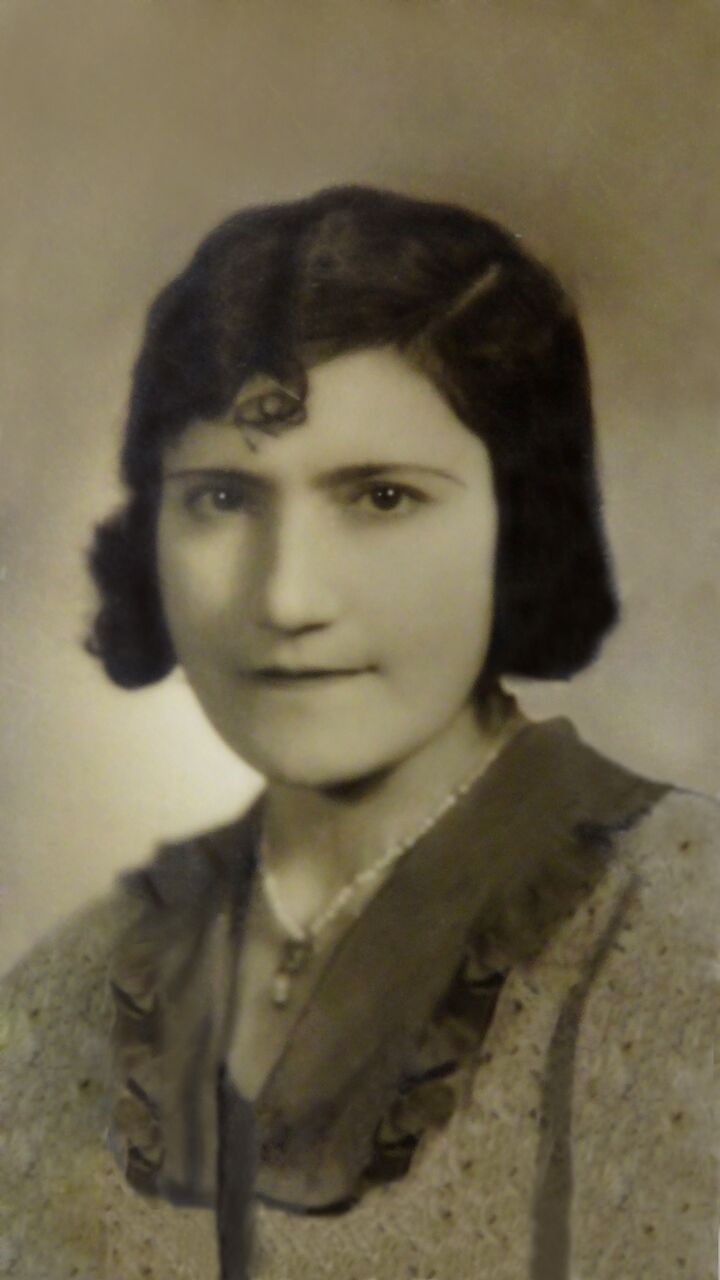
- Born: March 4, 1893; Mexico City, Mexico
- Died: November 23, 1985 (aged 92)
- Education: Palacio de Minería
- Occupation: civil engineer
- Parent: Joaquín de Mendizábal y Tamborrel

Concepción Mendizábal Mendoza (March 4, 1893 – November 23, 1985) was a Mexican civil engineer. Mendizábal is recognized the first woman in Mexico to earn a civil engineering degree. She attended the Palacio de Minería starting in 1921 and successfully passed the engineering exam on February 11, 1930.

== Early life ==
Mendizábal was born in Mexico City on March 4, 1893. Her father, Joaquín de Mendizábal y Tamborrel, was an engineer and she was inspired by his career. She had a primary education between 1913 and 1917 and then entered a normal school for teachers. She also pursued additional courses in mathematics.

== Education and career ==
Mendizábal started taking engineering classes at the Escuela Nacional de Ingenieros in the Palacio de Minería in 1921. At first, she audited the classes, but eventually her normal school courses were considered equivalent to the bachelor's degree she required to be fully enrolled. While she was in school, her father became ill and eventually died in 1926. Nevertheless, she came back to school and achieved high grades in all her classes.

She graduated in 1927 and in January 1930, applied to take the professional exam for engineers. Her thesis was unusual in being illustrated with photographs. When she passed the exam on February 11, 1930, she became the first woman in Mexico to earn a civil engineering degree.

Mendizábal went on to work with the Sociedad Científica Antonio Alzate (Antonio Alzate Scientific Society), which her father had helped create.

== Legacy ==
She was honored with the Ruth Rivera award in 1974. Mendizábal died on November 23, 1985.
