= Maximiliano Cortázar =

Mexican politician

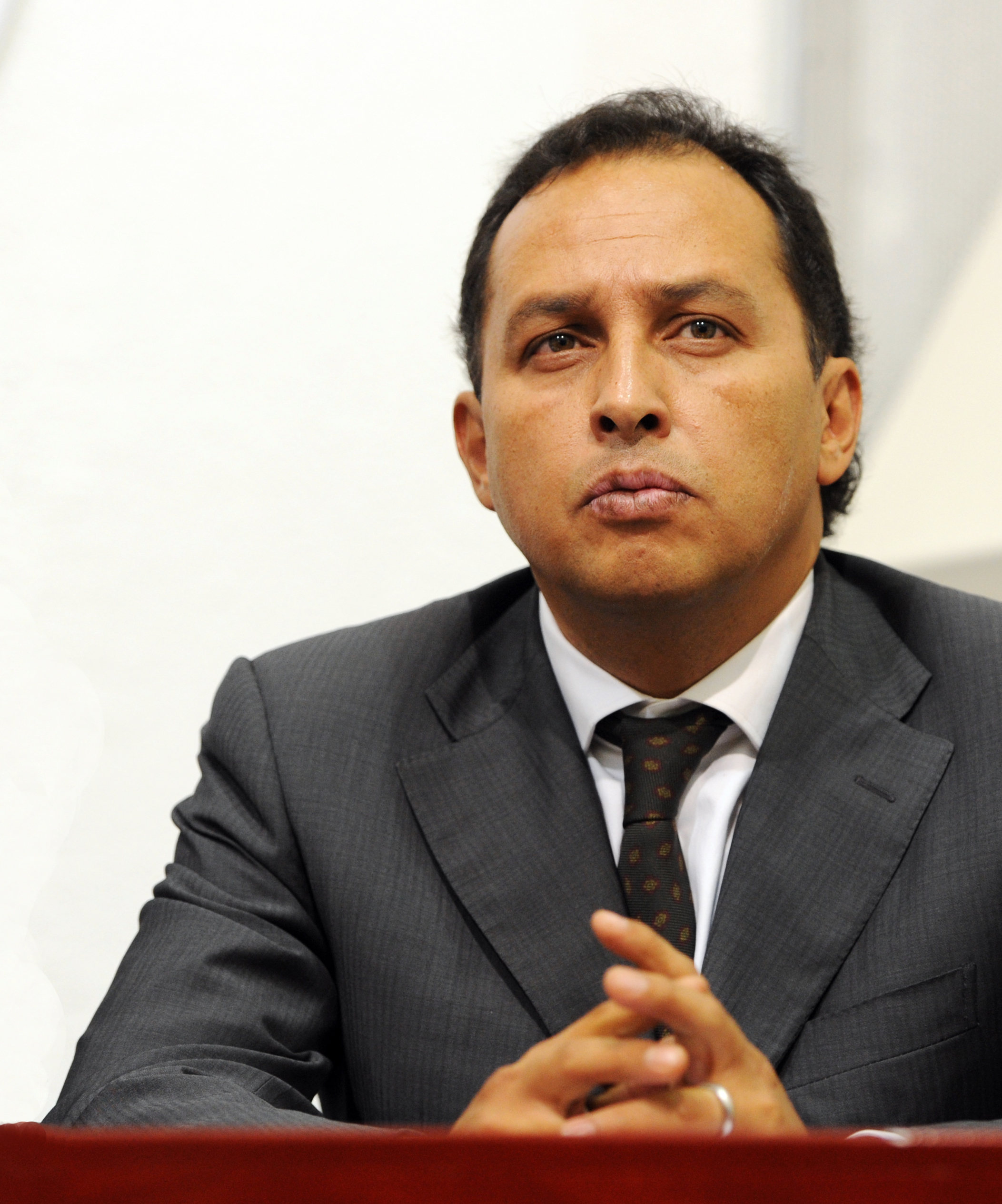
- Born: Gerardo Maximiliano Cortázar Lara; 2 November 1966 (age 59); Cuauhtémoc, D.F., Mexico
- Occupation: Deputy
- Political party: PAN

Gerardo Maximiliano Cortázar Lara (born 2 November 1966) is a Mexican politician affiliated with the PAN. As of 2013 he has served as Deputy of the LXII Legislature of the Mexican Congress representing the Federal District. He also has served as Media Secretary of the PAN during Vicente Fox's government.
