= Antonio Nieto =

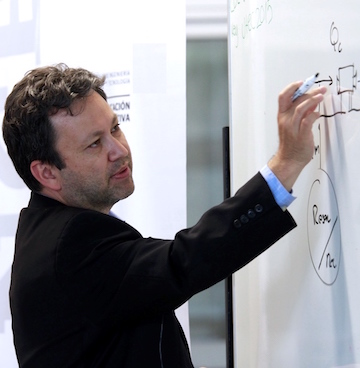
Nieto Teaching PSU 2015 copy

Antonio Nieto (born September 1967) is an Earth Systems and Mining engineer.

== Career ==
Prof. Dr. Nieto is a former Director of the FLSmidth Mining and Minerals Technology and Research Center located in Salt Lake City, USA. Earlier, Dr. Nieto served as Professor and JCI Chair in Minerals Resources and Reserves at The School of Mining Engineering at the University of the Witwatersrand, Johannesburg and as Associate Professor at Penn State, teaching courses on mining engineering, earth systems, economics engineering, computing modeling, sampling methods, and geostatistics. Prior to his academic and research career Nieto worked as a mining engineer in underground mining and surface mining.

Nieto graduated as mining engineer from Guanajuato School of Mines in 1990. He holds a master's degree (1997) in Geostatistics from Ecole Des Mines de Paris (Paris Tech), and a MS (1995) and PhD (2002) in Earth-Systems Engineering from Colorado School of Mines. He was nominated in 2017 as member of the Mexico's National Academy of Engineering.

Nieto specializes in ore resource and reserve estimation and mining operations optimization. Dr. Nieto is often interviewed by news networks and weekly news magazines such as Newsweek on strategic minerals, mine safety, and technology topics.

Nieto has published more than 80 technical papers.

== See also ==
- School of Mines
- Antonio Nieto
