= José Antonio Garrido Nataren =

Mexican engineer (born 1952)

Dr. José Antonio Garrido Natarén
- Born: June 13, 1952 (age 74); Cosoleacaque, Veracruz
- Education: Instituto Tecnológico de Veracruz
- Occupations: Industrial engineer in Mechanic, Director of the Technological University of Tecamachalco, Education

José Antonio Garrido Nataren is a Mexican engineer, currently serves as Rector of the University of Technology Tecamachalco

== Studies ==
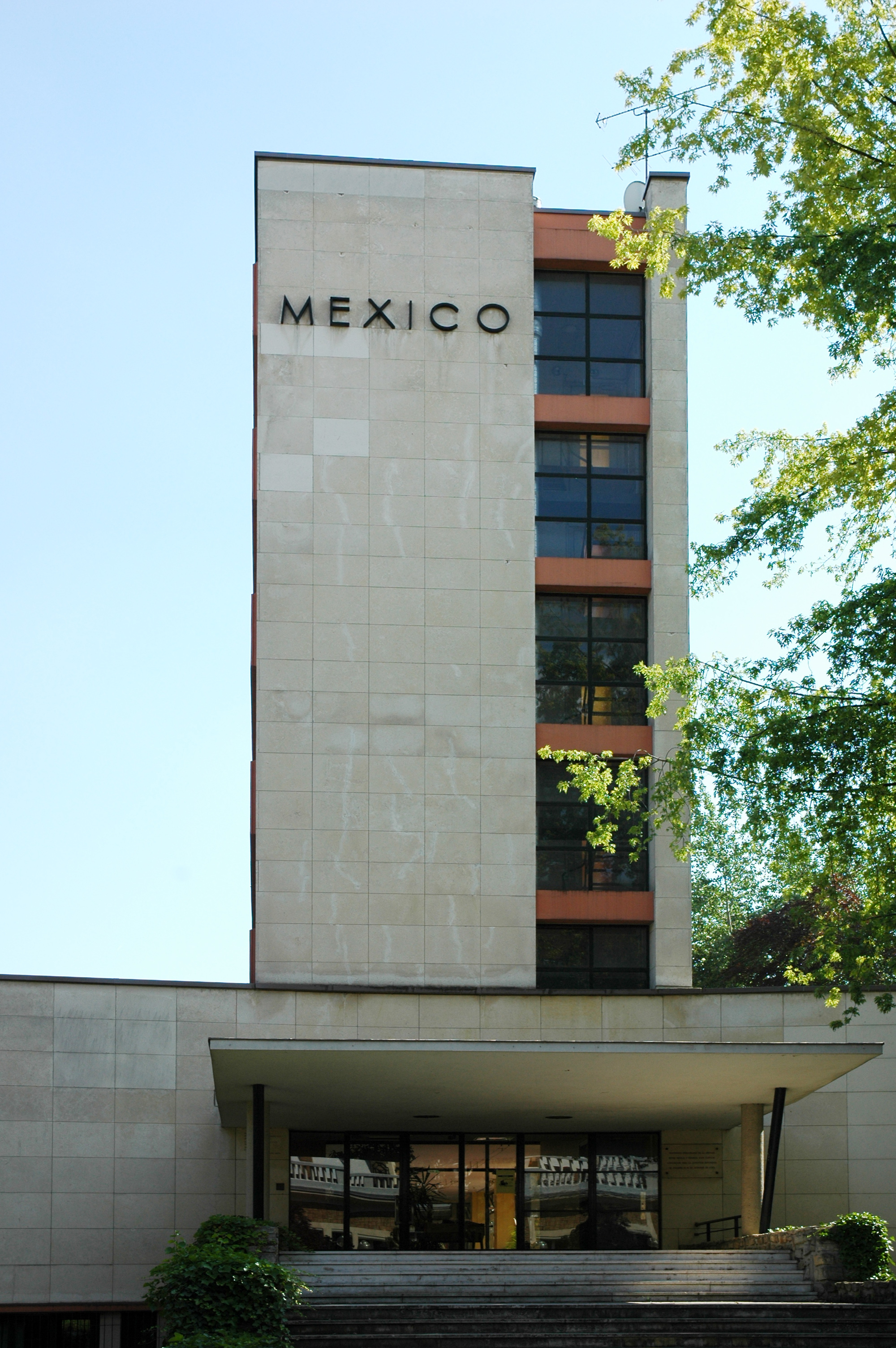
borde

From a very young excelled in academia, attending high school in Escuela Secundaria y de Bachilleres de Minatitlan ESBOM, where he excelled as an excellent student. Later technological forged identity studying engineering degree in Mechanics at the Instituto Tecnológico de Veracruz (http://www.itver.edu.mx). He completed the Ph.D. in Applied Computer Science by the École nationale supérieure de techniques avancées ENSTA www.ensta.fr with the thesis "A Modeleur géométrique MGIT Tridimensionnel Interactif" in June 1981. During his years as a doctoral student in France, he resided in the International City University of Paris in the house of Mexico, home of Lebanon and the Hellenic Foundation.

== Teaching ==
As a teacher, since 1981 full professor at the Instituto Tecnológico de Veracruz. It has also been a visiting professor at the École nationale des ponts et chaussées ENPC (http://www.enpc.fr) and lecturer on issues of Computer Aided Design CAD, industrial creativity, business incubators and launch of business (start-up) in universities, higher education institutions and colleges of engineering in Mexico and France.

== Academic positions ==
In the Secretary of Public Education SEP, he was director of the Instituto Tecnológico de Pachuca ITP http://www.itpachuca . edu.mx) and the Instituto Tecnológico de Veracruz and Assistant Director of Graduate and Research Directorate General of Technology DGEST www.dgest.gob.mx.

== Publications ==
- Founding Editor of the journal "Gestión Tecnológica" disseminator of science and technology of the Directorate General of Technology, 1987.
- Founding Editor of the magazine "Factor Tecnológico", organ of diffusion of science and technology of the Instituto Tecnológico de Pachuca Hidalgo, 1984.
- Doctoral Thesis "MGIT A géométrique Modeleur Tridimensionnel Interactif", June 1981.
- Publication "Interactive Construction of Volumes" Days of Production ADEPA June 1981. Toulouse, France.
- Study "Identification Process Model for Method. " Company ADERSE / Gerbi. Velizay-Villacoublay, France. Study Group on Bio-Systems. June 1979.
- Thesis of Engineering Economic Decisions and Administrative Changes to Operating Level of a company. "Instituto Tecnológico de Veracruz, 1977.
