= Eduardo Chávez (politician) =

Mexican engineer and politician

Eduardo Chávez Ramírez (16 May 1898–28 May 1982) was a Mexican engineer, and secretary of hydraulic resources from 1952 to 1958. He was in charge of doing the rivers of the north of Tamaulipas, Mexico. He was contracted by the president of Mexico (Lazaro Cardenas) in those years to do it.
