= Estanislao Tovilla Cortázar =

Estanisalao Tovilla-Cortazar (1936–1994) was a Mexican Civil Engineer born on February 10, 1936, in Mexico City, Mexico. He died in Veracruz, Mexico on March 8, 1994. He is most remembered for his research and development contributions in pier and pile foundations and soil mechanics. Tovilla-Cortazar's engineering work included the development of new foundation techniques at port sites and large industrial construction sites such as the Veracruz Port and the Steel Company Las Truchas (SICARTSA) in Lazaro Cardenas, Michoacán, Mexico and in SIDOR, Puerto Ordaz, Venezuela. He also developed contract closure procedures and audit for large construction contracts.

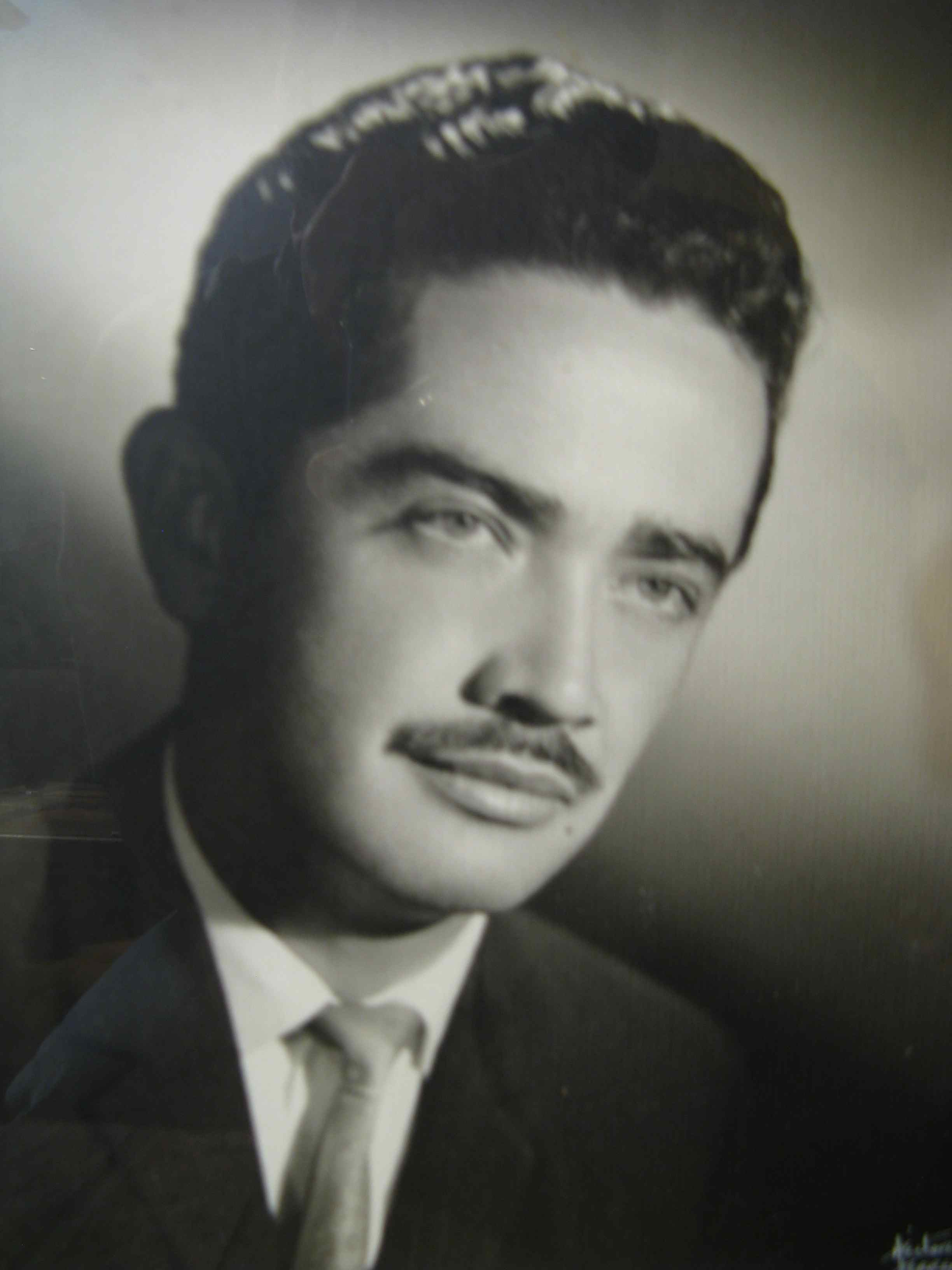
Estanialso Tovilla Cortazar, 1969

== Education ==
Tovilla-Cortazar's education began in the City of Cuernavaca, Morelos in Mexico. At the age of 15, he moved to Mexico City, where he attended the prestigious Centro Universitario Mexico (CUM). Upon high school graduation he studied Civil Engineering at the National University of Mexico (UNAM) specializing in soil mechanics and foundations, where he graduated in 1969. Tovilla-Cortazar's class, UNAM 1954 inaugurated the Ciudad Universitaria campus in Mexico City.

== Pier and Pile Foundations Research and Development ==
In 1960 Tovilla-Cortazar founded a private company specializing in pile foundations in Mexico City. By 1970, his company had built deep foundations in the complicated clay soils of Mexico City. Tovilla-Cortazar was hired by the Veracruz Port Authority to build and rehabilitate the pile foundations for the Port. This work was nationally recognized.

In 1972 he was hired to test deep foundations for the construction of the Steel Company Las Truchas, a Federal de-regulated agency located on the Pacific coast. The paper "New Reaction System for Mounting Static Load Test in Piers and Piles", was published by Deep Foundations Journal. After the success of the pile test, he was retained by SICARTSA as General Manager for Construction of the steel company.

In 1976, Tovilla-Cortazar founded a consulting firm specialized in the construction of steel manufacturing facilities. This firm was the first of its kind in Mexico, with more than 100 associates, all Mexican nationals who brought the expertise gained in SICARTSA. In 1977 the government of Venezuela retained the firm to provide consulting services during the construction of SIDOR, the steel company located in Puerto Ordaz, Venezuela. Having successfully completed the work in Venezuela, Tovilla-Cortazar and many of his Mexican associates moved back to Mexico, where they joined SICARTSA again for the construction of Phase II Project. The SICARTSA Phase II Project was concluded in 1992. After that the SICARTSA was sold to the private sector.
