= List of Mexican writers =

This is a list of Mexican writers.

- Isabel Fraire Guggenheim Fellowship; Xavier Villaurrutia Award;
- Celso Aguirre Bernal
- José Agustín Guggenheim Fellowship;
- Carmen Alardín Xavier Villaurrutia Award;
- Elizabeth Algrávez poet
- Araceli Ardón Rosario Castellanos Prize;
- Alejandro Ariceaga
- Homero Aridjis Neustadt Prize Candidate; Xavier Villaurrutia Award; Guggenheim Fellowship;Roger Caillois Prize; Grinzane Cavour Prize; Smederevo Golden Key;
- Juan José Arreola Juan Rulfo Prize; National Prize; Xavier Villaurrutia Award; Alfonso Reyes Prize
- Francisco Azuela Order of the Liberator of Central-America
- Mario Bellatin Xavier Villaurrutia Award; Guggenheim Fellowship
- Rubén Bonifaz Nuño Alfonso Reyes Prize; Guggenheim Fellowship;
- Carmen Boullosa Xavier Villaurrutia Award; Guggenheim Fellowship
- Coral Bracho Xavier Villaurrutia Award; Guggenheim Fellowship;
- Federico Campbell Guggenheim Fellowship;
- Marco Antonio Campos Xavier Villaurrutia Award;
- Julieta Campos Xavier Villaurrutia Award;
- Gabriel Careaga Medina sociologist
- Rosario Castellanos Xavier Villaurrutia Award
- Ali Chumacero National Prize; Xavier Villaurrutia Award; Alfonso Reyes Prize;
- Ana Clavel Juan Rulfo Prize; Elena Poniatowska Ibero-American Novel Prize
- Bárbara Colio, playwright and theater director, Maria Teresa Leon International Prize
- Rosina Conde ~~Gilberto Owen Award~~
- Amparo Dávila Xavier Villaurrutia Award;
- Guadalupe Dueñas José María Vigil Award;
- Ernesto de la Peña Xavier Villaurrutia Award;
- Fernando del Paso Romulo Gallegos Prize; Xavier Villaurrutia Award; Guggenheim Fellowship;
- Salvador Elizondo Xavier Villaurrutia Award; Guggenheim Fellowship;
- Malva Flores Aguascalientes Prize;
- Carlos Fuentes Cervantes Prize; Prince of Asturias Award; Romulo Gallegos Prize; Xavier Villaurrutia Award; Alfonso Reyes Prize; Neustadt Prize Candidate; Menendez y Pelayo Prize
- Sergio Galindo Xavier Villaurrutia Award;
- Juan García Ponce Juan Rulfo Prize; Xavier Villaurrutia Award; Guggenheim Fellowship
- Emilio García Riera Xavier Villaurrutia Award;
- Jesús Gardea Xavier Villaurrutia Award;
- Ángel María Garibay National Prize;
- Elena Garro Sor Juana Inés de la Cruz Prize; Xavier Villaurrutia Award;
- Margo Glantz National Prize; Sor Juana Inés de la Cruz Prize; Xavier Villaurrutia Award; Guggenheim Fellowship;
- Enrique González Rojo Xavier Villaurrutia Award;
- José Gordon journalist
- Hugo Gutiérrez Vega Xavier Villaurrutia Award;
- Martín Luis Guzmán National Prize;
- Andrés Henestrosa Alfonso Reyes Prize;
- Deborah Holtz journalist
- David Huerta Xavier Villaurrutia Award;
- Mónica Lavín, Gilberto Owen Premio National Award for Literature, Narrativa de Colima Award, the Elena Poniatowska Iberoamerican Novel Award
- Vicente Leñero National Prize; Xavier Villaurrutia Award; Guggenheim Fellowship
- Rossy Evelin Lima Gabriela Mistral Award;
- Eduardo Lizalde Xavier Villaurrutia Award; Guggenheim Fellowship
- Luis Felipe Lomeli San Luis Potosi Prize;
- Pura López Colomé Alfonso Reyes National Essay Award, National Poetry Translation Prize, Xavier Villaurrutia Prize
- Ramón López Velarde, no prizes known
- Gregorio Lopez y Fuentes National Prize;
- María Luisa Puga Xavier Villaurrutia Award;
- José Manuel Prieto Guggenheim Fellowship;
- Carlos Martin Briceño
- José Luis Martínez Alfonso Reyes Prize; Menendez y Pelayo Prize;
- Ángeles Mastretta Romulo Gallegos Prize;
- Ernesto Mejía Sánchez Alfonso Reyes Prize;
- Ernesto Mejía Sánchez Xavier Villaurrutia Award;
- Eugenio Méndez Docurro
- Silvia Molina Sor Juana Inés de la Cruz Prize; Xavier Villaurrutia Award
- Carlos Monsiváis Juan Rulfo Prize; National Prize; Xavier Villaurrutia Award
- Carlos Montemayor Xavier Villaurrutia Award
- Marco Antonio Montes de Oca Xavier Villaurrutia Award; Guggenheim Fellowship;
- Myriam Moscona Guggenheim Fellowship; Xavier Villaurrutia Award
- Angelina Muñiz-Huberman Sor Juana Inés de la Cruz Prize;
- Guadalupe Nettel Herralde Prize;
- Rosa Nissán Ariel León Dultzin Award
- Tony Olmos screenwriter
- José Emilio Pacheco Octavio Paz Prize; Xavier Villaurrutia Award; Garcia Lorca Prize; Alfonso Reyes Prize;
- Ignacio Padilla Guggenheim Fellowship;
- Octavio Paz Nobel Prize; Cervantes Prize; Neustadt Prize; National Prize; Alfonso Reyes Prize; Jerusalem Prize; Menendez y Pelayo Prize; Doctor Honoris Causa (Harvard); Xavier Villaurrutia Award
- Carlos Pellicer Cámara National Prize
- Sergio Pitol Cervantes Prize; National Prize; Herralde Prize; Juan Rulfo Prize; Guggenheim Fellowship; Xavier Villaurrutia Award
- Elena Poniatowska National Prize; Xavier Villaurrutia Award; Romulo Gallegos Prize; Guggenheim Fellowship;
- Félix Ramos y Duarte (1848–1924), Cuban-born educator, textbook writer, lexicographer, compiled the first dictionary of Mexican Spanish
- Roberto Ransom (born 1960), Irish Mexican novelist and short story writer
- José Revueltas Xavier Villaurrutia Award;
- Alfonso Reyes National Prize;
- Vicente Riva Palacio
- Margarita Peña
- Eduardo Ramos-Izquierdo
- Cristina Rivera Garza Sor Juana Inés de la Cruz Prize;
- Max Rojas Carlos Pellicer Iberoamerican Prize in Poetry
- Alejandro Rossi Xavier Villaurrutia Award; Guggenheim Fellowship;
- Juan Rulfo National Prize; Prince of Asturias Award; Xavier Villaurrutia Award;
- Alberto Ruy Sánchez Xavier Villaurrutia Award; Guggenheim Fellowship;
- Rafael Saavedra
- Jaime Sabines National Prize; Xavier Villaurrutia Award;
- Daniel Sada Xavier Villaurrutia Award;
- Gustavo Sainz Xavier Villaurrutia Award;
- Adolfo Sánchez Vázquez National Prize 2002
- Guillermo Schmidhuber de la Mora Dramaturgo y crítico, author de cuarenta obra de teatro y cien libros
- Tomás Segovia Juan Rulfo Prize; Octavio Paz Prize; Xavier Villaurrutia Award;
- Esther Seligson Xavier Villaurrutia Award;
- Ignacio Solares Xavier Villaurrutia Award; Guggenheim Fellowship;
- Martín Solares Efraín Huerta National Literary Award (1998)
- Daniela Tarazona Sor Juana Inés de la Cruz Prize;
- Reies Tijerina
- Jaime Torres Bodet National Prize;
- Julio Torri
- Xavier Velasco Alfaguara International Prize
- Gustavo Vázquez-Lozano Sor Juana Inés de la Cruz Award; Ignacio Solares Award
- Alberto Chimal
- Josefina Vicens Xavier Villaurrutia Award;
- Maruxa Vilalta, National Prize 2010
- Juan Villoro Herralde Prize; Xavier Villaurrutia Award
- Jorge Volpi Guggenheim Fellowship;
- Ramón Xirau Alfonso Reyes Prize; Guggenheim Fellowship;
- Gabriel Zaid Xavier Villaurrutia Award;
- Luis Zapata
- Eraclio Zepeda Xavier Villaurrutia Award;

== See also ==
- Mexican literature
- List of Mexican women writers
- List of Latin American writers
