= José Fuentes Mares National Prize for Literature =

Mexican literary award

José Fuentes Mares National Prize for Literature (Spanish: Premio Nacional de Literatura José Fuentes Mares or simply Premio José Fuentes Mares) is a Mexican literary award that has been presented annually since 1985 by the Universidad Autónoma de Ciudad Juárez. It is given to a Mexican author who has published a book in the form of short stories, poems or a novel. The award is named in honor of José Fuentes Mares.

The first recipient was the writer Jesús Gardea, who declined the prize. Some well-known authors who have won it include Daniel Sada, Carlos Montemayor, Jaime Labastida, Alberto Ruy Sánchez, Juan Villoro, José Emilio Pacheco and Hernan Lara Zavala.

== Winners ==
Sources for 1986–2011:

- 1986 Jesús Gardea (rejected by Gardea)
- 1987 Jaime Labastida and Sergio Galindo
- 1988 Eugenio Aguirre
- 1989 Alberto Blanco, Song to the Shadow of the Animals
- 1990 Carlos Montemayor
- 1991 Alberto Ruy Sánchez, Una introducción a Octavio Paz
- 1992 Bruno Estañol
- 1993 Javier Sicilia, El Bautista
- 1994 Julio Eutiquio Sarabia
- 1995 Hernán Lara Zavala
- 1996 Ignacio Solares
- 1997 Angelina Muñiz–Hubermann
- 1998 Héctor Manjarrez
- 1999 Daniel Sada
- 2000 José Emilio Pacheco, La arena errante
- 2001 Mario González Suárez, El libro de las pasiones
- 2002 Élmer Mendoza, El amante de Janis Joplin
- 2003 Enrique Servín, El agua y la sombra
- 2004 Enrique Mijares, Espinazo del diablo
- 2005 David Toscana, El último lector
- 2006 Federico Patán, Encuentros
- 2007 Norma Lazo, El dolor es un triángulo equilátero
- 2008 Tedi López Mills, Contracorriente
- 2009 Edgar Chías Orozco, De insomnio y medianoche
- 2009 Edeberto Galindo Noriega, Río ánimas
- 2010 Ricardo García Mainou, Cuando te toca
- 2011 Mauricio Carrera, La derrota de los días
- 2012
- 2013
- 2014 Eduardo Antonio Parra, Desterrados
- 2015 Imanol Caneyada, Hotel de Arraigo
- 2016 Antonio Zúñiga. Juárez Jerusalem and Mi papá no es santo ni enmascarado de teatro and Matatena
