= Montemayor (surname) =

Montemayor is a surname. Notable persons with that name include:

- Carlos Montemayor (1947–2010), Mexican novelist, poet, essayist, literary critic, tenor, and political analyst
- Diego de Montemayor (1530–1610), Spanish conquistador, explorer, officer, and politician
- Felipe Montemayor (1928–2025), Mexican baseball player
- Jorge de Montemayor (c. 1520 – 1561), Portuguese novelist and poet
- Jose Montemayor Jr. (born 1962), Filipino lawyer and doctor and a candidate for the 2022 Philippine presidential election
- Myriam Montemayor Cruz (born 1981), Mexican singer

== Fictional characters ==
- Leandro Montemayor, president of the Philippines in the Philippine television series Kung Mawawala Ka
