= Fahrenheit (magazine) =

FAHRENHEITº
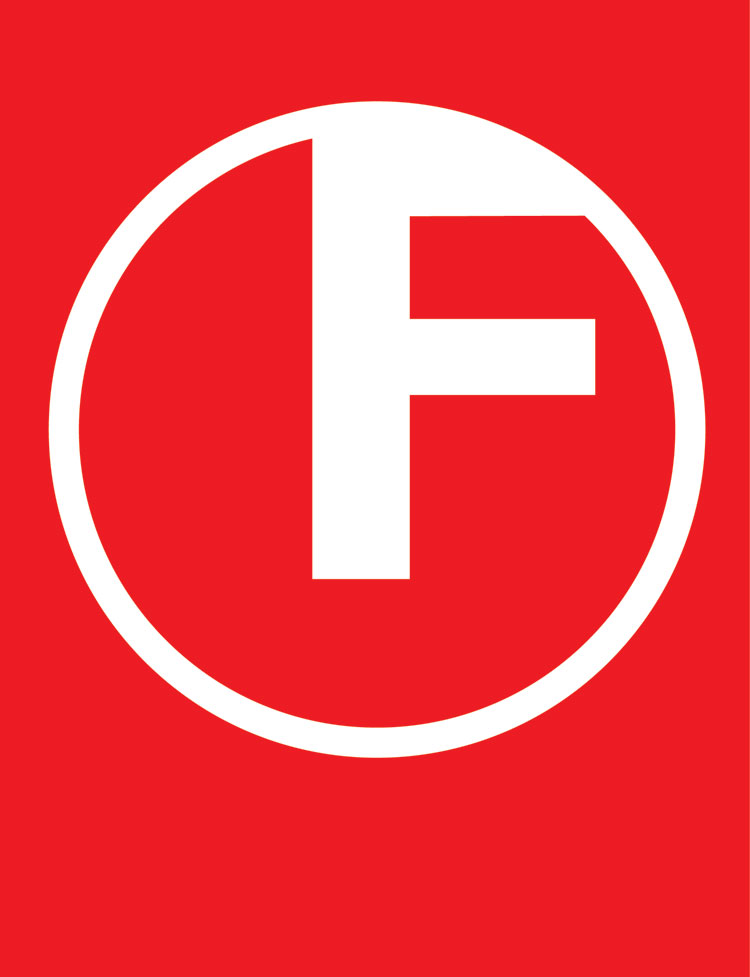
- Editorial Director: Rubén José Marshall Tikalova (Editorial Director)
- Categories: Contemporary art and lifestyle
- Frequency: Bimonthly
- Publisher: CA Proyeccion SA de CV
- First issue: 2003
- Country: Mexico
- Based in: Mexico City
- Language: Spanish (print), Spanish, English and French online
- Website: www.fahrenheitmagazine.com

FAHRENHEITº is a bimonthly magazine of contemporary art and lifestyle that addresses themes from different disciplines of art, criticism and theory. It was founded in 2003 in Mexico City by Rubén José Marshall Tikalova. Its website was launched in 2009; there can be found news from contemporary art and culture, in Spanish, English, and French. The magazine is intended for a range of audiences. Both media and readers have found in FAHRENHEITº a means of staying in contact with the art world. The magazine has received coverage since 2003 in the press, magazines and catalogues, and in a research thesis.

== Content ==
The magazine contains articles, artists presentations, manifestations and movements, along with issues related to lifestyle, all of them divided into four sections:

- Intro: Introduces the reader to the theme of the edition along with recognized writers who manage it through three articles: Thesis, Antithesis and Synthesis.
- Art: Develops the theme of the magazine from the perspective of different forms of art and culture: visual arts, film, performing arts, music, literature, architecture. Featuring the work of artist, writers or curators through the articles: Paper Museum, Portfolio, Laboratory, From Exile (with the kind support of Casa Refugio Citlaltépetl, Mexico – whose main objective is to host writers, who are prosecuted or threatened in their original countries); and articles and interviews that examine the owe of arts professionals: Profile, Film (by Cineteca Nacional] (National Film Archives, Mexico), Sound, Web Art and Architecture.
- Gallery: Analyzes recent exhibitions, events of interest and the art market through the articles: Gallery, Special Coverages, Art Market (by Sotheby's New York).
- Contemporary: Finishes the issue of the magazine with articles on lifestyle: Fashion, Design, Latitude (travels), Guide of Events from Mexico and worldwide, Haute Cuisine and Wines. The magazine concludes with a space dedicated to readers, who are invited to share a photo so that other readers can know them.

== Collaborators ==
The magazine's collaborators have included José Gordon, Mónica Lavín, Nicolás Alvarado, Luigi Amara, Marc Sagaert, Julio Patán, Roberto Pliego, Cineteca Nacional Mexico, and Sotheby's New York.

== Website ==
The site is a channel of news of art and lifestyle both Mexican and international, it presents new daily information in its different sections. It was launched in 2009, and since then it has been exponentially growing, with presence in social networks.

== Achievements ==
From the beginning, FAHRENHEITº has been involved with art and culture life in Mexico, both as media, and as partner in platforms that support young artists. Its main objective is to be an agent in the development, promotion and growing of art and culture. The support of French Embassy in Mexico has been fundamental during the life of the magazine, the magazine has also maintained a close relation to the Alliance Française Mexique. FAHRENHEITº also had the privilege to participate as partner in the bi-national contest, Miradas Cruzadas (Regards Croisés) with other institutions from government and private sector, and the winners of this contest experimented the cultural exchange through the photography.
