= Jesús Gardea =

Mexican writer (1939-2000)

Jesús Gardea Rocha (July 2, 1939 – March 12, 2000) was a Mexican writer of fiction and short fiction.

== Biography ==
Jesús Gardea Rocha was born on July 2, 1939, in Delicias, Chihuahua, Mexico, to Vicente Gardea V. and Francisca Rocha. He studied at the Elementary School No. 306 in Delicias, and later went to study his secondary studies at Benjamin N. Velasco school in Querétaro and its high school in Mexico City. He studied Odontology at the Autonomous University of Guadalajara, and later established in Ciudad Juárez where he carried out such professional activity. Jesús Gardea was discovered as a writer by poet Jaime Labastida. During the Writer's Meeting in Ciudad Juárez, Labastida pushed him to publish Los viernes de Lautaro in Siglo XXI publishing house in 1979. Six months later, in 1980, he signed a contract with Joaquín Mortiz, another publishing house, to publish a book of short stories entitled Septiembre y los otros días, which was awarded with the Xavier Villaurrutia Award, thus becoming the second Chihuahuan to win such award. In 1985, he won the José Fuentes Mares National Prize for Literature given by the Autonomous University of Ciudad Juárez on its inaugural edition, which he rejected.

He was faculty professor of the Faculty of Political and Social Sciences at the Autonomous University of Ciudad Juárez. He participated twice in the "Chihuahuan Writers Gatherings" organized since 1982 by Mario Arras, who proposed him as a candidate to receive the "Tomás Valles Vivar" Award in the subject of literature on its first edition, but lost to philosopher Federico Ferro Gay.

Gardea belongs to the group of Chihuahuan artists born during the 1940s decade, made up of writers such as Victor Hugo Rascón Banda, Ignacio Solares, Joaquín Armando Chacón, José Vicente Anaya and Carlos Montemayor, and sculptor Sebastián. Most of these prolific artists moved to Mexico City looking forward to gaining recognition and money; however, Gardea remained firm on his desire to live in his birth state.

== Style ==
Jesus Gardea, northern Mexico's most influential author, is a writer of the llanos—the parched flatlands of northern Mexico—and the eerie stillness of this landscape infuses the twenty-five stories in this major retrospective of his work. Gardea's is a world of wind and sun, scorching summers and frigid winters, small towns and lonely houses, empty horizons. It is a harsh, violent world, in which solitary individuals struggle against unforgiving elements and human violence.

Occasionally strong bonds form, only to be severed. In one story, two men get together to look at geography magazines and debate the grandeur of things they have never seen. One fancies the immensity of the sea. "There are many kinds of immensity", the other replies, dreaming of forests, which, for him, become an enchantment. He travels to the United States, sends his friend a letter: "Today I bought a pistols and some bullets.... I shouldn't die anywhere but in the forest". From Gardea's claustrophobic landscape, as from life itself, escape may come only through death.

Gardea's characters live in an existential world in which the cruelties of chance are the condition of life. Often pursuing absurd activities—moving an unclaimed dresser in a rowboat, clearing a patch of land that nobody wants—they could take as their motto Beckett's "I can't go on, I'll go on". But Gardea's taut tales gain strength and power from the unique world in which they are set, the austere world of Mexico's northern plains.

== Works ==
=== Short story ===
- Los viernes de Lautaro (1979)
- Septiembre y los otros días (1980), Xavier Villarrutia Award
- De alba sombría (1985)
- The Lights of the World (Las luces del mundo, 1986)
- Difícil de atrapar (1995)
- Stripping away the sorrows from this world (1998), selection of stories and translation by Mark Schafer: Trinitario, Above the water, Man alone, From Alba, The irrigation ditch, The lights of the world, This very afternoon, Nazaria, All the years of snow, Forty springs, Pale as dust—Remember the silence—According to Evaristo—The aquarium—No loss—Garita, death itself—The bureau—The friends—The dog—like the world, Bridge of shadows, The forest gates, Latitudes of Habacuc, Everyone, The guitar.
- Donde el gimnasta (1999)

=== Novel ===
- El sol que estas mirando (1981)
- La canción de las mulas muertas (1981)
- El tornavoz (1983)
- Soñar la guerra (1984)
- Los músicos y el fuego (1985)
- Sóbol (1985)
- El diablo en el ojo (1989)
- El agua de las esferas (1992)
- La ventana hundida (1992)
- Juegan los comensales (1998)
- El biombo y los frutos (2001)

=== Poetry ===
- Songs for a Single Cord (Canciones para una sola cuerda, 1982), translation by Robert L. Giron.
