= Familia (2023 film) =

- Netflix release poster
- Directed by: Rodrigo García
- Written by: Rodrigo García; Bárbara Colio
- Produced by: Pablo Zimbrón Alva; Gerardo Gatica González
- Starring: Daniel Giménez Cacho; Ilse Salas; Cassandra Ciangherotti; Natalia Solián; Ángeles Cruz; Maribel Verdú
- Cinematography: Igor Jadue-Lillo
- Edited by: Yibrán Asuad
- Music by: Marco Carrión; Camilo Lara
- Production company: Panorama Global
- Distributed by: Netflix
- Release dates: December 7, 2023 (Mexico); December 15, 2023 (Netflix)
- Running time: 104 minutes
- Country: Mexico
- Language: Spanish

Familia (lit. 'Family', stylized as Familia.) is a 2023 Mexican drama film directed by Rodrigo García and written by García and Bárbara Colio. Starring Daniel Giménez Cacho, Ilse Salas, Cassandra Ciangherotti, Natalia Solián, Ángeles Cruz and Maribel Verdú. It is about the consequences in the family environment after the father decides to sell the olive ranch where everyone lived warm memories.

== Synopsis ==
Leo is the owner of an olive ranch located in the Valle de Guadalupe and the father of four children: Rebeca, Julia, Mariana and Benny. Every month he brings his family together to catch up on their lives, but this time things will be different, because during the meal, Leo will reveal that he has received an offer to sell the ranch, the place where they grew up and where the memories of their dead mother. The news will divide the opinion of the members and stir different emotions in them.

== Cast ==
The actors participating in this film are:

- Daniel Giménez Cacho as Leo
- Ilse Salas as Rebeca
- Cassandra Ciangherotti as Julia
- Natalia Solián as Mariana
- Ángeles Cruz as Teresa
- Maribel Verdú as Clara
- Ricardo Selmen as Benny
- Vicky Araico as Araceli
- Brian Shortall as Dan
- Isabella Gallegos Arroyo as Amanda
- Andrea Sutton as Erika
- Zury Jacobo Shasho as Alan
- Natalia Plascencia as Mónica
- Adolfo Mendoza Madera as Otoniel
- Jessie Valcin as Eva
- Fernando Álvarez Rebeil as Tomás

== Production ==
Principal photography took place in Valle de Guadalupe in Ensenada Municipality, Mexico and wrapped on May 17, 2023.

== Release ==
It had a limited release on December 7, 2023, in Mexican theaters, then released worldwide on December 15, 2023, on Netflix.

== Accolades ==
Year	Award	Category	Recipient	Result	Ref.
2024	66th Ariel Awards	Best Director	Rodrigo García	Nominated	
2024	66th Ariel Awards	Best Actor	Daniel Giménez Cacho	Nominated	
2024	66th Ariel Awards	Best Actress	Cassandra Ciangherotti	Nominated	
2024	66th Ariel Awards	Best Actress	Ilse Salas	Nominated	
2024	66th Ariel Awards	Best Editing	Yibrán Asuad	Nominated	
2024	66th Ariel Awards	Best Costume Design	Mariestela Fernández	Nominated	
