= Deborah Holtz =

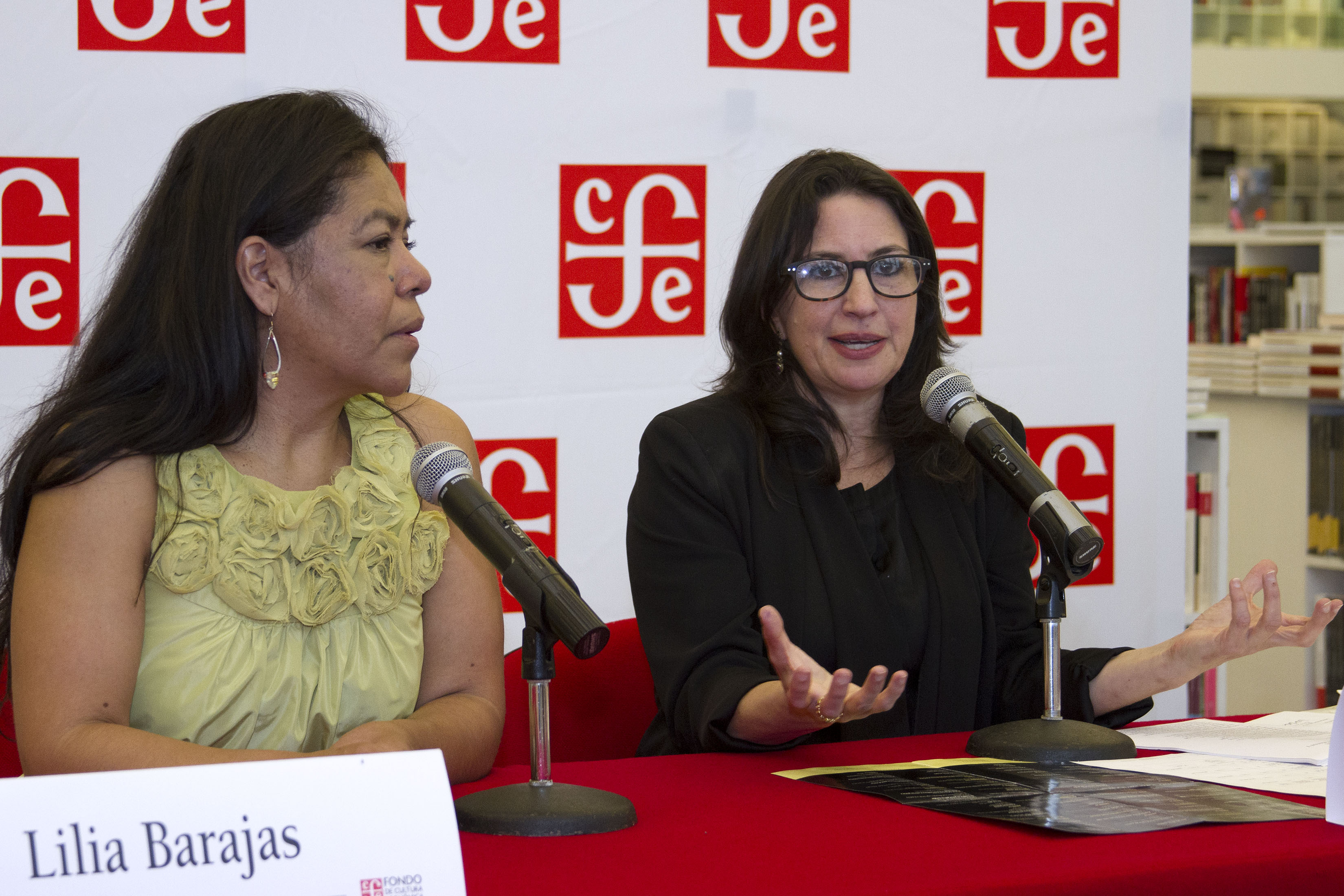
Holtz in 2015

Deborah Holtz (born January 18, 1960, México City) is a Mexican writer, editor, anchorwoman and the founder and director of the Asociación de Editoriales Mexicanas Independientes (AEMI) and Trilce Editorial. Most of her work as a writer is focused on the Mexican culture and arts. She worked as anchorwoman for TV Azteca and currently she is hosting a radio program called Salsajazzeando. She studied journalism and she has a master's degree in political science.

== Personal life ==
Holtz was born on January 18, 1960, in Mexico City. She was raised Jewish. attending the Colegio Hebreo Tarbut school as a child. When she was five years old she moved to Los Angeles CA, with her sister and her father. Her parents divorced, and she did not see her mother for 25 years. Holtz refers to her high school, the Escuela secundaria y Preparatoria de la Ciudad de Mexico, as her alma mater. At the age of 16, Holtz wanted to tell the story of her first job, which was at a retirement home with people who had been in the Holocaust and the mistreatment they had. That job was the first notion that she wanted to be a journalist. Then she went to the Universidad Iberoamericana, graduating as a journalist with a thesis about Ciudad Nezahualcoyotl. After that she studied a master's degree at the London School of Economics and Political Science on political science and her thesis was about Althusser. She founded Trilce Ediciones publishing house. In 2010 Holtz was victim of a robbery when she arrived to her house losing her laptop and her car in this incident.

== Tacopedia ==
Holtz's best-known work is her book Tacopedia. Published by Trilce Ediciones in 2012, it focuses on the Mexican folklore and traditions about tacos. It includes recipes, a map for taco styles all over Mexico, recipes for sauces, how to eat different types of tacos and interviews with taqueros from all over the country. It is known because it is the first book that combines scientific facts about tacos, how they shape Mexican culture and how they have been changing over time.

== Trilce Ediciones Publishing House ==
Holtz is the founder of Trilce Ediciones, a publisher with the aim of providing an avenue for publishing for independent writers. Most of the books published there, are about art, poetry and pop culture. Trilce Ediciones also edits magazines by request and special publications for Carlos Monsiváis and Guillermo Sheridan. Trilce Ediciones started in 1992 when Holtz returned to Mexico from London after finishing her master's degree. Some time after the foundation she included her friends. Ciro Gomez, Marcial Ortiz and Isabel Tardan to the project.

Trilce's first real entry to the world of serious editing, where the magazine called Pasajero, which is published by the Tres Estrellas bus company. Then Holtz associated with Juan Carlos Mena, a graphic designer, with the two publishing the book Sensacional de diseño mexicano in 2002. That book won the Communication Arts award in 2002.

=== Trilce Ediciones Collections ===
- Arte
- Tristán Lecoq
- El Encarguito
- Niños y Jovenes

== Other professional activities ==
=== Books ===
Most of Holtz's books are related to Mexican culture and arts made by Mexicans most of which are illustrated by making use of a large number of images. According to the newspaper Milenio, her books are intended to be a map of Mexico and a tourist guide. All of her books are edit and published by Trilce Ediciones.

- De todo corazón
- Pedro Friedeberg
- Tacopedia, The taco enciclopedia
- Imagenes de la tradicion viva
- Sensacional de diseño mexicano

=== Asociación de Editoriales Mexicanas Independientes ===
Hotlz is the founder and director of the Asociación Mexicana de Editoriales Independientes (AEMI), was founded in November 2004. The project focuses on promoting the habit of lecture and Mexican independent publishing houses. Holtz is responsible for creating and planning the Festival of independent books. AEMI Is formed by 70 different independent publishing houses, which are considered to be non profit and cynical. Now a day they are part of the International Alliance of Independent Editors.

=== Salsajazzeando ===
Holtz has been the anchorwomen of a program called Salsajazzeando since 2012, a radio show about Latin music in different stiles like Latin jazz, salsa, bugaloo and Caribbean rhythms. Salsajezzeando is broadcast every Saturday at 14:00 on the 107.9 FM (XHIMR) in Mexico City.
