= Rosa Beltrán =

Mexican writer, lecturer and academic (born 1960)

- Rosa María Beltrán Álvarez
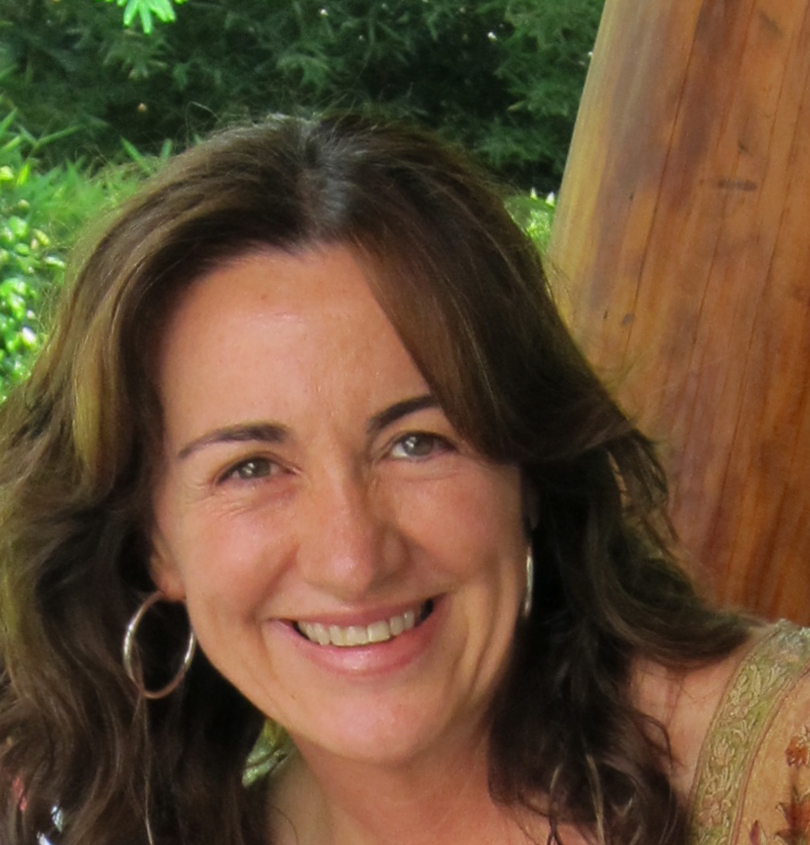
- Born: 15 March 1960 (age 66); Mexico City
- Education: National Autonomous University of Mexico, University of California, Los Angeles
- Occupations: Novelist and academic
- Writing career
- Language: English, Spanish
- Notable awards: Academia Mexicana de la Lengua

Rosa María Beltrán Álvarez (born Mexico City, 15 March 1960) is a Mexican novelist, short story writer, essayist, and translator. She was the deputy director of La Jornada Semanal from 1999 to 2002 and has been a member of the Sistema Nacional de Creadores from 1997 to 2000. She was the director of the Literature department at the UNAM and is currently the chair in Coordinación de Difusión Cultural at UNAM. On June 12, 2014, she was appointed as a member by the Academia Mexicana de la Lengua as the 36th Chair, becoming the tenth woman to hold this position.

== Biography ==
Beltrán, born in Mexico City in 1960, has a BA in the Hispanic Language and Literatures from the National Autonomous University of Mexico (UNAM) and a PhD in Comparative Literature from University of California, Los Angeles (UCLA). She was awarded with funding from FONCA in 1991, from CME in 1993, and from the Fulbright Program.

She has taught courses and seminars in Mexico and abroad and delivered keynote addresses at numerous associations and universities, including ACLA, UCLA, the Hebrew University of Jerusalem, the University of Colorado, Ramon Llull and others. She has coordinated and led graduate-level classes in Comparative Literature at the UNAM's Facultad de Filosofía y Letras, and she served as director of the Casa Universitario del Libro. Her articles on literature and culture have appeared in several magazines worldwide and she contributes to the Revista de la Universidad and to Laberinto, the cultural supplement of the newspaper Milenio. As part of her admission speech to the Academia Mexicana de la Lengua in 2014, she discussed the ongoing relevance of the novel Cartucho, by Nellie Campobello, and the author's astute reflections on the state of contemporary Mexico. In 2021, she was invited by the Instituto Nacional de Ciencias Médicas y Nutrición Salvador Zubirán to deliver the keynote address “Pandemia, arte y literatura” in commemoration of this institution's 75-year anniversary. Her essay, which chronicles the global quarantine and the experience of art over the first 18 months, will be published alongside other texts on the COVID-19 pandemic.

Beltrán's work has been translated into Slovenian, French, English, Italian, and Dutch; included in multiple national and international anthologies; and recognized by numerous associations, such as the American Association of University Woman for her work and contributions to literature written by women (1992). In 1997 she won the Florence Fishbaum Award for her essay collection América sin americanismos/Re-evaluating the Idea of the Americas: Utopic, Dystopic and Apocalyptic Paradigms. Other awards include the Premio Planeta–Joaquín Mortiz de Novela 1995 for La corte de los ilusos; Premio Jóvenes Académicos de la UNAM 1997 in the category of creative writing; Reconocimiento Sor Juana Inés de la Cruz from the UNAM; and, recently, the 2022 José Emilio Pacheco Award granted by the Universidad Autónoma de Yucatán (UADY) in conjunction with the FILEY and UC-Mexicanistas. Her books have been the subject of essays and theses, and all of her novels have been reissued, some more than once. She is the author of the novels La corte de los ilusos (Premio Planeta 1995), El paraíso que fuimos (2002), Alta infidelidad (2006), Efectos secundarios (2012), El cuerpo expuesto (2013), and Radicales libres (2020). She is also the author of the short story collections Amores que matan (1996) and Cuentos darwinianos (Universidad de Guadalajara 2020) and of the book-length essay Verdades virtuales (Debolsillo 2019). In collaboration with other authors, she wrote (chronichles on Acapulco, Alfaguara 2019), El nacimiento del monstruo (on Mary Shelley and Frankenstein, UNAM 2016), El cuerpo femenino y sus narrativas (UNAM 2016), and Jamás despejar las incógnitas (UNAM 2018). In 2021, the FCE published her chronicle Acuérdate de Acapulco in Cuadernos del Viento.

Her novel Radicales libres (Penguin Random House, 2021) sold out two months after its publication in 2021 and is forthcoming in an English translation by Robin Myers to be co-published by Hablemos, escritoras and Katakana Editores. Her Cuando las palabras no eran las cosas is forthcoming from Caminos de la Lectura. Cómo y por qué empezamos a leer (UNAM 2022). She is currently working on the essay collection La mujer del escritor (ten chronicles on the wives of classic novelists and their decisive contributions to their oeuvre). She coordinated the anthology Sólo cuento, volumes I to X, as well as Crónica y Ensayo, published by the Dirección de Literatura, UNAM.

She has published texts in specialized and popular magazines such as the Revista de la Universidad de México; Revista Claustro de Sor Juana; Nexos; Gatopardo; Proceso; Hispanofila, University of North Carolina at Chapel Hill; Revista Fundación Veracruzana; Revista: PMLA (My Modern Language Association); Casa de las Américas; Literal Latin American Voices; Revista Luvina; Revista Quién; and Revista ELLE, among others. Her interviews, critical articles, and reviews have appeared in La Jornada, el Universal, El País, La Provincia (Guadalajara), El Norte (Monterrey), Reforma, and Viceversa (New York), among others. Rosa Beltrán, Efectos literarios y el arte de narrar, ed. Oswaldo Estrada, Bonilla Artiga Editores, a book on her work is coming soon.

In March 2020, she launched her project Conver@as, a podcast on the literature and themes encompassed by pandemics and quarantines throughout history. As a cultural manager, she has organized series, literary festivals, and book fairs for over twelve years. In 2009, she started the festival Fiesta del Libro y la Rosa, which has been held continuously since its inauguration, including two virtual editions in 2020 and 2021 with the participation of authors from all over the world. From 2016 until the pandemic, she and Mónica Lavín co-directed the program “Contraseñas” on Canal 22.

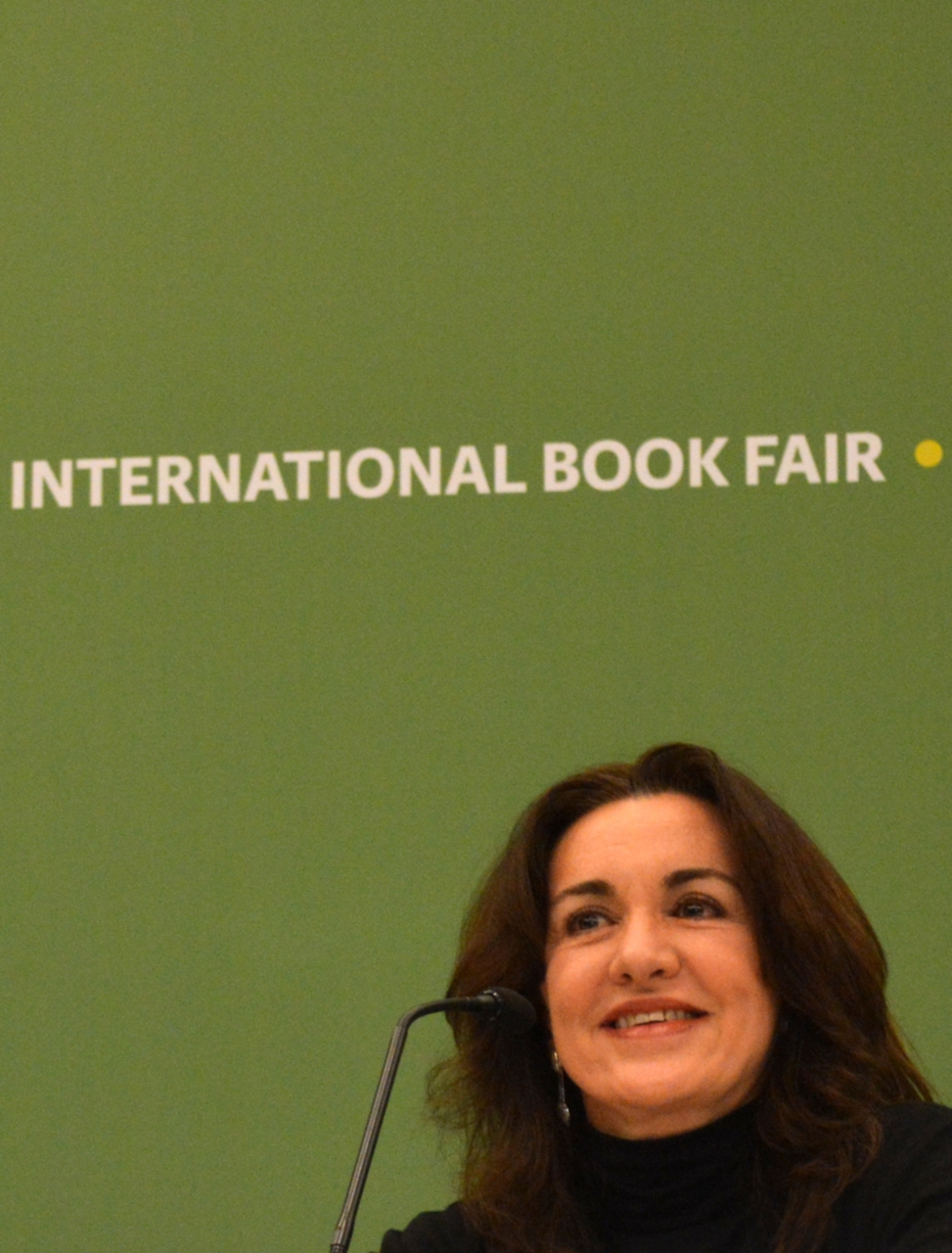
Rosa Beltran (2014)

Beltrán has taught at UCLA, Hebrew University of Jerusalem, Ramon Llull University, University of Colorado and currently teaches in the graduate program in comparative literature at UNAM. She was deputy director of La Jornada Semanal and is a member of the Sistema Nacional de Creadores de Arte. She has worked for Milenio's cultural supplement, Laberinto. Beltrán currently serves as Director of Literature, Coordination of Cultural Outreach at the UNAM, one of the most important cultural centers and educational institutions in the Spanish-speaking world.

== Awards and honors ==
- 1984, creative writing grant (fiction). Judges: Jaime del Palacio and Alejandro Rossi, INBA (Instituto Nacional de Bellas Artes, Mexico).
- 1988, ITT-Fulbright. Fellowship for MA studies in Comparative Literature at UCLA.
- 1990, doctoral fellowship from the Dirección General de Asuntos de Personal Académico (UNAM).
- 1991, Comparative Literature, UCLA, Award for Academic Excellence (teaching and academic performance) (LA).
- 1991, funding from the Fondo Nacional para la Cultura y las Artes.
- 1991, Latin American Center, UCLA, award for the best research project "Re-evaluating the Idea of the Americas: Utopic, Dystopic and Apocalyptic Paradigms" (LA).
- 1992, American Association of University Women (AAUW), award for work written by women and women's participation in culture (Pittsburgh).
- 1993, fellowship from the Centro Mexicano de Escritores.
- 1995, Premio Planeta-Joaquín Mortiz de Novela for her book La corte de los ilusos.
- 1997, Premio Jóvenes Académicos de la UNAM for creative writing.
- 1997, Premio Florence Fishbaum for her essay “América sin americanismos.”
- 1998, Premio Universidad Nacional para Jóvenes Académicos (UNAM).
- 2000, Creative writing grant, Sistema Nacional de Creadores.
- 2000-2003, invitation to a residency at The Writers Room in New York.
- 2011, Reconocimiento Sor Juana Inés de la Cruz, granted by the UNAM.
- 2016, named a member of the Academia Mexicana de la Lengua, chair XXXVI. Unanimous election.
- 2017, Medalla Presea a la Excelencia, IX Festival de Aniversario, Instituto Tecnológico Superior de Cajeme de Cd. Obregón.
- 2017, The Annual Distinguished Alumni Lecture, UCLA Spanish and Portuguese Department.
- 2019, Medalla al Mérito Académico, 25 years, Aula Magna de la Faculta de Filosofía y Letras (UNAM).
- 2022, Premio Excelencia en las Letras José Emilio Pacheco 2022, granted by the Universidad Autónoma de Yucatán through the FILEY.

== Publications ==
=== Novels ===
- La corte de los ilusos (Planeta Publishing Corporation, 1995)
- El paraíso que fuimos (Seix Barral, 2002) El Paraíso que fuimos. Penguin Random House Grupo Editorial México. 27 March 2012. ISBN 978-607-11-1772-4.
- Le Paradise C’etait Nous (La Différence, Paris)
- Alta infidelidad (Alfaguara, 2006) Alta Infidelidad. Penguin Random House Grupo Editorial México. 5 May 2012. ISBN 978-607-11-1294-1.
- Efectos secundarios. Penguin Random House Grupo Editorial México. 1 January 2012. ISBN 978-607-31-0726-6.
- El cuerpo expuesto (Alfaguara, 2013)
- Radicales libres (Alfaguara, 2021)

=== Short stories ===
- La espera (SEP/CREA, Jóvenes Valores de la Literatura, 1986)
- Amores que matan (Joaquín Mortiz, 1996; Editorial Planeta Mexicana Sa De cv, 2008, ISBN 9789703707300)
- Optimistas (Editorial Aldus, 2006) ISBN 9789703510610
- Cuentos darwinianos. Rosa Beltrán, Colección Narrativa Caminante Fernando del Paso, Ficción infantil/juvenil: cuentos, relatos cortos, Letras para volar, Programa Universitario de Fomento a la Lectura. (Universidad de Guadalajara, 2020)
- Disco Voz Viva, Amores que matan. Cuentos darwinianos. Rosa Beltrán, Colección Voz Viva de México (Dirección de Literatura, UNAM, 2021)
- Material de Lectura, No. 137, Cuento Contemporáne. Rosa Beltrán (Dirección General de Publicaciones y Fomento Editorial, UNAM, 2021)

=== Essays ===
Beltrán's essays include the following.

- América sin americanismos. El lugar del estilo en la época (UNAM, 1997)
- Mantis. Sentido y verdad en la cultura literaria posmoderna (UAM, 2010)
- Cómo y por qué empezamos a leer (UNAM, 2022)

=== Chronicles ===
- Acuérdate de Acapulco (FCE, 2021)

== Citations ==
- "Rosa Beltrán ingresa a la Academia Mexicana de la Lengua", El Universal, 29 January 2016
- "Supervivencia del más apto - iMex Revista", iMex Revista, 19 February 2016
