= Eduardo Ramos-Izquierdo =

Mexican writer

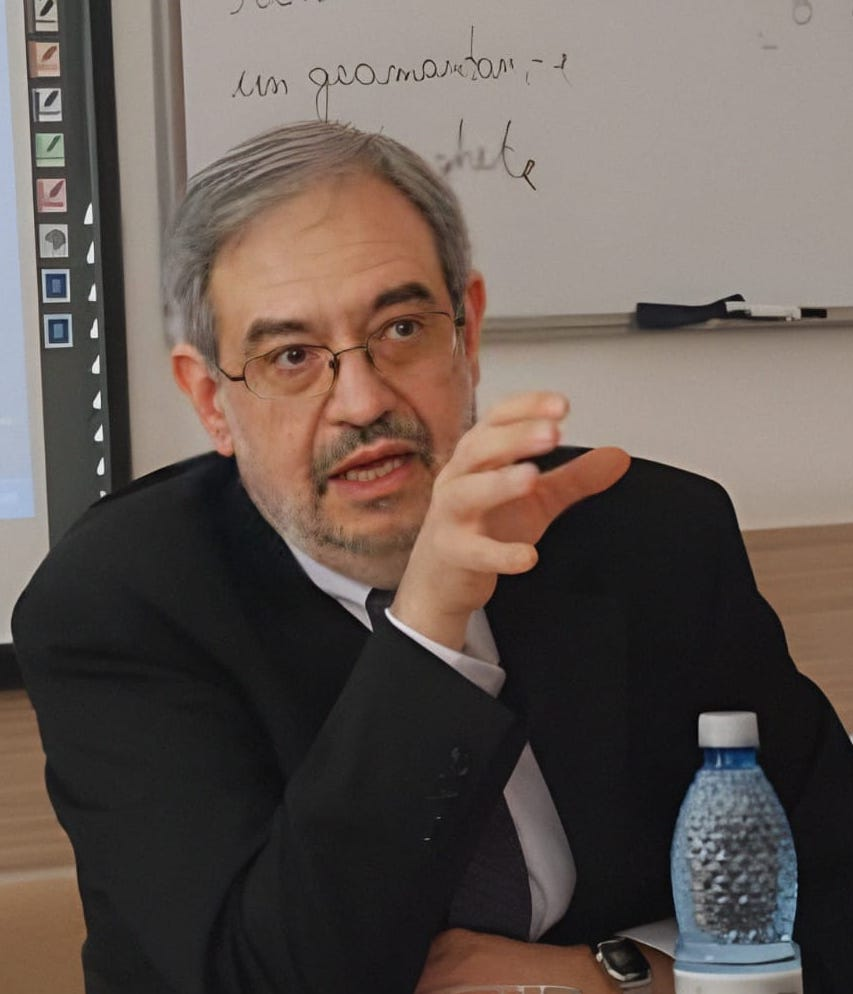
- Born: 1951 (age 74–75); Mexico City
- Occupations: poet, novelist, academic
- Writing career
- Language: Spanish
- Notable works: En la zona prohibida, Los años vacíos, Poesía y poética

Eduardo Ramos-Izquierdo (born 1951, Mexico City) is a Mexican poet, novelist and academic. Since 1980, he has published several collections of poems, short stories and novellas. As a researcher, he has published essays and numerous articles. He is the theorist of the concept of Plural writing.

== Years of formation ==
Born in Mexico City, Ramos-Izquierdo studied literature at the UNAM and at the University of Paris VIII. In 1977, he defended a master's thesis in Hispanic literature on the poetry of José Gorostiza under the supervision of Ramón Xirau. In 1981, he obtained his doctorate in Paris with a thesis on Octavio Paz and Mallarmé.

In parallel to his literary formation, Ramos-Izquierdo also studied music and science. Since his adolescence, he went on to study at the National Conservatory of Music in Mexico and then, in 1986, obtained a second doctorate in musicology from the University of Paris Sorbonne. In 1976, he completed his studies in mathematics at the Faculty of Sciences of the UNAM with a thesis on the axiomatic system. This double experience, both musical and scientific, had a strong impact on his literary creation and contributes to the singularity of his work.

Travel was another key formative element for Ramos-Izquierdo. In 1975, he made a first stay in London, England, which he used to visit part of Europe. Two years later, in November 1977, Ramos-Izquierdo settled permanently in France, from where he would accumulate more than fifty trips to countries in Europe, the East and Africa, which have nourished his culture and writing.

== Literary activity ==
Ramos-Izquierdo cultivates poetic writing as well as prose. In 1981 and 1982, he published his first collections of poems, i² and 7, in which he proposed a poetics of number and metrical play, enunciated in his own language. Later, his poetic writing acquired an existential dimension, reduced to a discreet and personal sphere. It was not until 2005 that the collections of poems written during those two decades of silence were brought together in the volume En las orillas del tiempo. In 2010, five years later, the editorial Arcibel published a more complete edition of his poetic creation.

From the 2000s onwards, Ramos-Izquierdo's prose works also began to be published. Given his particular penchant for the short literary genre, Ramos-Izquierdo favoured short stories and novellas. In 2002, 2003 and 2006, three volumes of his prose fiction were published. In 2012, his second short novel, En la zona prohibida, was translated into Italian. In recent years, some of his new short stories and poetry have been published in literary magazines.

== University work ==
In parallel to his literary activity, Ramos-Izquierdo had a university career as a teacher and researcher. Since 1973 in Mexico, he has taught at the Faculties of Science and Philosophy and Letters of the UNAM. In France, he taught at the universities of Paris 8, Saint-Etienne, Limoges and Paris IV. From 2008 to 2020, he held the chair of Latin American Literature at Paris-IV Sorbonne. As a researcher, he has advised some twenty doctoral theses and published more than a hundred articles and essays. He has also been editor of various academic publications, such as the Adehl publishing house and the online journal Les Ateliers du SAL. In 2008, he began to theorize the concept of Plural writing.

== Works ==
=== Poetry ===
- i², Paris, Capitales, 1981, 72 p.
- 7, Mexico, Katún, 1982, 74 p. ISBN 978-968-430-018-7
- En las orillas del tiempo (1981-2003), Mexico, Rilma 2, 2005, 190 p. ISBN 978-970-94583-0-5
- Poesía y poética (1978-2010), Sevilla, Arcibel, 2010, 344 p. ISBN 978-84-96980-89-1
- A selection of poems in: El Lejano Oriente en la poesía mexicana, Elsa Cross (dir.), UNAM, Mexico, 2023. ISBN 978-607-30-7020-1

=== Novellas ===
- “Los años vacíos”, Los años vacíos, Mexico, siglo xxi, 2002, pp.
- En la zona prohibida, Mexico, Rilma 2, 2006, 74 p. ISBN 978-970-94583-1-2
  - Italian translation: Nella zona proibita, Salerno, Edizioni Arcoiris, 2012, 96 p. ISBN 978-88-96583-24-1

=== Short story ===
- Los años vacíos, Mexico, siglo xxi, 2002, 194 p. ISBN 978-968-23-2374-4
- La dama sombría, Mexico, El viejo pozo/Universidad Autónoma de Chiapas, 2003, 182 p. ISBN 978-968-7495-86-6
- La voz del mar, Mexico, Rilma 2, 2006, 132 p. ISBN 978-970-94583-2-9

=== Translation ===
- "Desgarradura [translation of "Écartèlement" by E. M. Cioran, NRF, 1978]", Vuelta (Mexico), Nº 29, april 1979, pp. 4–8. 1979 [with Octavio Paz].
