= Hernán Lara Zavala =

Mexican novelist and academic (1946–2025)

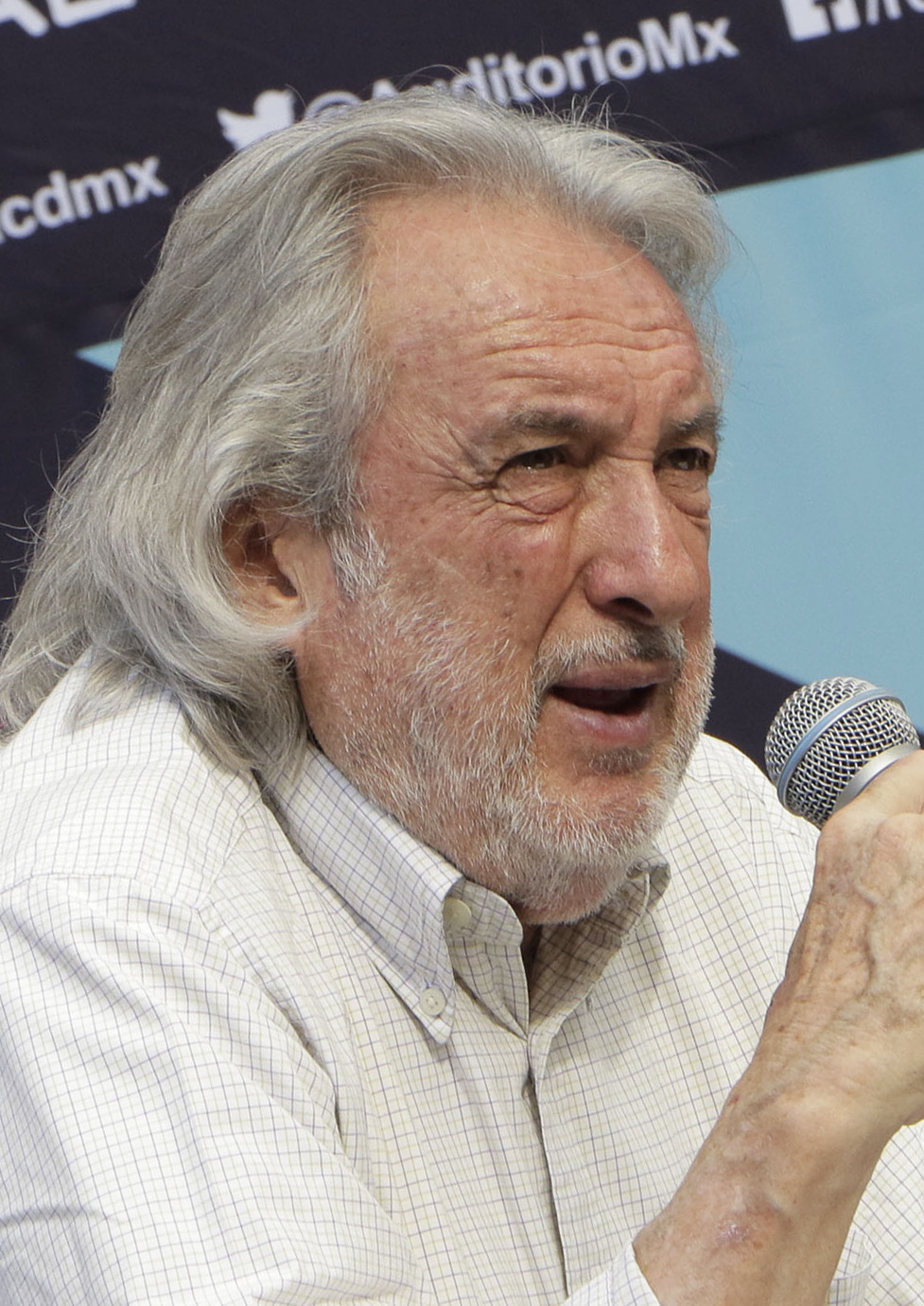
Lara Zavala in 2018

Hernán Lara Zavala (28 February 1946 – 15 March 2025) was a Mexican novelist, literary critic and academic at the National Autonomous University of Mexico (UNAM).

== Life and career ==
Lara Zavala studied English literature at the School of Philosophy and Letters of the National Autonomous University of Mexico and a degree at the University of East Anglia (MA, 1981).

He was a professor at UNAM since 1976, and head of the General Directorate of Publications and Editorial Development at the same institution.

Hernán Lara Zavala died on 15 March 2025, at the age of 79.

== Awards and recognition ==
He was awarded the José Fuentes Mares National Prize for Literature in 1995. In 2010 he was awarded the Royal Academy of the Spanish Language prize.

=== List ===
- (1987) Bellas Artes Colima Narrative Award for Published Work
- (1994) José Fuentes Mares National Prize for Literature, for Después del amor y otros cuentos
- (2008) Yucatán Medal
- (2009) Elena Poniatowska Iberoamerican Award, for Península, península
- (2009) González Ruano journalism prize
- (2010) Real Academia Española Award, for Península, península
- (2010) Justo Sierra Méndez State of Campeche Award, for his life's work
- (2015) Honorary doctorate awarded by the Universidad Autónoma de Campeche, in the framework of the 50th anniversary of said university

== Works ==
Lara Zavala's published works included the following:

- 1981: De Zitilchén
- 1987: El mismo cielo
- 1989: Las novelas en el Quijote
- 1990: Charras
- 1992: Contra el ángel
- 1992: Tuch y Odilón
- 1994: Después del amor y otros cuentos
- 1995: Equipaje de mano
- 1997: Cuentos escogidos
- 1998: Viaje al corazón de la península
- 2008: Península, península
- 2010: El guante negro y otros cuentos
- 2015: Macho viejo
- 2023: El último carnaval
