= Azuela =

Azuela is a Spanish surname. Notable people with the surname include:

- Francisco Azuela (born 1948), Mexican writer and diplomat
- Irene Azuela (born 1979), Mexican actress and producer
- Jorge Toral Azuela, Mexican scouting leader
- Mariano Azuela (1873–1952), Mexican author and physician
- Mariano Azuela Güitrón (1936–2025), Mexican jurist
