= Alberto Ruy Sánchez =

Mexican writer and editor

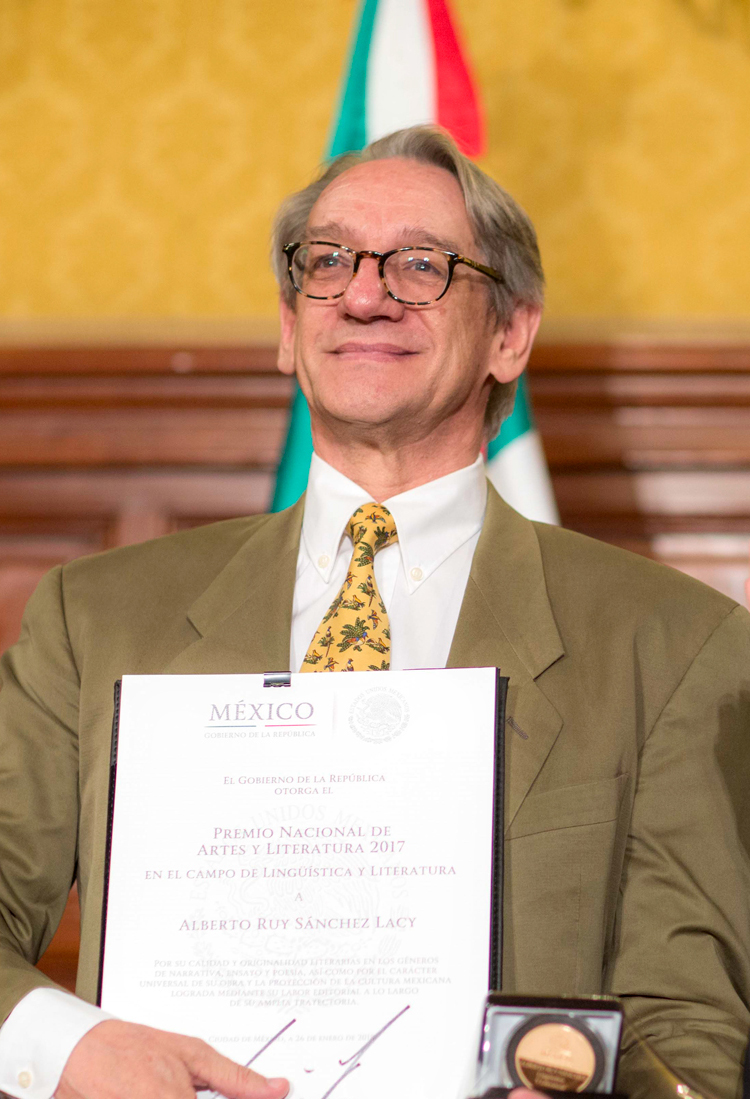
Alberto Ruy Sanchez Lacy receiving Arts and Literature National Prize 2017.

Alberto Ruy-Sánchez Lacy is a Mexican writer and editor born in Mexico City on 7 December 1951. He is an author of fiction, non-fiction and poetry. Since 1988 he has been the chief editor and founding publisher of Latin America's leading arts magazine, Artes de México. He has been a visiting professor at several universities including Stanford, Middlebury and La Sorbonne, and has been invited to give lectures in Europe, Africa, Asia, North America and South America. His work has been praised by Octavio Paz, Juan Rulfo, Severo Sarduy, Alberto Manguel and Claude Michel Cluny and has received awards from several international institutions.

== Early life ==
Ruy-Sánchez's parents, Joaquín Ruy-Sánchez and María Antonieta Lacy, were both born in the northern Mexican state of Sonora. Alberto was the first of five children. For a few years, the family spent almost half the year in Mexico City and the other half in northern Mexico. These relocations included long residence periods in Ciudad Obregón, Sonora and Villa Constitución in the Sonoran desert of Baja California, where Ruy-Sánchez lived from ages three to five. This experience gave him a unique early experience of the desert.

== Career ==
=== Education and reception ===
Ruy-Sánchez lived in Paris from 1975 to 1983. He took writing seminars from his thesis director Roland Barthes, Michel Foucault, Jacques Rancière and André Chastel and received a PhD from the University of Paris. He worked as both an editor and a writer, building on his experiences as managing editor of the Mexican magazine Vuelta, edited by Octavio Paz, from 1984 to 1987. Paz called Ruy-Sánchez, "the strangest of Mexican writers, a true cosmopolitan poet telling stories from a territory wider than just a country because he is the poet from the Skin. That is why his language is the Touch, the sense that implies all the others." The Cuban writer Severo Sarduy wrote that Ruy-Sánchez, "invented not only novels but a new way of reading, the way of poetic lightning stroke." The historian and essayist Alberto Manguel wrote about his novel Los sueños de la serpiente: "based on my experience I can say that this is a masterpiece. One of the most important books written in Spanish in recent years."

=== Journey to Morocco ===
Ruy-Sánchez had forgotten his early childhood experiences until he suddenly recalled them in 1975, visiting the Sahara for the first time. From that involuntary sudden recollection he developed a special creative relationship with the Moroccan desert, especially the walled city of Essaouira (the ancient Mogador), which became a principal setting for most of his novels. As he explains in his essay, "The nine gifts that Morocco gave me":

My first trip to Mogador became a much longer and deeper journey. First came the shock of discovering a place that on spite of being so distant from Mexico provoked a strong impression of recognition, much greater than the one a Mexican receives upon arriving to Spain. A combination of body language, place and objects made me feel that I had ventured into another Mexico.(...) Our legacy derives from five centuries of mixing Indian and Spanish blood, but we must not overlook the Arabic heritage running through our veins, introduced by Spaniards' bodies. We must not forget that for eight centuries two-thirds of what is now Spain and Portugal was Arabic: the Andalusí civilization.

— Alberto Ruy-Sánchez,

=== Inspirations ===
Before travelling to Morocco for the first time as a teenager, and later returning as a college student, Ruy-Sánchez received a severe humanistic education from Jesuit schools in Mexico. From these experiences he gained "a Baroque idea of the world as a complex reality that can only be fully understood and enjoyed with all the senses." The baroque aim of "listening with the eyes, looking with the fingers and the ears, tasting with the smell, etc., as an artistic principle" is a common theme in his poetry and prose.

Ruy-Sánchez's large Sonoran family finally fully emigrated to Mexico City and held weekly meetings where Ruy-Sánchez learned "the big pleasure of hearing and telling stories, and it was there that I felt growing inside me the desire of being a writer." This desire was confirmed when he visited the Djemaa el Fna square in Marrakech in 1975 and 1976, where traditional storytellers are responsible for the square's designation as a UNESCO Oral Human Heritage Site in June 1997.

=== The theme of search in life and writing ===
The theme of the search in Ruy-Sánchez's novels also has its roots in his own life. Specifically, he uses his novels as a means to search for knowledge in the senses of investigating life's mysteries and going beyond observed material reality. Ruy-Sánchez began writing seeking to understand women's desire, through the stories women told him and those he witnessed. This first search led to the novel Mogador, the names of the air. This became a series that included En los labios del agua, Los Jardines secretos de Mogador, and Nueve veces el asombro. The full series took almost twenty years to write, as each published novel generated many letters in response, mostly from women telling their own stories of desire. Sánchez would consider those stories, alter them, and create another book, following this ongoing theme of search.

Ruy-Sánchez had a number of jobs while living in Paris, but in between he became a tantra student, a tantra instructor, and worked for a sexual therapist. This exploration of tantra contributed to the search through writing both in the sense of literally searching for women's desire and in a more spiritual or religious sense of seeking transcendent experiences. Ruy-Sánchez describes in a statement essay his books as "material objects, geometrical compositions, that could help people think, feel, understand and improve their lives".

=== Awards and honors ===
Ruy-Sánchez's books have been translated into several languages – mainly French, but also Portuguese, Italian, German, Arabic, Serbian and Turkish. Only one of his books has been published in English, however. They remain in print in Spanish as cult favorites, unusual for poetry.

His first work, the novel Los nombres del aire (published in English as Mogador: The Names of the Air), came out in 1987, for which he was awarded the Xavier Villaurrutia Award, the most prestigious literary recognition in Mexico. He's also the recipient of the José Emilio Pacheco Prize for Excellence in Writing, and the Mazatlán Prize for Literature.

The University of New Mexico awarded him as Literary Essayist in 1991 and he was also a Fellow of the John Simon Guggenheim Memorial Foundation. In February 2000 he was decorated by the French Government as Officier de l'Ordre des Arts et des Lettres. The Governor of Kentucky awarded him as "Kentucky Colonel", the highest distinction given in that state, where he also is Honnorary Citizen of Louisville. Between 1999 and 2003 he was appointed Chairman of the Creative Non-Fiction Summer Program at the Banff Centre for the Arts in Canada. In November 2006 The Editor's Guild of Mexico awarded him with the Premio Juan Pablos al Mérito Editorial, a lifetime achievement recognition for 26 years of working as an editor and mainly for his work in creating the publishing house Artes de México, a leading cultural project in the Americas.

== Personal life ==
Ruy-Sánchez currently lives in Mexico City with his wife, historian Margarita De Orellana, coeditor of Artes de México, and their two children. He continues to speak internationally and travel within Mexico as a researcher of diverse Mexican cultures.

== Published works ==
Novels

- 1987. Los nombres del aire. English translation as Mogador: The Names of the Air, by Mark Schafer, San Francisco, City Lights, 1993.
- 1996. En los labios del agua
- 1998. De agua y Aire. Disco.
- 2001. Los jardines secretos de Mogador.English translation as The Secret Gardens of Mogador, by Rhonda Dahl Buchanan, Buffalo, New York, White Pine Press, 2008.
- 2005. Nueve veces el asombro.
- 2007. La mano del fuego.
- 2014. Quinteto de Mogador.
- 2018. Los sueños de la serpiente.
- 2021. El expediente Anna Ajmátova.

Short Stories

- 1987. Los demonios de la lengua.
- 1994. Cuentos de Mogador.
- 1999. De cómo llegó a Mogador la melancolía.
- 2001. La huella del grito.

Essays

- 1981. Mitología de un cine en crisis.
- 1988. Al filo de las hojas.
- 1990. Una introducción a Octavio Paz.
- 1991. Tristeza de la verdad: André Gide regresa de Rusia.
- 1992. Ars de cuerpo entero.
- 1995. Con la Literatura en el cuerpo.
- 1997. Diálogos con mis fantasmas.
- 1999. Aventuras de la mirada.
- 2000. Cuatro escritores rituales.
- 2011. La página possible.
- 2011. Elogio del insomnio.
- 2014. Octavio Paz: cuenta y canta la higuera.

Poetry

- 1990. La inaccessible.
- 2006. Lugares prometidos.
- 2006. El bosque erotizado.
- 2011. Decir es desear.
- 2016. Luz del colibrí.
- 2017. Escrito con agua. Poemas de horizontes lejanos.
- 2018. Soy el camino que tomo. Poemas marginales 1970-2018.
- 2019. Dicen las jacarandas.
- 2023. Letras inquietas.
- 2025. El silencio del gato.

== Awards ==
- 1987, Xavier Villaurrutia Award for his novel Los nombres del aire
- 1988, Fellowship, John Simon Guggenheim Foundation, Nueva York
- 1991, José Fuentes Mares National Prize for Literature, for his book Una introducción a Octavio Paz. New Mexico State University and Universidad de Ciudad Juarez.
- 1993, Honorary Member of the Sistema Nacional de Creadores, México
- 1998, Honorary Citizen of Louisville, Kentucky
- 1999, Honorary Member of the chapter Mu Epsilon of the National Hispanic Society Sigma Delta Pi, in the USA
- 1999. Kentucky Colonel, by the Governor of Kentucky
- 2000. Prix des Trois Continents, for the French edition of his novel En los labios del agua
- 2001. Officier de l'Ordre des Arts et des Lettres, by the French Government
- 2002. Honorary Captain of the historical Steam Boat La belle de Louisville
- 2003. Premio Cálamo, by Librería Cálamo and the Universidad de Zaragoza for Los Jardines Secretos de Mogador, Spain
- 2005. Gran Orden de Honor Nacional al Mérito Autoral. By the Instituto Nacional del Derecho de Autor. Mexico
- 2006. Premio a la Excelencia de lo Nuestro. By the Fundación México Unido. México
- 2006. Premio Juan Pablos al Mérito Editorial. By the Cámara Nacional de la Industria Editorial Mexicana (CANAIEM). Mexico
- 2011. Premio San Petersburgo Lee, votación de lectores de la ciudad de San Petersburgo, Rusia
- 2014. Premio Las Pérgolas. Otorgado por la Asociación Mexicana de Libreros.Entregado durante la FIL Guadalajara. Por su "contribución notable a las letras hispánicas"
- 2015. Premio ELENA PONIATOWSKA, Chicago. Otorgado por el NATIONAL MUSEUM OF MEXICAN ARTS, en Chicago. 22 de mayo. Premio compartido con Margarita De Orellana
- 2015. Premio POESTATE 2015. Otorgado por el Festival de Poesía de la ciudad de Lugano, Suiza: POESTATE. 6 de junio. Compartido con Elsa Cross
- 2017. Premio Homenaje al Bibliófilo 2017. Otorgando por la FIL: Feria Internacional del libro de Guadalajara
- 2017. National Prize for Arts and Sciences 2017. Campo de Lingüística y Literatura. Máxima distinción que otorga el estado mexicano desde 1945
- 2018. Premio Mazatlán de Literatura. Por la novela Los sueños de la serpiente
- 2018. Doctorado Honoris Causa. Otorgado por el Centro Universitario de Integración Humanística, CIUH, Estado de México
- 2019. Premio Caracol de Plata. Otorgado por el Festival de Poesía Letras en la Mar. Puerto Vallarta, Jalisco
