= Francisco Azuela =

Mexican writer and diplomat (born 1948)

Francisco Azuela Espinoza
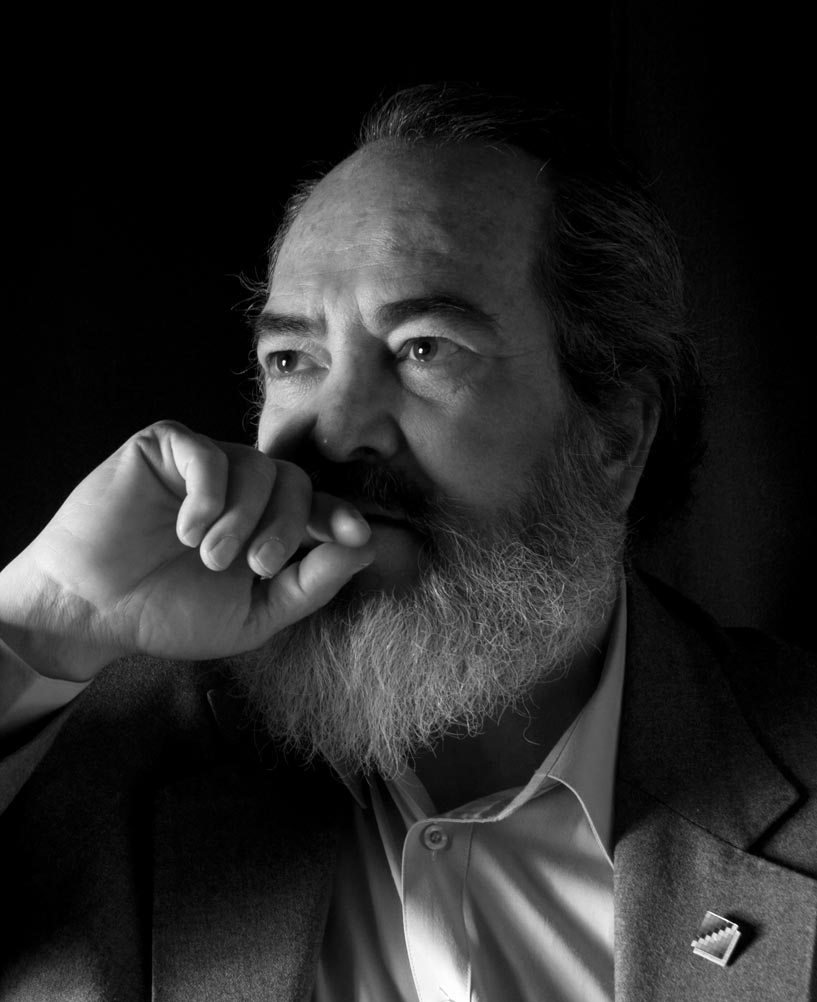
- Born: March 8, 1948 (age 78) León, Guanajuato, Mexico
- Occupation: Writer & Poet
- Genre: poetry, Prose, verse, Tales

Website
- Francisco Azuela Web

Francisco Azuela Espinoza (Note: In this Mexican name, the surname is Azuela and the second or maternal family name is Espinoza.) (born March 8, 1948) is a Mexican writer and poet. He served as a diplomat in the Mexican Embassy in Costa Rica and later in Honduras (1973–1983). During those years the Honduran government awarded him the Order of the Liberator of Central-America Francisco Morazán, and in 1981 the Honduran Academy of Language nominated him for the Cervantes International Literature award. He later served as Director of the Library of the Congress of Guanajuato (1991–1997), and became the CEO and founder of the El Condor de los Andes-Aguila Azteca AC, an international cultural center currently based in the city of Cochabamba, Bolivia (1999).

== Biography ==
=== Birth and childhood ===
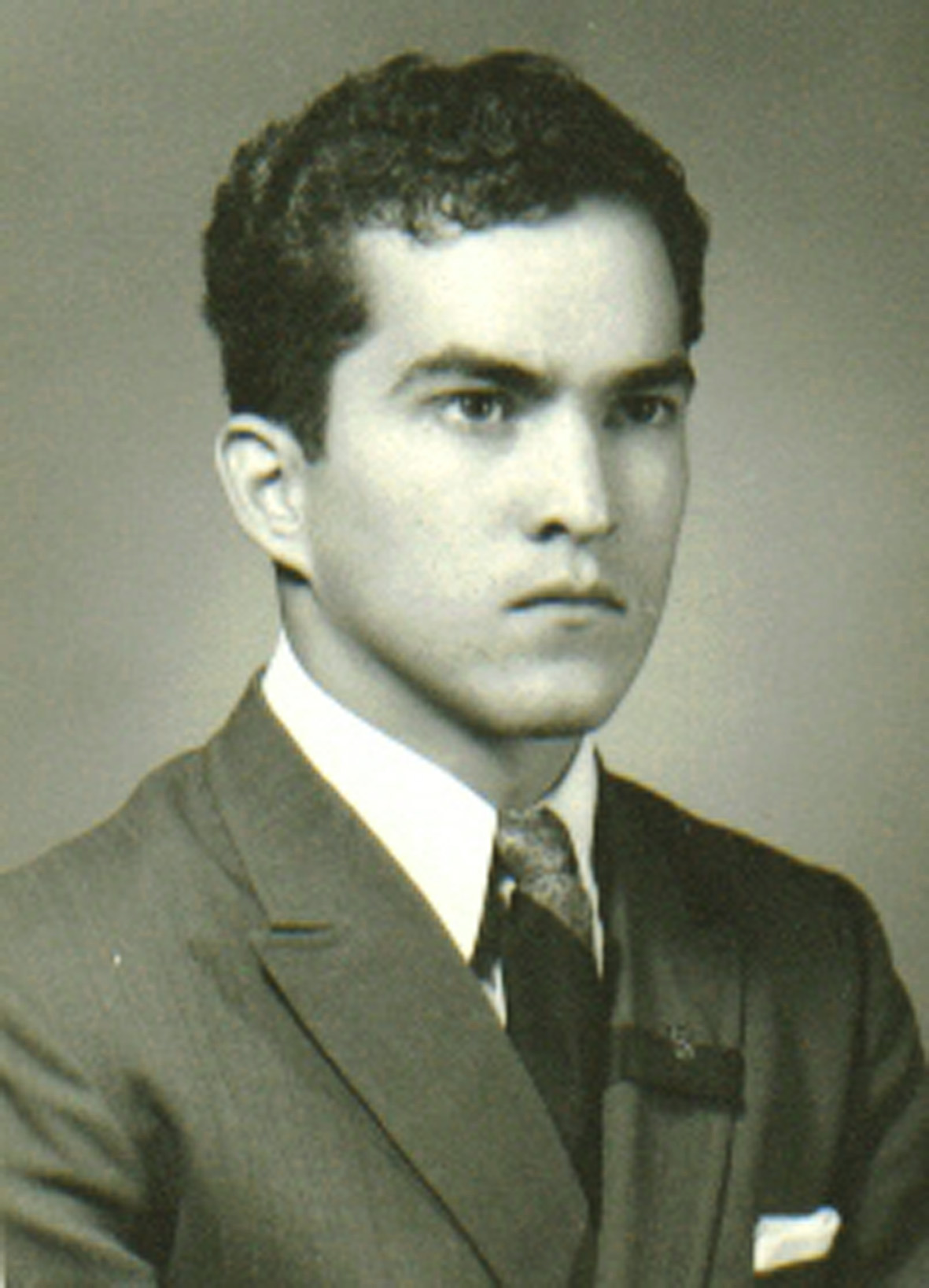
Young poet and writer Francisco Azuela

Francisco Azuela was born on March 8, 1948, at 404 General Emiliano Zapata Street in León, Guanajuato, the fourth of 13 children. His father was the stationmaster of the National Railways of Mexico in the town of Trinidad. From his early childhood he learned of an episode of the Mexican Revolution in which a bullet fired from a train tore a chip from the gate of the Santa Ana Hacienda, causing future president Álvaro Obregón to lose an arm. Azuela grew up in Trinidad and was immersed in the rich Revolutionary history and spirit of the state of Guanajuato during his 17 years of residence there.

Azuela comes from an artistic family of some renown: his great uncle was Mariano Azuela, author of one of the most celebrated novels of the Mexican Revolution, Los de abajo (The Underdogs); his mother, Maria Esperanza de los Dolores Espinosa Hernandez, is a writer and actress, author of several traditionalist novels, including Historia de un Gran Amor (The Story of Great Love); his father, Ricardo Azuela Martin del Campo, was a poet and nephew of Mariano Azuela.

Some of the most enduring memories of his early life when his father taught him to read are these: when he discovered an unknown universe of old locomotives emitting steamy clouds as they passed through town; and an early acquaintance with Maya mythology and legends that later on shaped his poetic imagination. Especially memorable were the Mayan Aluxes, small fantastic creatures living in abandoned ruins and cemeteries and stories of the Chilam Balam, the sacred book of the ancient Maya.

=== Youth ===
Azuela began to express his first thoughts in poetry at a young age. His father, a poet himself, introduced him to great Russian literature, such as Pushkin’s poem Ruslan and Ludmila. Another book that made an indelible mark was the poetry and the odes of the legendary wise king and poet Tezcocan, a.k.a. Netzahualcoyotl. The literature of the Aztec world recorded in the Nahuatl language impressed him early on with its beautiful metaphors and strength of poetic expression, but it also gave him a wealth of information about Mexico’s vast and varied geography: Tenochtitlan, the Valley of Mexico a.k.a. Anahuac Valley; the fabled Atlanteans of Tula with neo-volcanic mountains and highlands; Mexico’s highest volcanoes and cordilleras; and Mexico’s pre-Columbian civilizations, the Olmec, the Maya, Zapotec, the Chichimec, and the Mixtec.

During these formative years Azuela read classic literature, as well as contemporary poets and narrators of diverse origins and nationalities, including writers and poets of social and political perspectives. He came to understand that poets and narrative writers are an invaluable source of social consciousness as they give witness to their life and times.

His father’s death, when Azuela was 20 years old, did not diminish his influence on the nascent literary career of the young man. In Azuela’s poetry loneliness, love, nature, life, death, the spirit of nationalism, war, indifference, despair, hopelessness, abandonment, neglect, fear, anguish appear constantly as themes he shares with other Latin American writers. He also writes about the solitude, the sadness and the suffering that characterizes today’s people, harking back to the pre-Columbian empires of the Incas, the Aztecs and the Mayans. His poetry often reflects the plight of peoples who have been oppressed, neglected, involuntarily involved in wars and endangered by the invasion of Western values.

== Bibliography ==
=== Poetry ===
- El Tren de Fuego (1993)
- La Parole Ardente – The Ardent Word (1993)
- Son las Cien de la Tarde – It's One Hundred P.M. in the Evening(1996)
- Ángel del Mar de mis Sueños – Sea Angel of my Dreams(2000)
- La Parole Ardente 2ª Ed(2002)
- Colección de libros de poesía. Textos en varios idiomas – Collection of Poems and Texts in several languages (2008)
- Antología del Silencio – Silence Anthology: Poetic short stories and other songs.
- Cordillera Real de los Andes (Jacha' a Tata Janqo Khajiri Qollunaka)
- Encuentro de Thunupa y Quetzalcoatl (Thunupa, Tupac Katari y Juancito Pinto. Nuevamente Thunupa y Quetzalcoatl) (2008)
- Latinoamérica en Llamas (book in preparation-2010)

=== Fiction ===
- Rotonda de Gatos Ilustres – Pantheón des Chats Illustres – Illustrous Cats Pantheon(2007)

=== Magazines and articles ===
1. La Estafeta Literaria of Spain (June 1978)
2. The New Postoffice of Spain (No.. II, October 1979)
3. The Arts & Culture Alliance Française de Honduras (August 1979)
4. The Cultural Supplement: O Journal of Lisbon (January 1987)
5. The Role of Literature at the National Center for Information and Promotion of Literature of the National Institute of Fine Arts in Mexico (1994)
6. The Mexico Northern Current Literature, edited by Chapel Hill, IC. USA. . (No. 159, October 1994)
7. The Interactions (Department of German of the University College, London. (No. 1 and 2, 1994)
8. The Rimbaud Revue (Semestriel International de Création littéraire, France et la Communauté Européenne des poètes, (No. 4, 1995. No. 6, 1996 and No.. 7, 1997) "Les Cahiers de la Poesie, (Bimestriel International, Paris, November–December 1994)
9. The Neruda International (edition of John Donne & Co. France, 2000, 2001, 2002)
10. The International Review of Southern Literature, published in France (1996 and 1998)
11. The Jalons of Nantes, Paris. (No. 58, 1997 and No.. 73, 2002) and other literary magazines of Canada, Central America, Spain, Mexico, Portugal, Puerto Rico, Bolivia, France, Austria, Brazil, Italy and Iran.

=== Awards and honors ===
- Decorated by the Honduran government with the Order of the Liberator of Central America "Francisco Morazán", officer' s grade.
- Candidate of the Academy Honduran Language to the International Prize for Literature "Cervantes", Spain, 1981
- Secretary of the Association of Writers of the State of Guanajuato, AC 1994.
- Member of the General Society of Writers in Mexico. Latin American Community of Writers and Member of the International Writers Guild.
- Prometheus Correspondent Poetry Madrid edition of a CD-ROM and Manual Inventory in Spanish Poetry "(IRPE), July 2004. Compiler, Dr. Juan Ruiz de Torres.
- Ambassador of Poetas del Mundo in Bolivia 2005.
- Ambassadeur de la Paix-Universal Peace Ambassador 2006. Geneve Capitale Mondiale de la Paix
- Member of World Poets Society (WPS) A Literary Organization for Contemporary Poets from all around the World, Greece 2006.
- Awarded one of 4 Awards, which awards a prestigious jury,''California State Polytechnic University, through its Department of English and Foreign Languages (College of Letters, Arts, and Social Sciences), to integrate ' 'Spring Harvest International 2006/2007,one of the editions in English most prestigious United States.
- He was invited by the Center for Modern Literature in Iran to participate in the First Congress of Latin American Literature, held from May 26 to June 1, 2007, in the cities of Tehran and Esfahan of the Islamic Republic of Iran.
- Member of the Global Network of Writers in Spanish: REMES. 2009.
- In January 2009 he was appointed by the Department of State Protocol Multicountry of Bolivia – Ministry of Foreign Affairs, to serve on the Commission to commemorate the centenary of Juan Bosch, Short story writer, novelist, essayist, historian, biographer and politician, and former president of the Dominican Republic.
