= Margarita Peña =

Mexican writer, translator, and researcher (1937–2018)

Margarita Peña (née Concepción Margarita Peña Muñoz; August 21, 1937 – October 7, 2018) was a Mexican writer, translator and researcher, doctor of letters, teacher and emeritus professor at the National Autonomous University of Mexico. Her work focused on Mexican literature of the 16th, 17th, and 18th centuries. Her awards include: Premio Universidad Nacional, Premio de la Cámara Nacional de la Industria Editorial, Premio Huehuetlatolli, Premio de Crítica Literaria, and Premio ComuArte.

== Early life and education ==
Concepción Margarita Peña Muñoz was born in Mexico City, August 21, 1937.

She received her bachelor's and master's degrees in Hispanic literature at the National Autonomous University of Mexico; and her doctorate from El Colegio de México.

== Career ==
She was a professor of New Spanish literature, as well as of Golden Age literature. She served as a teacher at the undergraduate level for more than thirty years at the Faculty of Philosophy and Letters of the National Autonomous University of Mexico. She belonged to the Sistema Nacional de Investigadores (SNI) (level III) since 2003 and was Coordinator of the Extraordinary Chair "Juan Ruiz de Alarcón". She taught in various universities in Mexico and abroad.

She was widely activity in the world of letters, her work extending to the creation of articles, essays, critical editions, compilations and anthologies, short stories, essays, and newspaper articles, among others. Her constant work in the Archivo General de la Nación gave her access to letters, sonnets, romances, declarations of prisoners, spells, and even a fragment of a treatise on palmistry. The work that brings together a wide variety of these writings is called La palabra amordazada, and presents literature censored by the Mexican Inquisition during the colonial period. She wrote more than thirty essays. Her impressive work in document rescue makes her an important Mexican writer and literary figure. The critical edition of the New Spanish songbook of the 16th century, Flores de baria poesía, is part of her work, as is the novel, El amarre.

== Personal life ==
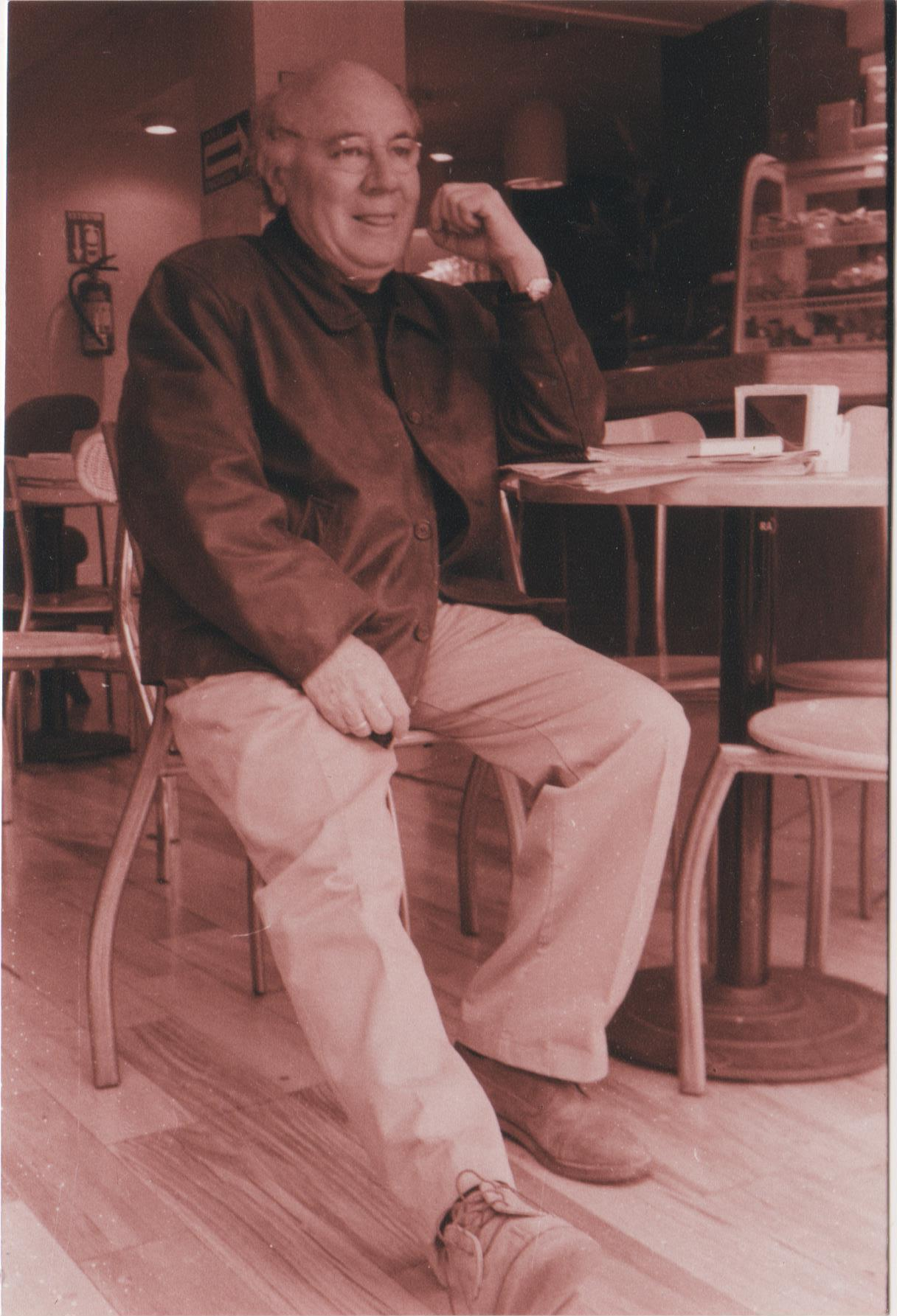
Pena's husband, the writer, Federico Campbell

Pena's husband was Federico Campbell. They had one son, the journalist, Federico Campbell Peña.

She died of heart problems in Mexico City, October 7, 2018.

== Awards and honours ==
Her awards and honours include:

- 1993, Premio Universidad Nacional
- 1991, Premio de la Cámara Nacional de la Industria Editorial
- 1986, Premio Huehuetlatolli from the Chamber of Deputies
- 2000, Premio de Crítica Literaria from the Universidad Autónoma de Ciudad Juárez
- 2000, Premio COMUARTE (Coordinadora Internacional de Mujeres en el Arte)

== Selected works ==
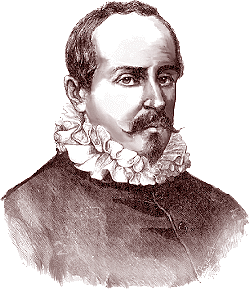
Peña was a great expert on Juan Ruiz de Alarcón and his time.

The titles of her other works are:

- Emisión y emblemática de un oráculo hispanoitaliano
- Juan Ruiz de Alarcón: reconstrucción biográfico-crítica
- Mofarandel de los oráculos de Apolo
- Libro del juego de las suertes
- Literatura entre dos mundos
- Descubrimiento y conquista de América
- Los cuadernos de Sor Juana
- Juan Ruiz de Alarcón ante la crítica
- La palabra amordazada
- Quiromancia y adivinación en la Nueva España
- El teatro novohispano en el siglo XVIII
- Los varios tonos de la relación Lope de Vega-Juan Ruiz de Alarcón
- Aventuras de Lula y el duende piernas largas
- Alarcón, Cervantes: Una mirada alterna
