= Edgar Chías =

Edgar Chías (born 1973) is a Mexican playwright, actor, and theatre critic. He was born in Mexico City and attended UNAM where he studied theatre. He has written a number of plays including De insomnio y media noche, which was performed at the Royal Court Theatre in London in 2006 under the title On Insomnia and Midnight (English translation by David Johnston). He won the Oscar Liera Prize for Best Contemporary Play in 2007 for both Crack and De insomnio y media noche.
