= Mónica Lavín =

Mexican author

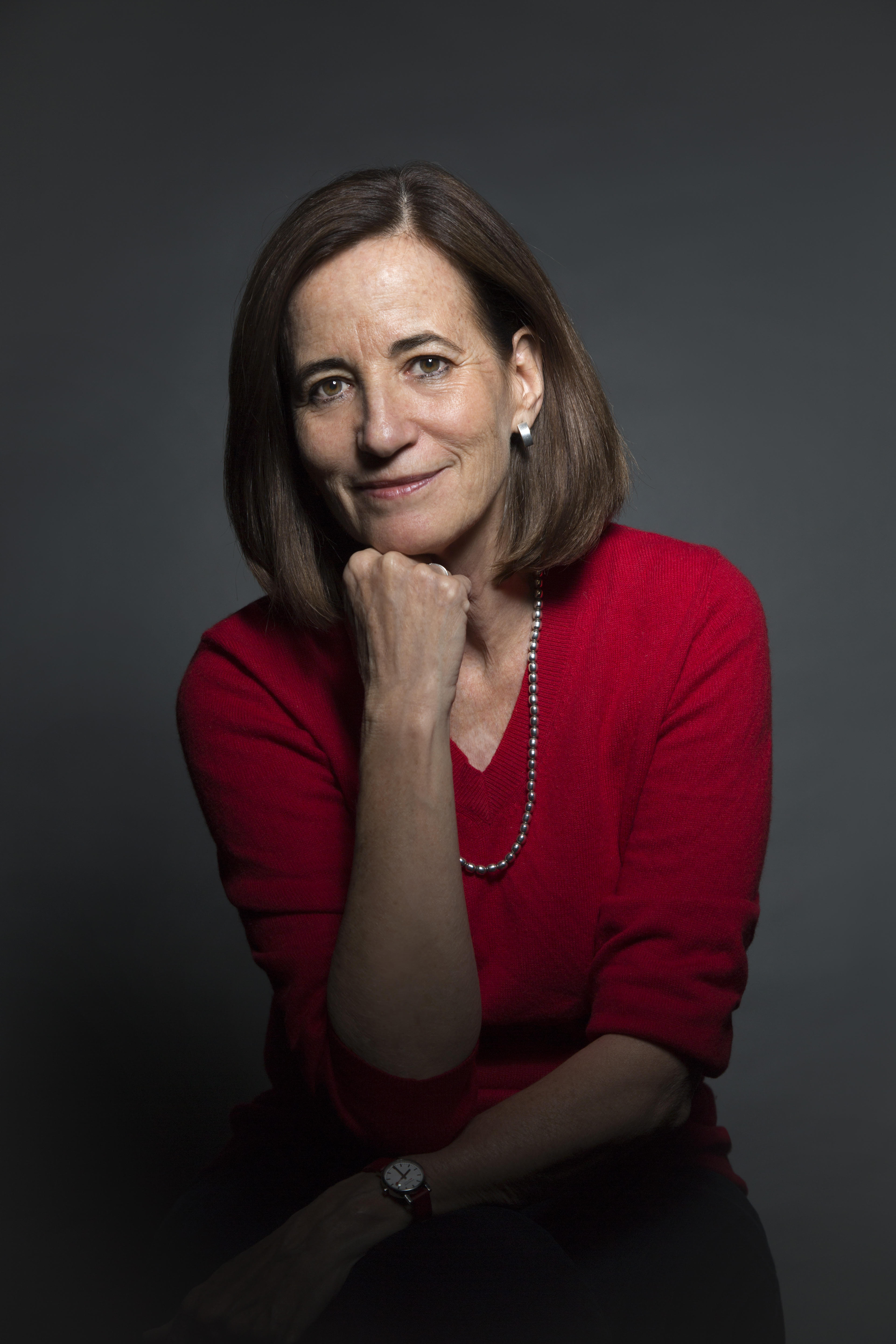
- Writer and journalist, Mónica Lavín
- Born: 22 August 1955 (age 70); Mexico City, Mexico
- Occupation: writer
- Notable work: Yo, la peor; Ruby Tuesday no ha muerto; Café cortado; Cuando te hablen de amor
- Website: https://www.monicalavin.mx

Mónica Lavín (born August 22, 1955) is a Mexican author of eleven novels, various books of nonfiction, and thirteen short story collections, notable among them Ruby Tuesday no ha muerto (1996 recipient of the Gilberto Owen National Literary Prize); Uno no sabe (2003, finalist for the Antonin Artaud award); and her most recent collection, La corredora de Cuemanco y el aficionado a Schubert (Punto de Lectura, 2008).

In addition, she was awarded the Elena Poniatowska Ibero-American Novel Prize for her work Yo, la peor (2010). Her novel Cuando te hablen de amor (2017) was a finalist for the 2019 Mario Vargas Llosa Biennial Prize for the Novel.

She is a member of the Sistema Nacional de Creadores (FONCA), was a teacher for the SOGEM Writers’ School, and was a professor in the Creative Writing Department of the Universidad Autónoma de la Ciudad de México in México City from 2000 to 2024. In 2025, she supports aspiring writers via her online platform.

== Biography ==
Mónica Lavín was born on 22 August 1955 in Mexico City, Mexico. She earned a degree in biology from the Metropolitan Autonomous University. Lavín began writing when she was a teenager, completing her first stories around age thirteen. Her best known works include Café cortado, awarded best book of the year (Premio Narrativa de Colima 2001) and La más faulera (Grijalbo), a novel for young readers that has been reprinted several times. Her novel Despertar los apetitos (Alfaguara, 2005), combines Lavín's passions for food and travel and is based on her trip across Canada on the Transcanadian Railway as a gastronomy journalist. Yo, la peor (Grijalbo, 2009), a historical novel about Mexican poet and scholar Sor Juana Inés de la Cruz, was very well received by critics and readers and won the Elena Poniatowska Ibero-American Novel Prize (Spanish: Premio Iberoamericano de Novela Elena Poniatowska). Her book of essays Leo luego escribo: ideas for enjoying reading (Lectorum, 2000) was chosen for the National Classroom Library Program. Her work is widely anthologized in Mexico and around the world (United States, Italy, Canada, France, Spain, Panamá). In 2025, she launched her online creative writing course project to support aspiring writers.

== Screenwriter, columnist, public appearances ==
As a documentary screenwriter, Lavín received the Pantalla de Cristal Award (2010) for coauthoring "Bajo la región más transparente" about Mexican writer Carlos Fuentes. She appears frequently on radio, television and writes for the print media. She has given conferences and lectures in various forums and universities in México as well as abroad. She wrote the musical and cuisine show for the band Mariachi Charanda entitled "Canciones a la Carta".

Lavín has also published many non-fiction works in the fields of scientific and food journalism. She is a contributor to a variety of periodicals including El Economista, El Universal, Época, La Plaza, La Vida Literaria, Memoria de Papel, Mundo Celular, Nonotza, and Vértigo. She was a Literary resident in the Banff Centre for the Arts in Canada, the Yaddo Colony of the Arts in Saratoga Springs and The Hermitage Retreat in Florida. She has worked as a publisher, scriptwriter; and radio and television host in conversation with other writers. She has been invited to give lectures and readings in Mexico and abroad. She writes for the cultural section of the El Universal newspaper, Fahrenheit art magazine, and interviews writers for public television in Mexico.

Lavín is a columnist for the newspaper El Universal, and in addition has given conferences both in Mexico as well as in Italy, France, the US, and Canada. Currently she contributes the column "Dorar la pildora" in the Cultural Section of El Universal, and she also writes for the magazine Fahrenheit. In 2011, she participated in the Annual Writers' Conference held in San Miguel de Allende, Guanajuato, as well as in a conference at the Instituto de Artes Gráficas in Oaxaca. Additionally, she is the host of the radio program "Ficcionario de Código DF" that is broadcast on the Internet. From 2016 to 2021 she was the co-host with writer Rosa Beltrán of a literary talk show on Canal 22, "Contraseñas".

== Awards and recognition ==
Lavín received the Gilberto Owen National Literary Prize in 1996 for her work Ruby Tuesday no ha muerto. She was awarded the Premio Narrativa de Colima in 2001 for Café cortado and was a finalist for the Antonin Artaud award with Uno no sabe in 2003. Her novel Yo, la peor was the 2010 winner of the Elena Poniatowska Ibero-American Novel Prize. Her novel "Cuando te hablen de Amor" was a finalist for the III Premio Bienal Mario Vargas Llosa in 2019, and shared the 2023 Sinaloa National Award for literature (el Premio Nacional Letras de Sinaloa) along with the Mexican poet Mario Bojórquez. In 2025, Lavín was awarded El Premio Crónica awarded for a Mexican national's "contributions to Mexican culture."

== Selected works ==
=== Collections of stories ===
- Cuentos de desencuentro y otros (1986)
- Nicolasa y los encajes (1991)
- Retazos (1995)
- Ruby Tuesday no ha muerto (1996)
- La isla blanca (1998)
- Por sevillanas (2000)
- Uno no sabe (2004), Finalist Antonin Artaud Award
- La corredora de Cuemanco y el aficionado a Schubert (Punto de Lectura, 2008)
- Pasarse de la raya (2010)
- La casa chica (2012)
- La tierra incierta (Flash, November 2012)
- Manual para enamorarse (Grijalbo 2012)
- El lado salvaje (Tusquets 2024)

=== Novels ===
- Tonada de un viejo amor (Plaza y Janes, 1996), (reissued by Planeta 2023)
- Cambio de vías (Plaza & Janés 1999)
- Café cortado (Random House Mondadori 2001)
- Despertar los apetitos (2005)
- Hotel Limbo (Alfaguara 2008)
- Yo, la peor (Planeta 2009), Winner Elena Poniatowska Award
- Las rebeldes (Grijalbo 2011)
- Doble filo (Lumen 2014)
- Cuando te hablen de amor (Planeta 2017)
- Todo sobre nosotras (Planeta 2019)
- Últimos días de mis padres (Planeta, 2022)
- La ausencia (Planeta, 2025)

=== Nonfiction and essays ===
- Planeta azul, planeta gris (ADN Editores, 1998) - essays on the degradation of the environment
- Es puro cuento: Cuaderno de escritura (Selector, 2016)
- Leo, luego escribo (2001)
- Sor Juana en la cocina (2010) con Ana Benítez Muro
- Méxicontemporáneo: panorama de creadores (Aguilar, 2016)

=== Young adult fiction ===
- La más faulera (1997)
- La línea de la carretera (Plaza & Janés 2004; Random House Mondadori 2008)
- Camila y el cuadro robado (2019, Planeta)

=== Anthology ===
- Points of Departure: new stories from México (City Lights Books, 2000), Edited by Mónica Lavín (English)
- Cuentos de ida y vuelta, short stories by Lavín and Colombia writer Octavio Escobar (Editora Regional de Extremadura, 2021)

=== Translations ===
- Meaty Pleasures (Katakana Editores, 2021), translation by Dorothy Potter Snyder.
- La inesperada amiga de Carlos (에바사우루스와 카를로스의 비밀 친구) (La Planta 2023), children's book.
