= Alejandro Ariceaga =

Mexican writer and journalist

Alejandro Ariceaga (1949–2004) was a Mexican writer and journalist.

He was born in Toluca on 21 August 1949. He was a member of the tunAstral group and his first works were published in the group's journal. He worked for a number of newspapers and cultural magazines. He became known as a short-story writer, publishing Cuentos Alejandrinos (Alexandrine Tales) in 1967 and winning the Premio Estatal de Cuento in 1983 for Ciudad tan bella como cualquiera (A City as Beautiful as Any). He was also noted for La identidad secreta del camaleón antiguo (The Old Chameleon's Secret Identity, 1980) and Clima templado (Temperate Weather, 1983).

He died in Barcelona on 27 September 2004.

== Works ==
- Seven Stories Alexandrians (1967)
- Other People (1973)
- The Old Chameleon Secret Identity (1980)
- A Short Term (1981)
- Temperate Weather (1983)
- City As Beautiful As Any (1985)
- Placeres3 (2001)
- Litter Damn (2002)
