= Federico Campbell =

Mexican writer

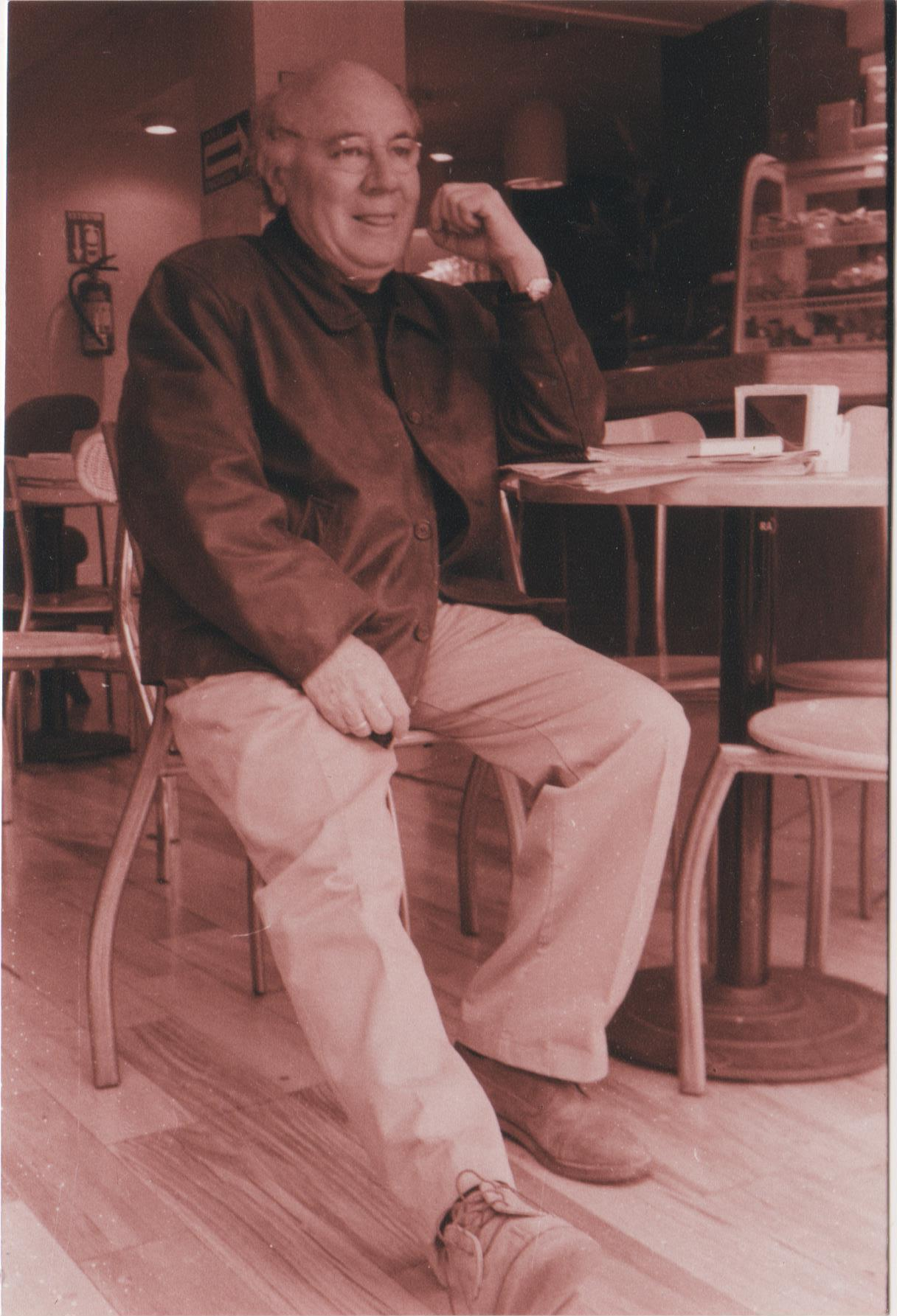
- Born: Federico Campbell Quiroz; 1 July 1941; Tijuana, Baja California, Mexico
- Died: 15 February 2014 (aged 72); Mexico City, Mexico
- Occupations: Journalist, writer, essayist, translator, narrator
- Years active: 1971–2014
- Children: 1

Federico Campbell Quiroz (July 1, 1941 – February 15, 2014) was a Mexican writer. Campbell is known for the short story collection Tijuanenses (Tijuana: Stories on the Border). In 2000, he won the Colima Prize for Fiction with his novel Transpeninsular. In 1995, he was awarded the J. S. Guggenheim Fellowship. Campbell translated works by Harold Pinter, David Mamet, and Leonardo Sciascia, among others, into Spanish.

Born in Tijuana, Mexico, Campbell was the son of Carmen Quiroz, a teacher, and Federico Campbell, a telegraph operator whose ancestors migrated to Mexico from Virginia in the 1830s. He had two sisters, Sarina and Silvia Campbell Quiroz, and with Margarita Peña Muñoz, a Mexican translator and researcher of Novohispanic literature, had one son, Federico Campbell Peña, who is a journalist.

== Works ==
- Pretexta (1979)
- Todo lo de las focas (1982; All about Seals)
- Tijuanenses (1989; Tijuana: Stories on the Border, 1995)
- La memoria de Sciascia (1989; Sciascia's Memory)
- La invención del poder (1994; The Invention of Power)
- Post scriptum triste (1994)
- Máscara negra (1995; Black Mask)
- Transpeninsular (2000)
- La clave Morse (2001; The Morse Code)
- El imperio del adiós (2002; The Empire of Farewell).
