= Leandro Montemayor =

Leandro Montemayor is a fictional President of the Philippines in the hit Philippine television drama series, Kung Mawawala Ka (When You're Gone) played by actor Eddie Garcia.

== Biography ==
=== Personal life ===
Montemayor was born and raised in the fictional province of San Dionisio. He married Iluminada (played by Liza Lorena), the daughter of a wealthy and prominent political family in the province for his future ambitions, to whom he has three children namely Ernestina (played by Princess Punzalan), Alberto (played by Raymond Bagatsing) and Paloma (played by Alessandra de Rossi). Leandro also has two other families, Czarina (played by Gloria Diaz), the original mistress and mother to Amanda (played by Sharmaine Arnaiz) and Lucinda (played by Ara Mina). And finally, Alicia (played by Hilda Koronel), the love of Leandro's life and mother to Rosa Camilla (played by Sunshine Dizon), Leandro's favorite daughter.

The story begins with the failed murder attempt on the governor's life and consequently makes the three women and all their children suspects in the investigation. This crime mystery angle provides the backdrop to the love story of Rosa Camilla and Carlito (played by Cogie Domingo), the son of Leandro's political rival, Congressman Carlos Valiente.

=== Early Political Life ===
Leandro started as a mayor of a town in the fictional province of San Dionisio, then the Governor of San Dionisio. With the massive political machinery and influence of his wife's family, he started a dynasty in which he started a rivalry with Congressman Carlos Valiente. But a tragic event came to Leandro when the Valientes were killed in an ambush that blamed to Montemayor, resulting to massive demonstrations and riots against Montemayor by supporters of the Valientes that led to a case against him of murder. He was tried and found not guilty of the charges and in an ending twist of the case, it was discovered that Leandro's son, Alberto ordered the ambush.

After the victory in court, Leandro attained national popularity that led to his decision to run as a Senator of the Philippines. His popular slogan when campaigning for the Senate was "Ngayon sa Senado, Bukas sa Malacañang!" (Today, the Senate, and Tomorrow, Malacañang) pertaining the official residence of the President of the Philippines, the Malacañan Palace, hinting a run to the Presidency in the near future. But another crisis emerged from his family when his position as Governor will have to be vacated because of his Senate run. Two emerged as potential successors to Leandro, Amanda, Leandro's Chief of Staff and his daughter-lawyer who helped him win his cases in court and his legal wife, Iluminada, who told Leandro of her intention to run, giving credence to her family connections in politics. Initially, Leandro did not choose from the two, he originally chose his third wife, Alicia, whom he described as the one people love. But Alicia did not accept Leandro's invitation to run. Leandro endorses Iluminada to run as Governor of San Dionisio against Justice Romina Salgado (played by Armida Siguion Reyna), Valiente's mother-in-law. In the end of the elections, Leandro won a seat in the Senate and Iluminada was defeated by Romina.

=== Senate Years ===
During his Senate years, his Alzheimer's disease started to develop, leading to his loss of certain memories regarding events and even suffered blurred vision known only to his personal secretary and legislative adviser.

=== Presidency ===
He ran as president against Tomas Locsin (played by Eddie Gutierrez), a billionaire businessman who became Czarina's (Leandro's first mistress) husband. When Leandro won the presidency, Locsin plotted a coup against Montemayor along with some generals in the Armed Forces of the Philippines months after he became president. With Locsin's money and the support of certain elements of the military, they emerged victorious in deposing Montemayor from the presidency. During his campaign for the presidency and even during his presidency, he kept his disease from the public.
