= Elizabeth Algrávez =

Mexican poet, translator, and editor (born 1972)

Elizabeth Algrávez (born 1972) is a Mexican poet, translator, and editor who was born in Mexicali.

Algrávez graduated from Centro de Estudios Literarios. She has a degree in Hispanic-American language and literature as well as a master's degree in marketing. Algrávez was the former director of Instituto Municipal de Arte y Cultura de Tijuana and a lecturer at Universidad Autónoma de Baja California.

Algrávez has published five books.

== Selected works ==
- Cantos buranos (1993)
- Arenario (1994)
- La Mujer habitada (1994)
- Trilogía de arena (1999)
- Venenos (2011)
