= Daniel Sada =

Mexican novelist, poet, and journalist

Daniel Sada Villarreal (February 25, 1953, in Mexicali, Baja California – November 18, 2011, in Mexico City) was a Mexican poet, journalist, and writer, whose work has been hailed as one of the most important contributions to the Spanish language.

== Life ==
Sada was born in Mexicali in 1953. He studied journalism and Spanish literature in Sacramento, Coahuila, showing especial affinity for the works of Dante and Ovid. Sada later said of his early influences, his first contacts with literature, and the metric structures he admired: "I have a deep knowledge, from childhood, of the most elemental constructions of these metric forms, so characteristic of Spanish. In my primary school in Sacramento, Coahuila, Panchita Cabrera, a rural schoolteacher who was an ardent fan of the Spanish Golden Age (a type that no longer exists) taught us these phonetic techniques with one goal in mind: that we might fine-tune our ears in order to appreciate the expressive delicacy and virulence of our language". He was a professor at the Autonomous University of Zacatecas, The Hispanic Academy of San Miguel de Allende, and the Carlos Setién Garcia School of Journalism.

Sada organized many poetry workshops in Mexico City and several other cities. He was granted a scholarship by the INBA and FONCA and, since 1994, he was member of the Sistema Nacional de Creadores de Arte.

Sada died from renal failure brought upon by diabetes on November 18, 2011 in Mexico City. Hours before Sada's death, he was awarded Mexico's prestigious National Prize for Arts and Sciences in the Literature category. Sada never learned of this honor as he had been under sedation immediately prior to his death.

== Legacy ==
Sada’s novels stand out for their internal rhythm and unorthodox use of archaic metric forms and colloquialisms. His work has been described as baroque and tragicomic. Author Juan Villoro stated: "He renewed the Mexican novel with Because It Seems to be A Lie, the Truth is Never Known". According to Roberto Bolaño: "Daniel Sada is undoubtedly writing some of the most ambitious works in the Spanish language". Rafael Lemus said: "Sada...is one of the most extreme reformers of the (Spanish) language, the boldest among Mexicans".

In 2008, he won the prestigious Herralde Prize for his novel Almost Never. He also won the Xavier Villaurrutia Prize in 1992 and the Jose Fuentes Mares National Literature Prize in 1999. His works have been translated into English, German, French, Dutch, Bulgarian, and Portuguese. In the hours before Sada’s death 2011, he was awarded Mexico's prestigious National Prize for Arts and Sciences in the literature category.

== Awards ==
- 1992 - Xavier Villaurrutia Award, for Registro de causantes.
- 1999 - Jose Fuentes Mares National Literature Prize, for Porque parece mentira la verdad nunca se sabe.
- 2006 - Premio Nacional de Narrativa Colima para Obra Publicada, for Ritmo Delta.
- 2008 - Premio Herralde de Novela, for Casi nunca.
- 2011 - National Prize for Arts and Sciences, Linguistics and Literature.

== Films adaptations ==
- 2004 - Una de dos. Directed by Marcel Sisniega.
- 2007 - El Guapo. Directed by Marcel Sisniega (based on Luces artificiales).

== Works ==
=== Short stories ===
- Un rato (UAM-I, 1985)
- Juguete de nadie y otras historias (FCE, Letras Mexicanas, 1985)
- Los siete pecados capitales (colectivo), (CONACULTA/INBA/SEP, 1989)
- Registro de causantes (Joaquín Mortíz, 1990)
- Tres historias (UAM/Juan Pablos/CNCA/INBA/Cuadernos del Nigromante, 1991)
- Antología presentida (Conaculta, 1993)
- Todo y la recompensa. Cuentos completos (Debate, 2002)
- Ese modo que colma (Anagrama)
- Una de dos / One or the Other, translated by Ellen Calmus. Tameme, 1999.

=== Novels ===
- Lampa vida (Premiá Editora, 1980)
- Albedrío (Leega Literaria, 1989, Tusquets, 2001)
- Una de dos (Alfaguara, 1994, Tusquets, 2002)
- Porque parece mentira la verdad nunca se sabe (Tusquets, 1999).
- Luces artificiales (Joaquín Mortiz, 2002)
- Ritmo delta (Planeta Mexicana, 2005)
- La duración de los empeños simples (Joaquín Mortiz, 2006).
- Almost Never (Casi nunca) (Anagrama, 2008).
- A la vista (Anagrama, 2011).
- El lenguaje del juego (Anagrama, 2012).

=== Poetry ===
- Los lugares (UAM, La Rosa de los Vientos, 1977).
- El amor es cobrizo (Ediciones Sin Nombre, 2005).
- Aquí (FCE, 2008).

=== Various ===
- El límite (Vuelta, 1997)
