= José Gordon =

Mexican writer (born 1953)

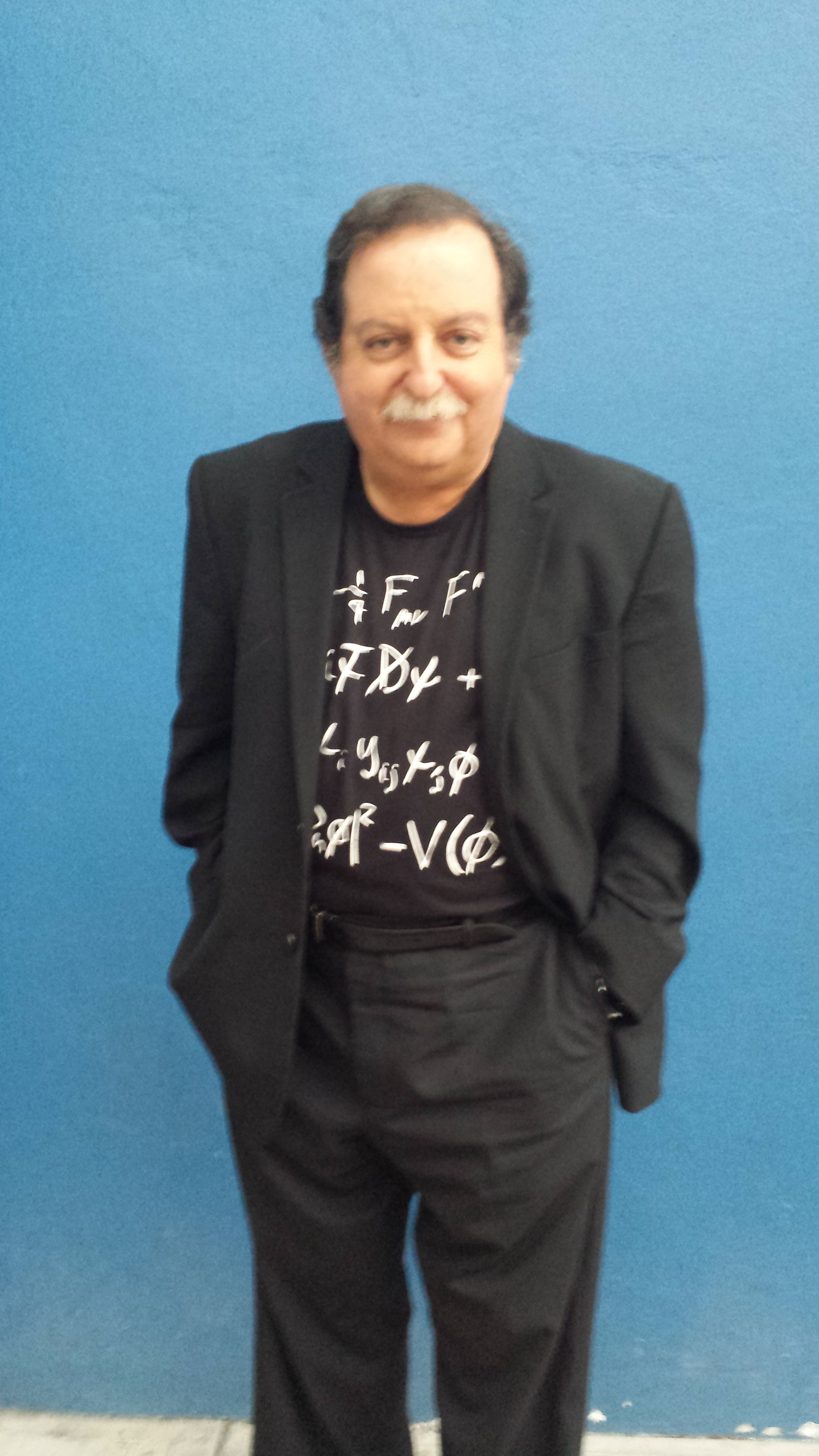
- Born: 1953 (age 72–73) Mexico
- Occupation: Writer, translator, essayist, journalist
- Language: Spanish

José Gordon (born 1953, Mexico) is a Mexican novelist, essayist, translator and cultural journalist. He worked as anchorman in Noticiario Cultural 9:30 and in the literary gazette Luz Verde in Canal 22. He is editor in chief in the gazette La Cultura en México of the magazine Siempre!. He collaborates with the newspapers La Jornada and Reforma. He was acknowledged with the National Journalism Award in 1994.

He writes the column of sciences and arts in the Revista de la Universidad de México ("Magazine of the University of Mexico"). He produces and leads the TV series Imaginantes, which is broadcast by Televisa and was awarded in the New York Film Festival. He directs La Oveja Eléctrica, a publication where he talks with the most notable contemporary scientists. He consults the magazine Muy Interesante, where he publishes about the paradoxes of the scientific and poetic knowledge.

== Works ==
- Tocar lo invisible, Planeta, 1995
- El novelista miope y la poeta hindú, UNAM, 2002
- El cuaderno verde, Ediciones B, 2007
- Revelado instantáneo (en colaboración con Guadalupe Alonso), Joaquín Mortiz, 2004
- El libro del destino, Nueva Imagen, 1996.
