= Bárbara Colio =

Mexican playwright and actress (born 1969)

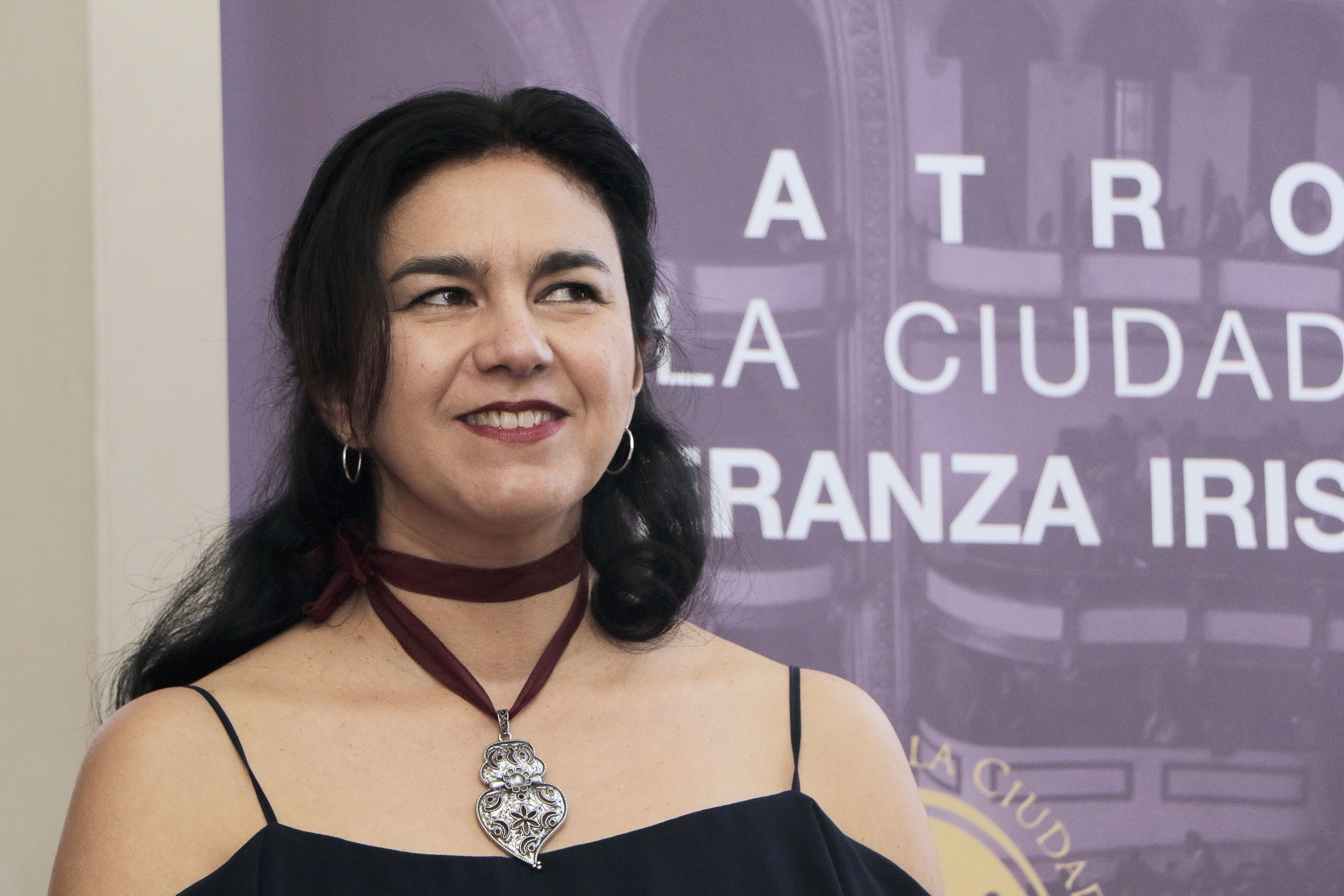
- Born: 1969 (age 56–57)
- Education: Autonomous University of Baja California
- Occupations: Playwright and actress

Bárbara Colio (born 1969) is a Mexican playwright and theater director. She was born in Mexicali in Baja California. She studied engineering at Autonomous University of Baja California (UABC) where she also started her theatrical career, first appearing as an actress in 1988. In 1998, she moved to Madrid, Spain, to study with the writer Jose Sanchis Sinisterra. In 2000, Colio was the first Mexican playwright officially invited to an International Residency at the Royal Court Theater in London.

== Work ==
Colio has written more than 30 plays, including La boca de lobo, Pequeñas certezas, Usted está aquí, El día más violento, Ventana Amarilla, Cuerdas, Instinto, Humedad, Latir. La boca de lobo was produced at the Festival Cervantino in Guanajuato in 2004. Pequenas certezas won the Maria Teresa Leon International Prize, making her the first Mexican writer to win this honour. Pequenas certezas was produced in Mexico City in 2007 and was also performed in English at the Royal Court Theatre in London in 2006. The translation titled Little Certainties was done by William Gregory. In 2012, the Austin Latino Theatre Alliance produced her play Cuerdas. And in 2018, Ropes was premiered in New York, by the director Lisa Rothe in the Two River Theater. In 2017, she was honored with the most prestigious literary prize in México "Juan Ruiz de Alarcón" for her achievements in playwriting.

There have been more than 50 premieres of her plays around the world including two (one in English and one in Spanish) at the University of Nevada, Reno.
