= Ramón Xirau =

Mexican poet and philosopher (1924–2017)

Ramón Xirau Subías
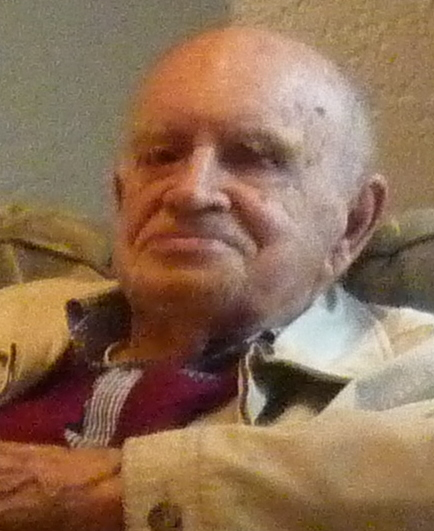
- Xirau in 2011
- Born: 20 January 1924; Barcelona, Spain
- Died: 26 July 2017 (aged 93)

Philosophical work
- School: Existentialism
- Main interests: Metaphysics, epistemology, ethics, time, phenomenology, ontology

Ramón Xirau Subías (Spanish: [raˈmon ʃiˈɾaw], Catalan: [rəˈmoɲ ʃiˈɾaw]; 20 January 1924 – 26 July 2017) was a Catalan-born Mexican poet, philosopher and literary critic.

In 1939, as the Spanish Civil War was coming to an end, Xirau emigrated to Mexico where he obtained Mexican citizenship in 1955. He obtained a Master's Degree in philosophy at the National Autonomous University of Mexico (UNAM) and an honorary doctorate from the Universidad de las Américas. He was a research faculty member of the UNAM y and the National System of Researchers. At the UNAM he taught at the Faculty of Philosophy and Literature since 1949 and did research at the Institute of Philologic Research since 1973. He founded and directed the Diálogos magazine between 1964 and 1986.

Professor Xirau is mostly known in the English speaking world as the co-author of The Nature of Man along with Erich Fromm (Macmillan 1968, ISBN 0-02-084960-5).

== Awards and honors ==
In 1995 Xirau was awarded the National Prize for Arts and Sciences in the History, Social Sciences and Philosophy category, and the Fine Arts Medal (Spanish: Medalla Buenas Artes) in 2009.

He was a member of the Colegio Nacional since 1973 and of the Academia Mexicana de la Lengua since 1994. Xirau received the Legion of Honour from France in 1991 and the Isabel la Católica from Spain awards as well as the Creu de Sant Jordi from the Generalitat of Catalonia for his works in essay and academics in Spanish and Catalan literature. He also received the Elías Sourasky and the Premio Universidad Nacional awards at the UNAM.

He received honorary PhDs from the Universidad de las Américas (1979), the Autonomous University of Barcelona (1984) and UNAM (1993)

== Selected works ==
- Palabra y Silencio, Siglo XXI (1968) ISBN 968-231-887-4
- Tiempo Vivido: Acerca de Estar, Siglo XXI (1985) ISBN 968-231-888-2
- Entre la Poesía y el Conocimiento: Antología de Ensayos Críticos Sobre Poetas y Poesía Iberoamericanos, Fondo de Cultura Económica (2004) ISBN 968-16-6444-2
- Introducción a la Historia de la Filsofía, UNAM (2009) ISBN 968-368-036-4
- Genio y Figura de Sor Juana Inés de la Cruz (Tercera edición), El Colegio Nacional (2019) ISBN 978-607-724-320-5
