= Carlos Montemayor =

Mexican writer, literary critic, tenor and political analyst (1947–2010)

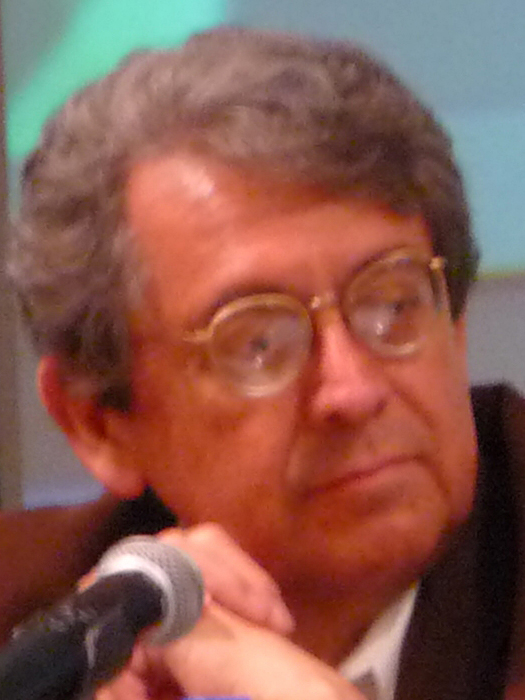
- Born: June 13, 1947; Parral, Chihuahua
- Died: February 28, 2010 (aged 62); Mexico City
- Alma mater: National Autonomous University of Mexico
- Occupations: Novelist; Poet; Storyteller; Translator; Essayist; Tenor
- Writing career
- Language: Spanish
- Notable works: Las llaves de Urgell; Guerra en el Paraíso
- Notable awards: Xavier Villaurrutia Award (1971); National Prize for Arts (2009)

Carlos Montemayor (June 13, 1947 – February 28, 2010) was a Mexican novelist, poet, essayist, literary critic, tenor, political analyst, and promoter of contemporary literature written in indigenous languages. He was a Member of the Mexican Academy of the Language.

Montemayor was born in Parral, Chihuahua. He died of stomach cancer on February 28, 2010, in Mexico City. He co-wrote with Sergio Olhovich the original script for 1938: When Mexico Recovered Its Oil, which was released in 2025.

== Awards and honors ==
- Xavier Villaurrutia Award, for Las llaves de Urgell (1971).
- Alfonso X Award for Literary Translation (1989).
- José Fuentes Mares National Prize for Literature for his poetry book Abril y otras estaciones (1990).
- Juan Rulfo Award by Radio France Internationale, for his short story Operativo en el trópico (1994).
- Colima Fine Arts Award for Published Narrative, for his novel Guerra en el Paraíso (1991).
- Member of the Academia Mexicana de la Lengua, since March 14, 1985. His chair was number XX.
- Roque Dalton Medal (2003).
- Honorary doctorate by the Universidad Autónoma Metropolitana in 1995 and by the Universidad Autónoma de Chihuahua in 2009.
- National Prize for Arts in the Linguistics and literature category (2009).
- A statue of Montemayor was erected in Parral, Chihuahua's main square in 2021.

== Works ==
=== Novel ===
- Mal de piedra (Blood relations, 1980)
- Minas del retorno (Gambusino, 1982)
- Guerra en el paraíso (1997)
- Los informes secretos (1999)
- Las armas del alba (2003)
- La fuga (2007)

=== Narrative ===
- Las llaves de Urgell (1971)
- El alba y otros cuentos (1986)
- Operativo en el trópico (1994)
- Cuentos gnósticos (1997)
- La tormenta y otras historias (1999)

=== Poetry ===
- Las armas del viento (1977)
- Abril y otros poemas (1979)
- Finisterra (Finisterra and other poems, 1982)
- Abril y otras estaciones (1989)
- Poesía (1977–1996) (1997)
- Antología personal (2001)
- Apuntes del exilio (2010)
