= Ignacio Solares =

Mexican novelist, editor and playwright (1945–2023)

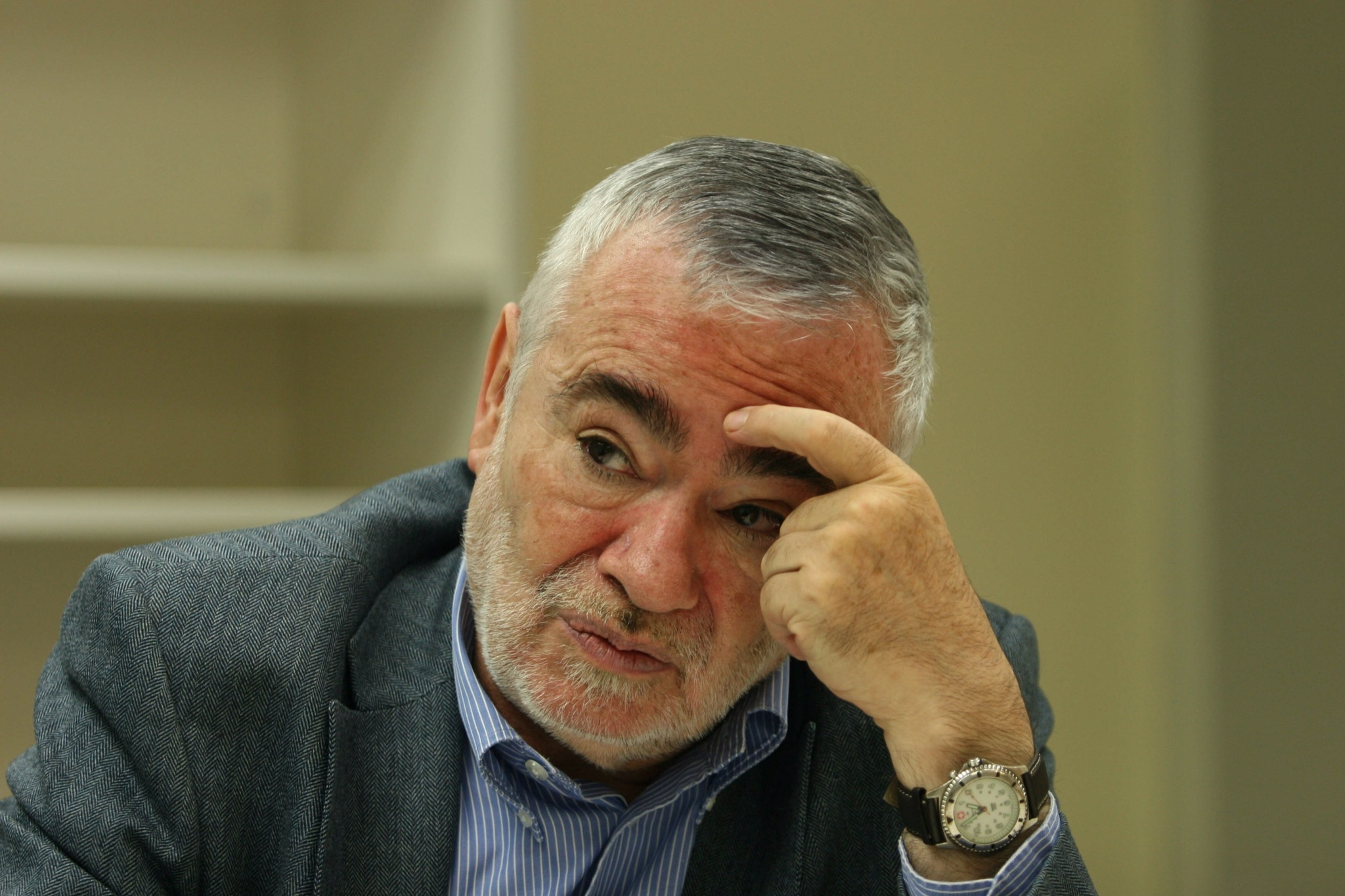
- Solares in 2012
- Born: 15 January 1945; Ciudad Juárez, Chihuahua
- Died: 24 August 2023 (aged 78); Mexico City

Ignacio Solares Bernal (15 January 1945 – 24 August 2023) was a Mexican novelist, editor and playwright, whose novel La invasión (The Invasion, 2004) was a bestseller in Mexico and Spain. Until 2005 he served as the Coordinator of Cultural Activities for Literature and Arts at the National Autonomous University of Mexico (UNAM); he was a faculty member there and directed the cultural magazine Revista de la Universidad de México. He formerly served as director of the Department of Theater and Dance and the Division of Literature at UNAM. He also edited the cultural supplement to the weekly magazine Siempre!.

Solares is known for mystical occurrences and "dislocations of reality" in his fiction. In Anónimo (Anonymous Note, 1979), a work that has been compared to Kafka's "The Metamorphosis" for its protagonist’s metamorphosis into another person, we see Solares’ rejection of much organized religion (especially the Roman Catholic Church), but his simultaneous search for the transcendent and religious on the borders of human experience. He has written, "I believe in every possible manifestation of spiritual strangeness. I believe in all possible escapes. The only thing I cannot endure is reality, whatever it may be. I believe that the writer is defined by the constant necessity of creating a world, to depart from this world. Literature is more concerned with misery than with happiness. Writing is directly related to frustration. It is a reflection of personal desperation. The writer is profoundly disgusted with his reality."

== Life and career ==
Ignacio Solares was born on 15 January 1945 in Ciudad Juárez, Chihuahua, but much of his fiction is set in Mexico City. Casas de encantamiento (Houses of Enchantment, 1987), which won the Novedades prize in 1988, tries to capture Mexico City through time. He has written a number of historical novels over the years, beginning with Madero, el otro (Madero's Judgment, 1989), and including La invasión. The latter, though it vividly describes the grim reality of the United States' invasion of Mexico and occupation of Mexico City in 1847, during the Mexican–American War, focuses on the protagonist's personal relationships during and many years after the invasion. Columbus (1996), on the other hand, deals with Pancho Villa's invasion of the United States. Nen, la inútil (Nen the Useless, 1994) is concerned with the advent of the Conquistadores into Precolumbian America; Nen is an Aztec girl who is raped by a Spanish soldier.

The essays in Cartas a una joven psicóloga (Letters to a Young Psychologist, 2000) and the play La moneda de oro ¿Freud o Jung? (The Golden Coin, Freud or Jung? 2004) reflect Solares' interest in psychotherapy.

Solares' Delirium tremens (1979, published in English in 2000 as Delirium Tremens: Stories of Suffering and Transcendence) is a work of non-fiction that collects stories of nightmarish visions experienced by alcoholics when undergoing delirium tremens. It is both a penetrating study of addiction, and a harrowing study of descents into personal hells. Solares' father had experienced delirium tremens when Solares was a boy.

Eladio Cortés, in his Dictionary of Mexican Literature, has written that "Solares' novels have the simplicity of a fairy tale and the complexity of a metaphysical treatise. The author's ability to capture and hold the reader's interest is one of his main assets. He is one of contemporary Mexico’s best novelists."

Ignacio Solares died in Mexico City on 24 August 2023, at the age of 78.

== Published works ==
The following are novels, unless otherwise specified.

- El hombre habitado (The Inhabited Man, short stories). Samo, 1975
- Puerta del cielo (Door of Heaven). Grijalbo, 1976
- Anónimo (Anonymous Note). Compañía General de Ediciones, 1979
- Delirium tremens (non-fiction). Compañía General de Ediciones, 1979; Planeta 1992 y 1999. Translated as Delirium Tremens. Stories of Suffering and Transcendence (2000).
- El árbol del deseo (The Tree of Desire). Compañía General de Ediciones, 1980
- La fórmula de la inmortalidad (The Formula for Immortality). Compañía General de Ediciones, 1983
- El problema es otro (This Is Not the Problem, play). UAEM, 1984
- Serafín. Diana, 1985
- Casas de encantamiento (Houses of Enchantment). Plaza y Valdés/INBA/SEP/DDF/UAM, 1987
- Madero el otro. Joaquín Mortiz, 1989. Translated as Madero’s Judgment (1999).
- La noche de Ángeles (The Night of Ángeles). Diana, 1991; Planeta, Grandes novelas de la historia mexicana, 2004
- El jefe máximo (The Greatest Chief, play). UNAM, Serie la Carpa, 1991
- El gran elector (novella). Joaquín Mortiz, 1993. Translated as The Great Mexican Electoral Game (1999).
- Nen la inútil (Nen the Useless). Alfaguara, 1994
- Muérete y sabrás (short stories). Joaquín Mortiz, Serie del Volador, 1995
- Columbus. Alfaguara, 1996; Punto de Lectura, 2002
- Teatro histórico (Historical Theater, play). UNAM, 1996
- Cartas a una joven psicóloga (Letters to a Young Psychologist, essays). Alfaguara, Serie Circular, 2000
- El espía del aire (The Spy in the Sky). Alfaguara, 2001
- Imagen de Julio Cortázar (The Image of Julio Cortázar, essays). UNAM / FCE / UdeG, Biblioteca Cortázar, 2002.
- No hay tal lugar (There Is No Such Place). Alfaguara, 2003
- El sitio (The Site). Alfaguara, 1998; Punto de Lectura, 2004
- La moneda de oro ¿Freud o Jung? (The Golden Coin, Freud or Jung? play). Ediciones del Ermitaño, Minimalia, 2004.
- La invasion (The Invasion). Alfaguara, 2004
- La instrucción y otros cuentos (The instruction and other tales). Alfaguara, 2007.
- Cartas a un joven sin Dios (Letters to a young fellow without God). Alfaguara, 2008.
- Ficciones de la Revolución Mexicana (Mexican Revolution's Fictions). Alfaguara, 2009.

== Other publications and collaborations ==
- I.S. de cuerpo entero (I.S. complete). Autobiographic essay. Ediciones Corunda/UNAM, 1990.
- Los mártires y otras historias (Martyrs and other stories). Three short novels. Los mártires, Serafín y El árbol del deseo (Martyrs, Serafin and Tree of Desire). Fondo de Cultura Económica 1997.
- Tríptico de Guerra (War Triptych). Play. Si buscas la paz, prepárate para la guerra. (If peace is what you are looking for, be prepared for war). Textos de Difusión Cultural, Dirección de Literatura, UNAM 2002.
- Luis Cernuda y la suprarrealidad del deseo (Luis Cernuda and the above reality desire). Essay. Colección Cátedra Luis Cernuda. UNAM/Universidad de Sevilla/Grupo Santander, México, 2006.Textos de Difusión Cultural, Dirección de Literatura, UNAM 2002.
- Ignacio Solares para jóvenes (Ignacio Solares for young). Fragments. Instituto Chihuahuense de la Cultura, Gobierno del Estado de Chihuahua, 2007.
- Voz viva. Ignacio Solares. La invasión y otros textos (Live voice. Ignacio Solares. The invasion and other fragments). Audio. Coordinación de Difusión Cultural, UNAM, 2009.
- Entre voces: Martín Luis Guzmán. Muertes históricas. Con la voz de Ignacio Solares (Between voices: Martin Luis Guzmán. Historic deaths. Voice: Ignacio Solares). Audio. Fondo de Cultura Económica 1998.
- Hagas lo que Hagas. Aldous Huxley. (Whatever you do). Prólogo. Textos de Difusión Cultural, UNAM, 2007.
- Autobiografía. San Ignacio de Loyola. (Autobiography). Introducción. Colección Licenciado Vidriera, Textos de Difusión Cultural, UNAM, 2007.
- Una fábula. Christopher Isherwood. (A fable). Introducción. Textos de Difusión Cultural, UNAM, 2009.

== Books Translated into English ==
- Yankee Invasion: A Novel of Mexico City. Translated by Timothy G. Compton. Scarletta Press 2009. ISBN 9780979824944
- Lost in the City: Tree of Desire & Serafin. Two novels by Ignacio Solares. Translated by Carolyn & John Brushwood. University of Texas Press, 1998. ISBN 9780292777316
- The Great Mexican Electoral Game. Translated by Alfonso González. York Press Ltd. 1999. ISBN 9781896761152
- Madero’s Judgment. Translated by Alfonso González and Juana Wong. York Press Ltd. 1999. ISBN 9781896761176
- Delirium Tremens. Stories of Suffering and Transcendence. Translated by Timothy G. Compton. Hazelden 2000. ISBN 9781568385181
- There Is No Such Place. Translated by Timothy G. Compton. Authorhouse 2008. ISBN 9781434371850
- The golden coin : Freud or Jung? Translated by Timothy G. Compton. Ediciones del Ermitaño, 2004. ISBN 9789685473507
