= Quatro =

Quatro may refer to:

- Cuatro (instrument) (or Quatro), a musical instrument
- Éramos Quatro, the seventh album of the Brazilian rock band Raimundos
- Lego Quatro, a Lego theme designed for very young children
- Mike Quatro, musician and independent entertainment executive
- Nvidia Quadro, a model of video card by nVidia
- Quatro (album), a 1974 album by Suzi Quatro
- Quatro (drink), a soft drink brand line by the Coca-Cola Company
- Quatro Ciàcoe, a monthly periodical in Venetian language, established in 1981
- Suzi Quatro (born 1950), major rock star, actor, and radio researcher/presenter
- Suzi Quatro (album), Suzi Quatro's 1973 debut album
- ¡Cuatro!, a documentary by rock band Green Day, promoted as ¡Quatro!
- Quatro, the Prince Charming character in the movie Snow White and the Three Stooges

== See also ==
- Cuatro (disambiguation)
- Quattro (disambiguation)
- Quarto (disambiguation)
- Cuarto (disambiguation)
