= Quarto (disambiguation) =

A quarto is a book whose production entails printing 4 (generally non-consecutive) pages per impression.

- Early quarto texts of Shakespeare's works:
  - Folios and Quartos
  - Bad quarto
- Quarto Group, a London-based publishing house
- Quarto, a traditional British paper size

== Places of Italy ==
- Municipalities in respective provinces:
  - Quarto, Campania, in Naples
  - Quarto d'Altino, in Treviso
  - Quartu Sant'Elena, in Cagliari
  - Quarto Cagnino, in Milan
- Quarters in respective cities:

- Quarto Oggiaro, in Milan
- Quarto dei Mille, in Genoa

- Hamlets:
  - Quarto d'Asti, in Asti (AT)

- Quarto Chilometro, in Colleferro (RM)

== Science and technology ==
- Quarto (software), free and open-source scientific and technical publishing system

== Other ==
- Quarto (board game)
- Quarto (Gibraltar), obsolete coin with value of 1/24 Gibraltarian real
- Italian cruiser Quarto, an Italian scout cruiser

== See also ==
- Cuarto (disambiguation)
- Quatro (disambiguation)
- Cuatro (disambiguation)
- Quattro (disambiguation)
