= Eduardo Montagner Anguiano =

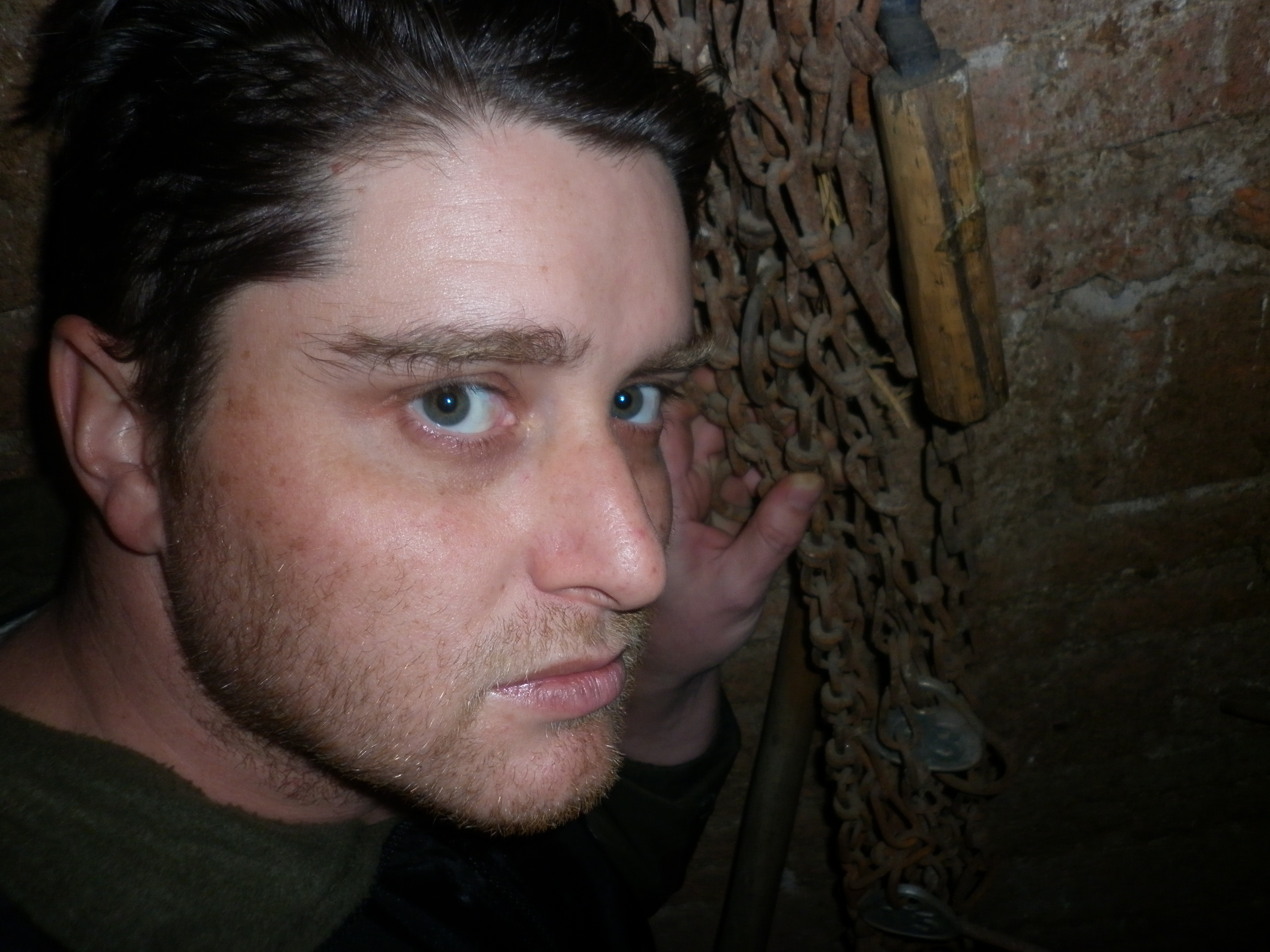
Eduardo Montagner Anguiano

Eduardo Montagner Anguiano (Note: In this Hispanic American name, the first or paternal surname is Montagner and the second or maternal family name is Anguiano.) (born 12 May 1975) is a Chipilo Venetian writer, born in Chipilo, Puebla, Mexico, in an Italian immigrant family. He studied linguistics and Spanish Language (Letras hispánicas) at Puebla Autonomous University (BUAP). He is a translator, poet, novelist and protector of minority languages in Mexico, principally a Chipileño language.

== Biography ==
He was born in Chipilo, Puebla, on May 12, 1975. He is a grandson of Venetian immigrants from Segusino, Italy, who arrived in Mexico in 1882 and founded a farm colony named Chipilo de Francisco Xavier Mina, near the city of city of Puebla. He spoke a Venetian language since his childhood with Spanish language.

He studied linguistics and Spanish Language at Puebla Autonomous University, was the first academic contact as writer and poet.

== Books ==
- Parlar par véneto, víver a Mésico (2005, Conaculta).
- Al prim (2006, Conaculta/Secretaría de Cultura de Puebla).
- Toda esa gran verdad (2006, Alfaguara / 2008, Punto de Lectura).
- Ancora fon ora (2010, Conaculta/Secretaría de Cultura de Puebla).

== Awards ==
- 2005, Concorso Letterario Internazionale in Lingua Veneta Mario Donadoni.

== See also ==
- Italian Mexicans
