= Judeo-Venetian dialect =

Dialect spoken by the Jewish community of Venice

Judeo-Venetian
- Giudeo-Veneziano
- Region: Venice
- Ethnicity: Venetian Jews
- Extinct: 20th century
- Language family: Indo-European: Italic; Latino-Faliscan; Latinic; Romance; Italo-Western; (disputed); Venetian; Judeo-Venetian
- Writing system: Hebrew Alphabet, Latin Alphabet

Language codes
- ISO 639-3: –
- Glottolog: None
- Linguasphere: 51-AAB-be

Judeo-Venetian, also known as Giudeo-Veneziano, was a dialect of the Venetian language spoken by the Jewish community of Venice.

== History ==
Judeo-Venetian was formed as Jews in Venice began speaking their own Venetian dialect due to isolation from the general populace in the Venetian ghetto and influence from Hebrew. The language became extinct at some point in the 20th century.

== Features ==
Judeo Venetian was relatively similar to wider Venetian but did contain minor morphology differences. The 1st-person plural possessive pronoun is mie, not me. The 2nd- and 3rd-person singular endings match.

There was, however, a more significant difference in lexicon. Judeo-Venetian preserved archaisms and included Hebrew and Ladino loanwords.

Judeo Venetian	Judeo-Spanish	Hebrew	English
Zè meio lassarlo perder, nunca per lù	nunca per lù!’; No staghe badar, el zé un camèa	N/A	Don’t bother, he is a big liar
cól ʿorèr leminò	N/A	כל ערב למינו	every raven after his kind
Adonài sefatài tiftàh	N/A	אדני שפתי תפתח	Oh my goodness/he/she has cracked all the eggs

== Sample text ==
Judeo-Venetian	English
Gò magnà i menusami de oca, boni, ma i me zè restai sul stomego	I have eaten goose giblets, tasty, but they remained on my stomach
