= Fiuman dialect =

Venetian dialect of Rijeka, Croatia

Fiuman
- fiuman
- Native to: Croatia, Italy
- Region: Kvarner Gulf
- Native speakers: (undated figure of between 10,000 and 30,000)
- Language family: Indo-European: Italic; Latino-Faliscan; Latin; Romance; Italo-Western; Western Romance; (unclassified); Venetian; Fiuman

Language codes
- ISO 639-3: –
- Glottolog: None
- IETF: vec-HR

The Fiuman dialect (Italian: fiumano, Fiuman: fiuman) is the dialect of the Venetian language spoken in the Croatian city of Rijeka (Fiume). It is strongly influenced by Italian, Hungarian, German substrates, mainly due to the closeness between two different cultures (the Romanic and Hungarian/German ones) and Austro-Hungarian rule.

Thus, because Rijeka was under the Habsburg monarchy for over five centuries (1466–1918) and part of the Holy Roman Empire for nine centuries, many of the words are of German and Hungarian origin. Due to extensive emigration to the growing port city during the late 18th and 19th centuries, many words also came from other languages, such as Slovenian.

Significant is the amount of literary production carried out in this small dialect, with some of the main local authors using it in their works being Mario Schittar, Gino Antoni, Oscarre Russi, Egidio Milinovich.

== Origin and use ==
Experts say about this dialect: "(...) the Croatian language and a variant of the Venetian language certainly coexisted in the city as early as the fifteenth century (...), but taking into account all the historical facts, i.e. that in the ninth and tenth century Venetian merchants, sailors and statesmen on the eastern Adriatic coast already spoke Venetian, the latter was probably spoken even earlier."

"Whether the Fiuman dialect is fundamentally a continuation of the language of the autochthonous Romance population with a subsequent stratification of Venetisms or whether its basis is a specific mix of the various Italian dialects of the Italian settlers from the thirteenth century onwards with a later gradual Venetian stratification, it coexisted in Rijeka with the Croats' Chakavian dialect for centuries."

The Fiuman pedagogist Gemma Harasim wrote in 1909: "the Italian language (i.e. Fiuman) is equally understood by almost all of the inhabitants: especially by the Croats, many of whom, in fact, speak it at home and in social life, despite being politically opposed to Italians; Italian is also spoken, although somewhat less well and with a thick exotic accent, by almost all of the Hungarians who come to live here. Therefore the Italian language certainly remains the common language of all nationalities: in peaceful business relations, in conversations and in families, it is almost a general rule that when Hungarians, Croats and Italians meet, the language of exchange remains Italian."

Because the great majority of Italians left the city after the Second World War (Istrian–Dalmatian exodus), Fiuman is now reduced to a minority language, spoken by 2-5% of Rijeka's population.

== Examples ==
| Fiuman | Italian | Croatian |
|---|---|---|
| (...) El mar inveze el xe movimento, alegria. Ogni stagion, ogni ora del giorno el cambia, el ga un altro color, un altro odor. Non so se anca a voi la aqua dolze la ve fà sto efeto. Mi ancora ogi, non magno pessi de aqua dolze. Solo qualche volta un tochetin de salmon fumigado, de quel color rosa, sul pan nero con un poco de butiro. | (...) Il mare invece è movimento, allegria. Ad ogni stagione, ad ogni ora del giorno, cambia, ha un altro colore, un altro odore. Non so se anche a voi l’acqua dolce faccia questo effetto. Io ancor oggi, non mangio pesci d’acqua dolce. Solo qualche volta un pezzettino di salmone affumicato, di quel color rosa, sul pane nero con un po’ di burro. | (...) More je pak pokret, veselje. U svako doba godine, svakim satom u danu, mijenja se, poprima drugu boju, drugi miris. Ne znam ima li i na vas slatka voda isti učinak. Ja dan danas ne jedem slatkovodne ribe. Samo koji put koji komadić dimljenog lososa, one ružičaste boje, na crnom kruhu, s malo maslaca. |
| Mi son nato a Fiume, in una sofita in via Ciotta numero uno, visavì del Teatro Fenice intel famoso inverno più fredo del secolo (i diseva) 1928/29, con tanta neve, e - de muleto e disemo cussì de giovinoto – go visto come tuti noi a Fiume, robe che le xe oramai storia antica o squasi. | Io sono nato a Fiume, in una soffitta in via Ciotta numero uno, di fronte al Teatro Fenice, nel famoso inverno più freddo del secolo (dicevano) 1928/29, con tanta neve e – da ragazzino e diciamo, così, da giovanotto - ho visto, come tutti noi a Fiume, cose che sono oramai storia antica o quasi. | Ja sam rođen u Rijeci, na tavanu u Ciottinoj ulici broj jedan, nasuprot Teatra Fenice, u famoznoj najhladnijoj zimi stoljeća (tako su govorili) 1928./29., uz mnogo snijega, te sam - kao mališan i recimo, tako, kao mladić - vidio, kao i svi mi u Rijeci, stvari koje su već drevna povijest ili skoro. |
