= Paduan dialect =

Extinct Venetian dialect

Paduan
- pavano
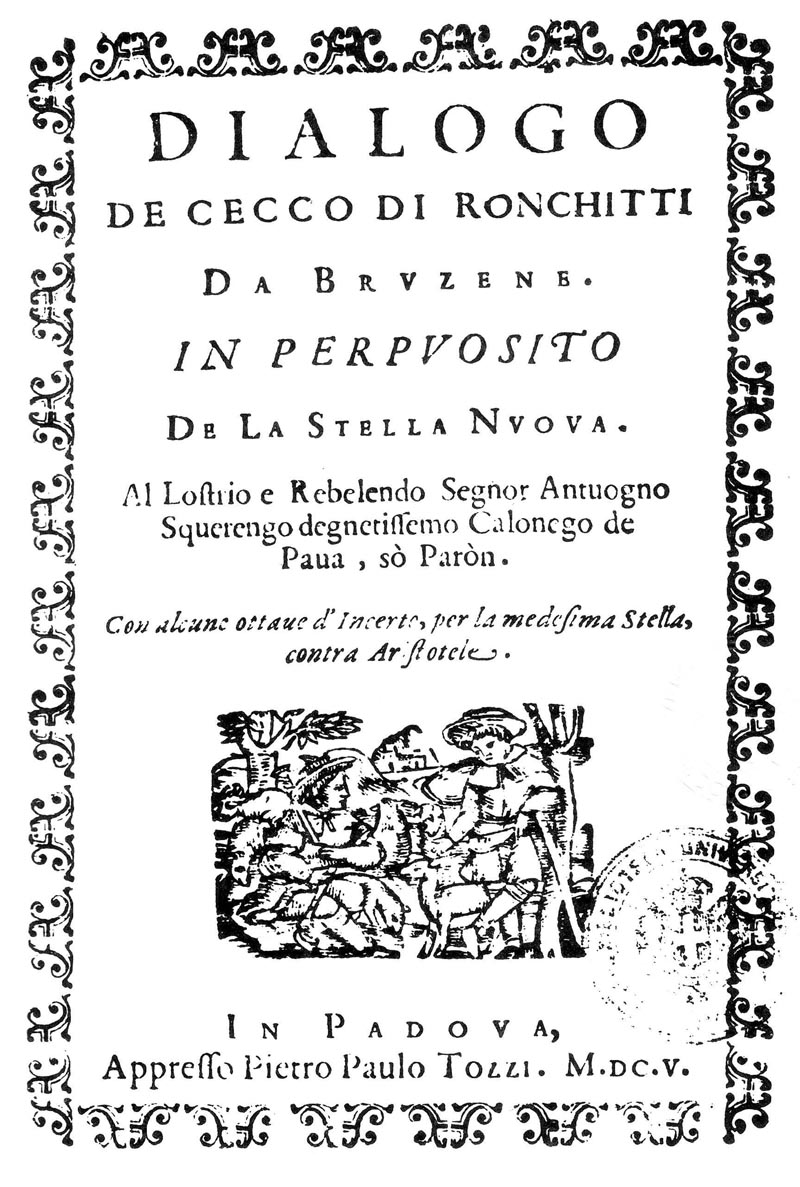
- The title page of the Dialogo de Cecco di Ronchitti da Bruzene in perpuosito de la stella Nuova, which uses the Paduan dialect.
- Native to: Republic of Venice
- Region: Padua and surrounding areas
- Ethnicity: Paduans
- Era: 14–17th centuries
- Language family: Indo-European: Italic; Latino-Faliscan; Latin; Romance; Italo-Western; (unclassified); Venetian; Paduan
- Writing system: Latin

Language codes
- ISO 639-3: –
- Glottolog: None

Paduan is an extinct variant of Venetian that was once spoken in the countryside of Padua from about the 14th to the 17th centuries AD.

The present-day Central Venetian dialects, influenced by Venetian proper, retain very few traces of Paduan. However, it played a fundamental role in the flourishing of Paduan literature comprising numerous works with humorous themes, both in verse and prose, composed between the 14th and 17th centuries. The first authors to write in Paduan were Nicolò de' Rossi (1308–1309) and Marsilio da Carrara, but the greatest exponent of this current was Angelo Beolco, better known as Ruzante (16th century), who was followed throughout the 17th century by a series of his imitators. Galileo Galilei also wrote, in whole or in part and under a pseudonym, a pamphlet in Paduan named the Dialogo de Cecco di Ronchitti da Bruzene in perpuosito de la stella Nuova.

== Characteristics ==
The most typical feature of Paduan was the extensive use of Metaphony, with the transformation of /e/ e /o/ into /i/: péro "pear" in the plural becomes pìri pómo "apple" in the plural becomes "pùmi". A similar phenomenon occurs in open vowels, which are diphthongised: zucòlo zucchino "courgette" in the plural is "zucuòli".

The Latin suffixes -"atu" and -"ate" are rendered with -"ò" and -"è" : parentò parentado "relative", amistò amicizia "friendship". This phenomenon was recalled and condemned by Dante Alighieri in De vulgari eloquentia.

It is also worth remembering the first person plural of the present indicative in -"ón" or -"óm" (favelóm "let's talk"), later replaced by the form in -"émo" of Venetian origin ("favelémo").

== Bibliography ==
- Antichi testi di letteratura pavana, pubblicati da Emilio Lovarini, Bologna, Romagnoli Dall'Acqua, 1894.
- Emilio Lovarini, Studi sul Ruzzante e la letteratura pavana, a cura di Gianfranco Folena, Padova, Antenore, 1965.
- Ivano Paccagnella, Vocabolario del pavano (XIV-XVII secolo), Padova, Esedra, 2012.
- Pavano entry (in Italian) in the Enciclopedia Treccani
- Flavia Ursini (2011). "Dialetti veneti". In Treccani (ed.). Enciclopedia dell'Italiano (in Italian).
