= Audi e-tron Quattro =

Audi e-tron Quattro may refer to:

- Audi R18 e-tron Quattro, prototype-class racer, see Audi R18
- Audi e-tron Quattro concept car, see Audi e-tron
- Audi e-tron Quattro production car, see Audi Q8 e-tron

== See also ==
- Audi Quattro
- Audi e-tron
- Audi
- Quattro (disambiguation)
