= Venetian language =

Romance language of Veneto, northeast Italy

Venetian
- łengoa/łengua vèneta, vèneto
- Native to: Italy, Slovenia, Croatia, Montenegro
- Region: Veneto; Friuli-Venezia Giulia; Trentino; Istria County; Primorje-Gorski Kotar; Slovene Istria
- Native speakers: 3.9 million (2002)
- Language family: Indo-European: Italic; Latino-Faliscan; Latinic; Romance; Italo-Western; (disputed); Venetian
- Dialects: Chiplo; Fiuman; Paduan†; Talian; Judeo-Venetian†; Triestine; Corfiot

Official status
- Recognised minority language in: Italy; → Veneto; Brazil (Talian dialect); → São Paulo; → Rio Grande do Sul; → Santa Catarina; → Paraná; → Espírito Santo; Mexico (Chipilo); → Querétaro; → Veracruz; → Puebla

Language codes
- ISO 639-3: vec
- Glottolog: vene1258
- Linguasphere: 51-AAA-n
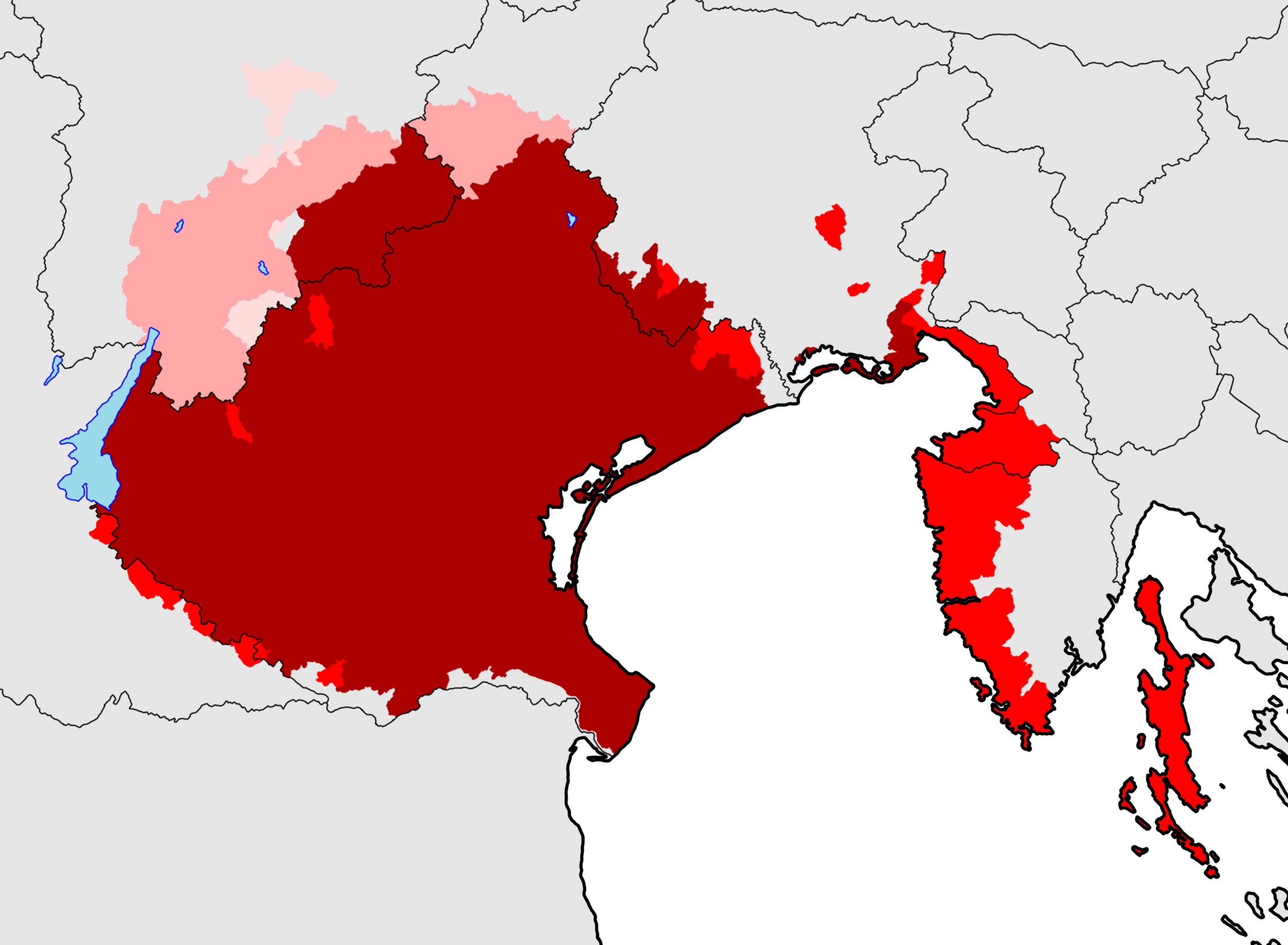
- Venetian language distribution in Triveneto: Areas where Venetian is spoken Areas where Venetian is spoken alongside other languages (Bavarian, Emilian, Friulian, Slovene, Chakavian, Istriot and formerly Dalmatian) and areas of linguistic transition (with Lombard and with Emilian) Areas of influence of Venetian (over Lombard and over Ladin)

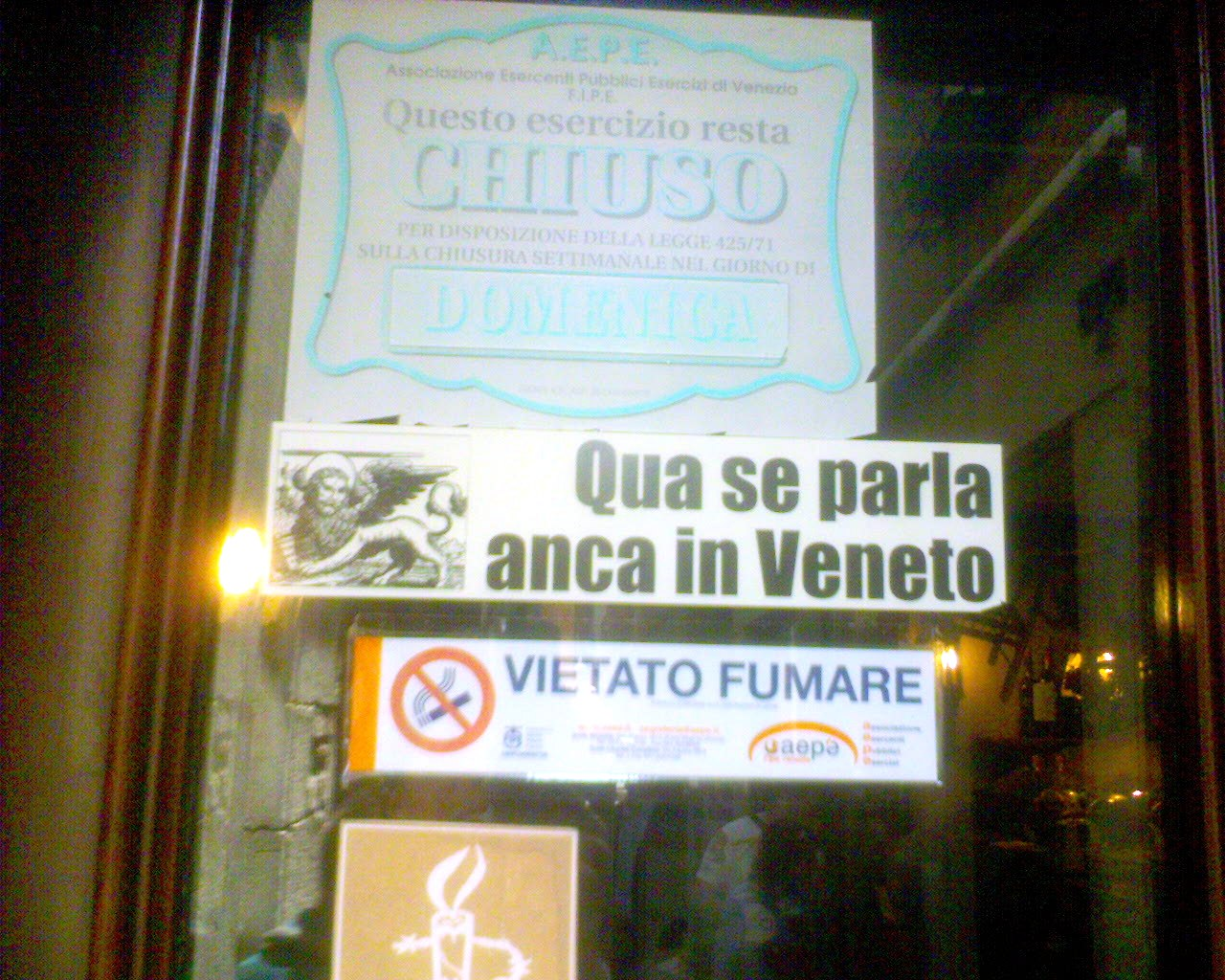
A sign in Venetian reading "Here Venetian is also spoken"

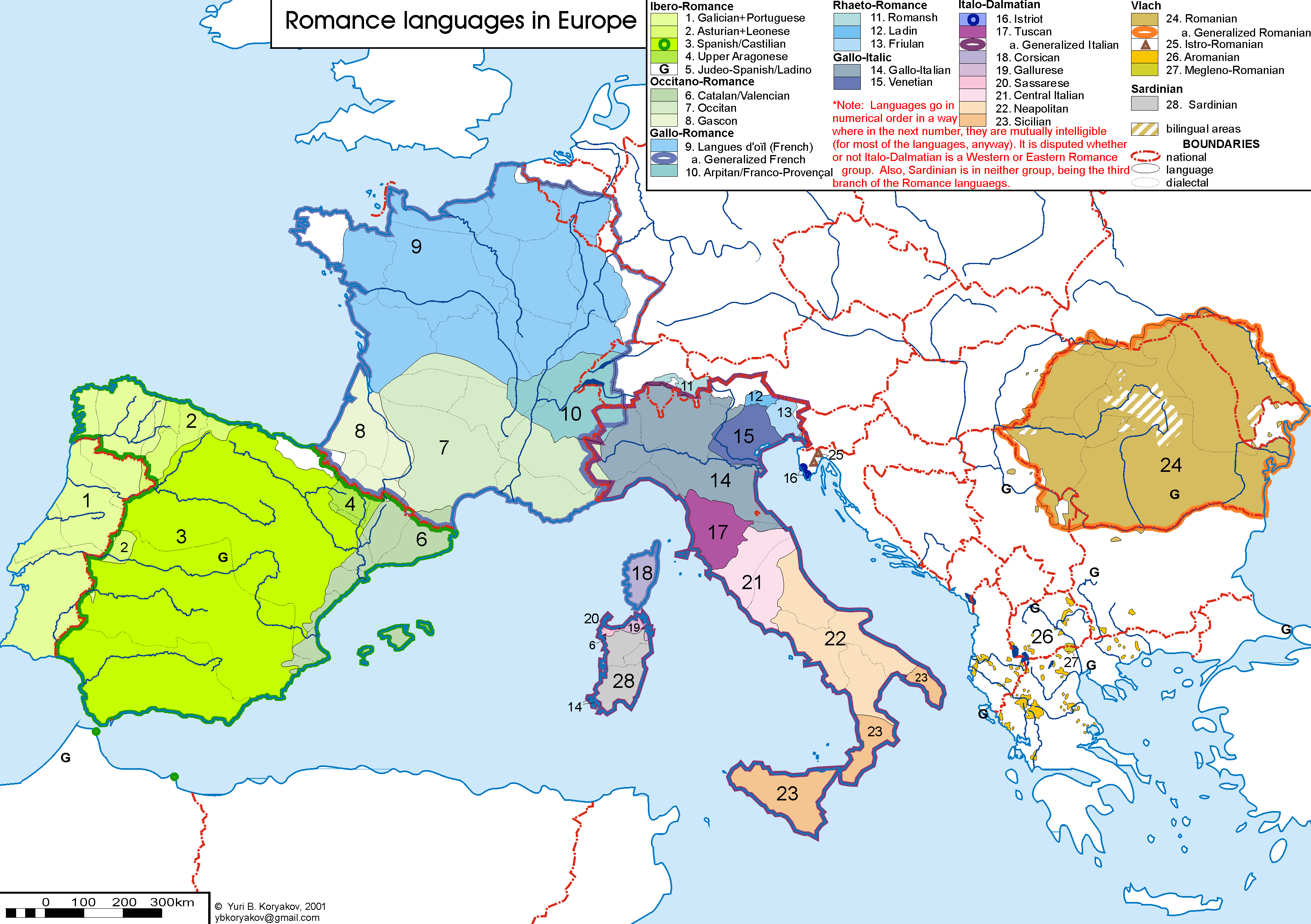
The distribution of Romance languages in Europe. Venetian is number 15.

Venetian, also known as wider Venetian or Venetan (łengua vèneta [ˈ(l)eŋɡwa ˈvɛneta]) or vèneto [ˈvɛneto]), is a Romance language spoken natively in the northeast of Italy, mostly in Veneto, where most of the five million inhabitants can understand it. It is sometimes spoken and often well understood outside Veneto: in Trentino, Friuli, the Julian March, Istria, and some towns of Slovenia, Dalmatia (Croatia) and the Bay of Kotor (Montenegro) by a surviving indigenous Venetian population, and in Argentina, Australia, Brazil, Canada, Mexico, the United States and the United Kingdom by Venetians in the diaspora.

Although referred to as an "Italian dialect" (Venetian: diałeto; Italian: dialetto) even by some of its speakers, the label is primarily political, referring to geography and not linguistics. In the realm of linguistics, Venetian is often considered a separate language from Italian, with its own local varieties. Its precise place within the Romance language family remains somewhat controversial however. While Ethnologue groups it into the Gallo-Italic branch (and thus, closer to French and Emilian–Romagnol than to Italian), Glottolog places it in its Dalmatian Romance branch alongside Dalmatian and Istriot. Devoto, Avolio and Ursini reject such classification, and Tagliavini places it in the Italo-Dalmatian branch of Romance.

== History ==
Like all members of the Romance language family, Venetian evolved from Vulgar Latin, and is thus a sister language of Italian and other Romance languages. Venetian is first attested in writing in the 13th century.

The language enjoyed substantial prestige in the days of the Republic of Venice, when it attained the status of a lingua franca in the Mediterranean Sea. Notable Venetian-language authors include the playwrights Ruzante (c. 1496–1542), Carlo Goldoni (1707–1793) and Carlo Gozzi (1720–1806). Following the old Italian theatre tradition (commedia dell'arte), they used Venetian in their comedies as the speech of the common folk. They are ranked among the foremost Italian theatrical authors of all time, and plays by Goldoni and Gozzi are still performed today all over the world.

Other notable works in Venetian are the translations of the Iliad by Giacomo Casanova (1725–1798) and Francesco Boaretti, the translation of the Divine Comedy (1875) by Giuseppe Cappelli, and the poems of Biagio Marin (1891–1985). Notable too is a manuscript titled Dialogo de Cecco di Ronchitti da Bruzene in perpuosito de la stella Nuova attributed to Girolamo Spinelli, perhaps with some supervision by Galileo Galilei for scientific details.

Several Venetian–Italian dictionaries are available in print and online, including those by Boerio, Contarini, Nazari and Piccio.

As a literary language, Venetian was overshadowed by Dante Alighieri's Tuscan dialect (the best known writers of the Renaissance, such as Petrarch, Boccaccio and Machiavelli, were Tuscan and wrote in the Tuscan language) and languages of France like the Occitano-Romance languages and the langues d'oïl including the mixed Franco-Venetian.

Even before the demise of the Republic, Venetian gradually ceased to be used for administrative purposes in favor of the Tuscan-derived Italian language that had been proposed and used as a vehicle for a common Italian culture, strongly supported by eminent Venetian humanists and poets, from Pietro Bembo (1470–1547), a crucial figure in the development of the Italian language itself, to Ugo Foscolo (1778–1827).

Venetian spread to other continents as a result of mass migration from the Veneto region between 1870 and 1905, and between 1945 and 1960. Venetian migrants created large Venetian-speaking communities in Argentina, Brazil (see Talian), and Mexico (see Chipilo Venetian dialect), where the language is still spoken today.

In the 19th century, large-scale immigration towards Trieste and Muggia extended the presence of the Venetian language eastward. Previously, the dialect of Trieste had been a Rhaeto-Romance dialect known as Tergestino. This dialect became extinct as a result of Venetian migration, which gave rise to the Triestino dialect of Venetian spoken there today.

Internal migrations during the 20th century also saw many Venetian-speakers settle in other regions of Italy, especially in the Pontine Marshes of southern Lazio where they populated new towns such as Latina, Aprilia and Pomezia, forming there the so-called "Venetian-Pontine" community (comunità venetopontine).

Some firms have chosen to use Venetian language in advertising, as a beer did some years ago (Xe foresto solo el nome, 'only the name is foreign'). In other cases advertisements in Veneto are given a "Venetian flavour" by adding a Venetian word to standard Italian: for instance an airline used the verb xe (Xe sempre più grande, "it is always bigger") into an Italian sentence (the correct Venetian being el xe senpre pì grando) to advertise new flights from Marco Polo Airport.

In 2007, Venetian was given recognition by the Regional Council of Veneto with regional law no. 8 of 13 April 2007 "Protection, enhancement and promotion of the linguistic and cultural heritage of Veneto". Though the law does not explicitly grant Venetian any official status, it provides for Venetian as object of protection and enhancement, as an essential component of the cultural, social, historical and civil identity of Veneto.

== Geographic distribution ==
The geographic distribution of Venetian language by official status

Venetian is spoken mainly in the Italian regions of Veneto and Friuli-Venezia Giulia and in both Slovenia and Croatia (Istria, Dalmatia and the Kvarner Gulf). Smaller communities are found in Lombardy (Mantua), Trentino, Emilia-Romagna (Rimini and Forlì), Sardinia (Arborea, Terralba, Fertilia), Lazio (Pontine Marshes), Tuscany (Grossetan Maremma) and formerly in Romania (Tulcea).

It is spoken in North and South America by the descendants of Italian immigrants. Notable examples of this are Argentina and Brazil, particularly the city of São Paulo and the Talian dialect spoken in the Brazilian states of Espírito Santo, São Paulo, Paraná, Rio Grande do Sul and Santa Catarina.

In Mexico, the Chipilo Venetian dialect is spoken in the state of Puebla and the town of Chipilo. The town was settled by immigrants from the Veneto region, and some of their descendants have preserved the language to this day. People from Chipilo have gone on to make satellite colonies in Mexico, especially in the states of Guanajuato, Querétaro, and State of Mexico. Venetian has survived in the state of Veracruz, where other Italian migrants have settled since the late 19th century. The people of Chipilo preserve their dialect and call it chipileño, and it has been preserved as a variant since the 19th century. The variant of Venetian spoken by the Cipiłàn (Chipileños) is northern Trevisàn-Feltrìn-Belumàt.

In 2009, the Brazilian city of Serafina Corrêa, in the state of Rio Grande do Sul, gave Talian a joint official status alongside Portuguese. Until the middle of the 20th century, Venetian was also spoken on the Greek Island of Corfu, which had long been under the rule of the Republic of Venice. Venetian had been adopted by a large proportion of the population of Cephalonia, one of the Ionian Islands, because the island was part of the Stato da Màr for almost three centuries.

== Classification ==
A chart of Romance languages based on structural and comparative criteria

Venetian is a Romance language and thus descends from Vulgar Latin. Its classification has always been controversial: According to Tagliavini, for example, it is one of the Italo-Dalmatian languages and most closely related to Istriot on the one hand and Tuscan–Italian on the other.

Some authors include it among the Gallo-Italic languages, and according to others, it is not related to either one. Although Ethnologue groups Venetian into the Gallo-Italic languages, the linguists Giacomo Devoto and Francesco Avolio and the Treccani encyclopedia reject the Gallo-Italic classification. Glottolog v5.3 groups Venetian into its Dalmatian Romance branch alongside Dalmatian and Istriot.

Although the language region is surrounded by Gallo-Italic languages, Venetian does not share some traits with these immediate neighbors. Some scholars stress Venetian's characteristic lack of Gallo-Italic traits (agallicità) or traits found further afield in Gallo-Romance languages (e.g. French, Franco-Provençal) or the Rhaeto-Romance languages (e.g. Friulian, Romansh). For example, Venetian did not undergo vowel rounding or nasalization, palatalize /kt/ and /ks/, or develop rising diphthongs /ei/ and /ou/, and it preserved final syllables, whereas, as in Italian, Venetian diphthongization occurs in historically open syllables.

On the other hand, Venetian does share many other traits with its surrounding Gallo-Italic languages, like interrogative clitics, mandatory unstressed subject pronouns (with some exceptions), the "to be behind to" verbal construction to express the continuous aspect ("El ze drio manjar" = He is eating, lit. he is behind to eat) and the absence of the absolute past tense as well as of geminated consonants. Venetian has some unique traits which are shared by neither Gallo-Italic, nor Italo-Dalmatian languages, such as the use of the impersonal passive forms and the use of the auxiliary verb "to have" for the reflexive voice.

Modern Venetian is not a close relative of the extinct Venetic language spoken in Veneto before Roman expansion, although both are Indo-European, and Venetic may have been an Italic language, like Latin, the ancestor of Venetian and most other languages of Italy. The ancient Veneti gave their name to the city and region, which is why the modern language has a similar name, while their language may have also left a few traces in modern Venetian as a substrate.

== Regional variants ==
The main regional varieties and subvarieties of Venetian language:

- Central (Padua, Vicenza, Polesine), with about 1,500,000 speakers
- Venice
- Eastern/Coastal (Trieste, Grado, Istria, Fiume)
- Western (Verona, Trentino)
- Northern Sinistra Piave of the Province of Treviso (most of the Province of Pordenone)
- North-Central Destra Piave of the Province of Treviso (Belluno, comprising Feltre, Agordo, Cadore, and Zoldo Alto)

All these variants are mutually intelligible, with a minimum 92% in common among the most diverging ones (Central and Western). Modern speakers reportedly can still understand Venetian texts from the 14th century to some extent.

Other noteworthy variants are:

- the variety spoken in Chioggia
- the variety spoken in the Pontine Marshes
- the variety spoken in Dalmatia
- the Talian dialect of Antônio Prado, Entre Rios, Santa Catarina and Toledo, Paraná, among other southern Brazilian cities
- the Chipilo Venetian dialect (Spanish: Chipileño) of Chipilo, Mexico
- the extinct Judeo-Venetian dialect formerly spoken by the Jewish community of Venice

== Grammar ==
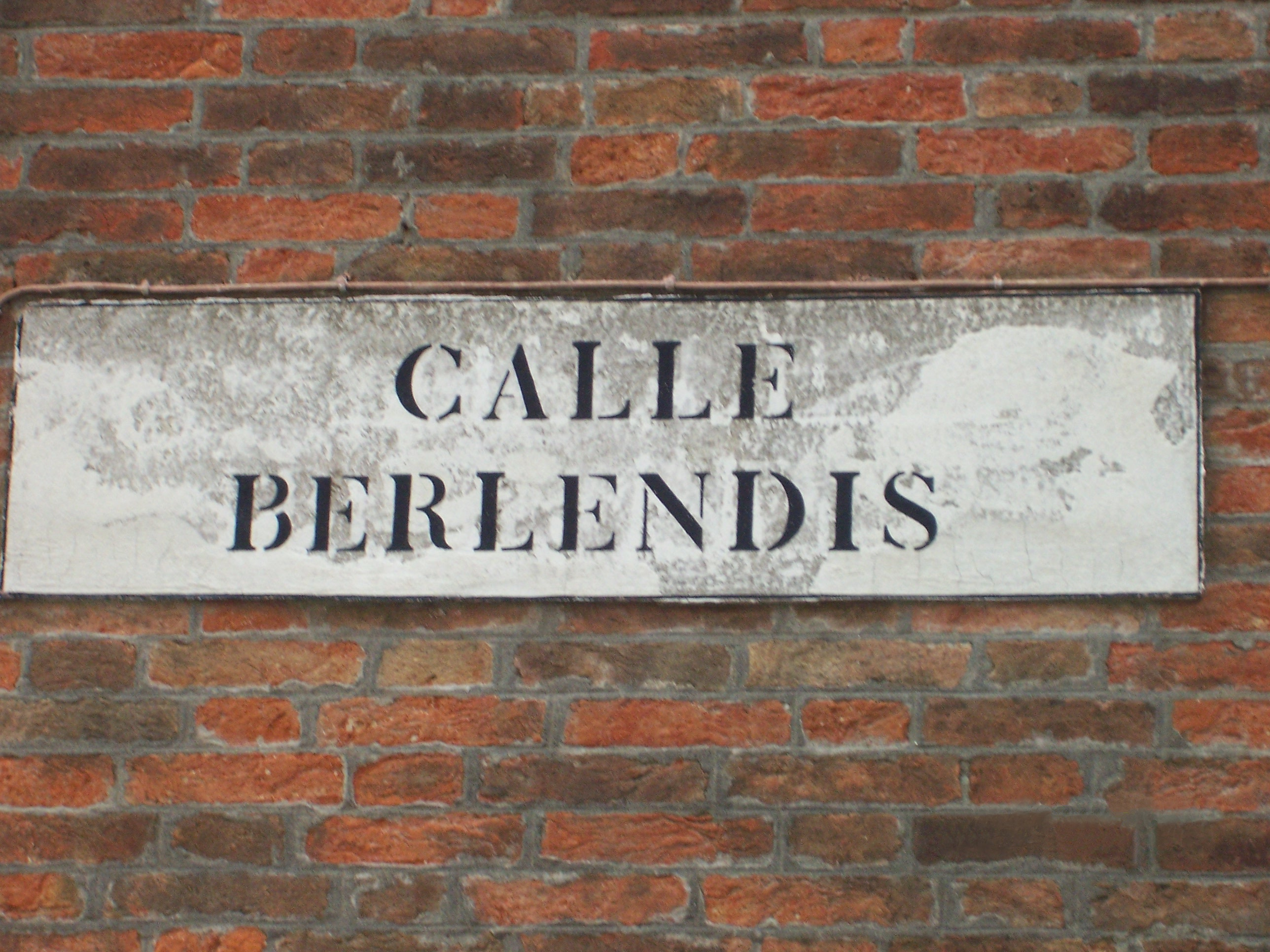
A street sign (nizioléto) in Venice using Venetian calle, as opposed to the Italian via

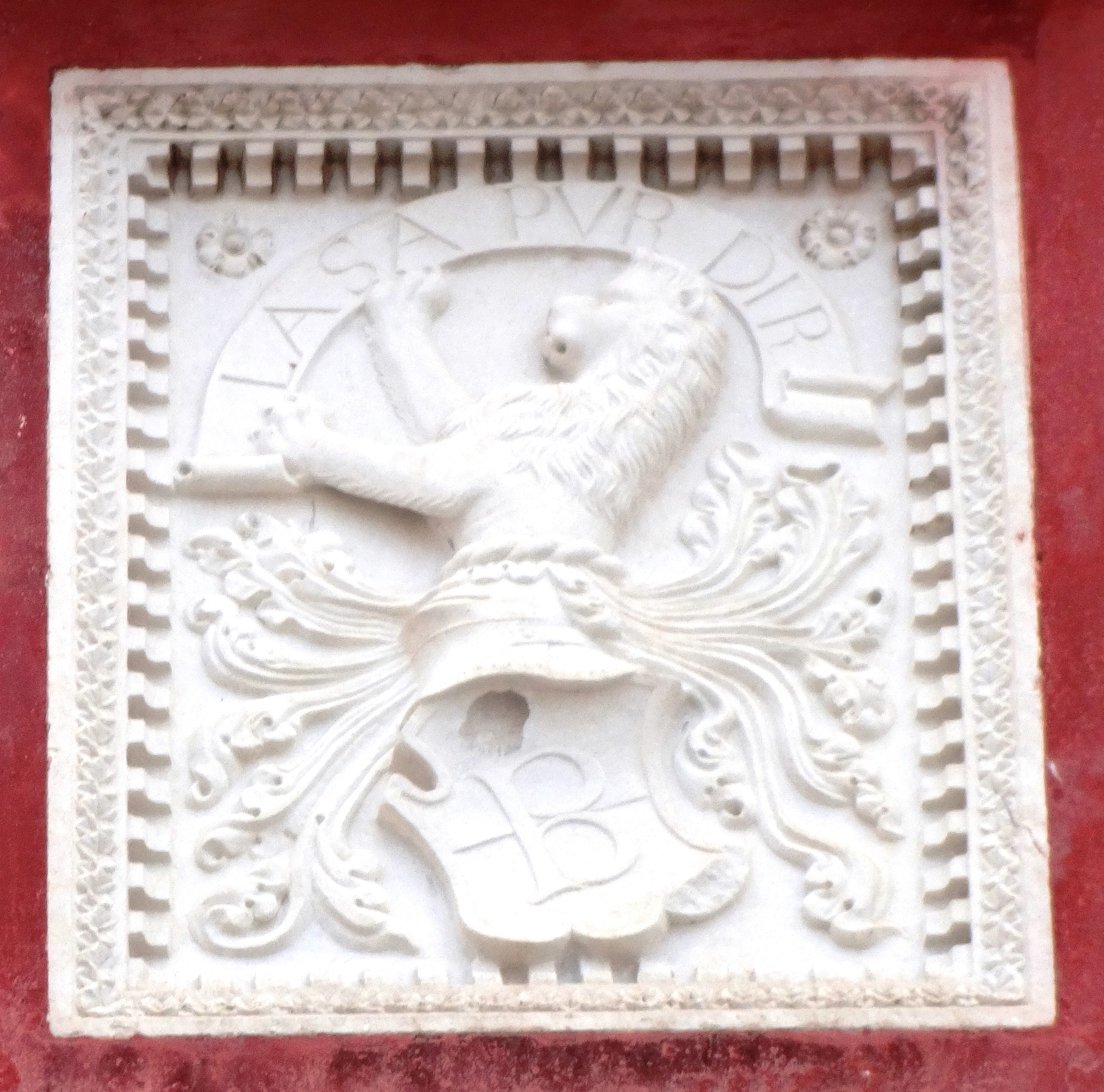
Lasa pur dir (Let them speak), an inscription on the Venetian House in Piran, southwestern Slovenia

Like most Romance languages, Venetian has mostly abandoned the Latin case system, in favor of prepositions and a more rigid subject–verb–object sentence structure. It has thus become more analytic, if not quite as much as English. Venetian also has the Romance articles, both definite (derived from the Latin demonstrative ille) and indefinite (derived from the numeral unus).

Venetian also retained the Latin concepts of gender (masculine and feminine) and number (singular and plural). Unlike the Gallo-Iberian languages, which form plurals by adding -s, Venetian forms plurals in a manner similar to standard Italian. Nouns and adjectives can be modified by suffixes that indicate several qualities such as size, endearment, deprecation, etc. Adjectives (usually postfixed) and articles are inflected to agree with the noun in gender and number, but it is important to mention that the suffix might be deleted because the article is the part that suggests the number. However, Italian is influencing Venetian language:

Venetian	Veneto dialects	Italian	English
el gato graso	el gato graso	il gatto grasso	the fat (male) cat
la gata grasa	ła gata grasa	la gatta grassa	the fat (female) cat
i gati grasi	i gati grasi	i gatti grassi	the fat (male) cats
le gate grase	łe gate grase	le gatte grasse	the fat (female) cats

In recent studies on Venetian variants in Veneto, there has been a tendency to write the so-called "evanescent L" as ⟨ł⟩. While it may help novice speakers, Venetian was never written with this letter. In this article, this symbol is used only in Veneto dialects of Venetian language. It will suffice to know that in Venetian language the letter L in word-initial and intervocalic positions usually becomes a "palatal allomorph", and is barely pronounced.

Very few Venetic words seem to have survived in present Venetian, but there may be more traces left in the morphology, such as the morpheme -esto/asto/isto for the past participle, which can be found in Venetic inscriptions from about 500 BC:

- Venetian: Mi A go fazesto ("I have done")
- Venetian Italian: Mi A go fato
- Standard Italian: Io ho fatto

=== Redundant subject pronouns ===
A peculiarity of Venetian grammar is a "semi-analytical" verbal flexion, with a compulsory clitic subject pronoun before the verb in many sentences, echoing the subject as an ending or a weak pronoun. Independent/emphatic pronouns (e.g. ti), on the contrary, are optional. The clitic subject pronoun (te, el/ła, i/łe) is used with the 2nd and 3rd person singular, and with the 3rd person plural. This feature may have arisen as a compensation for the fact that the 2nd- and 3rd-person inflections for most verbs, which are still distinct in Italian and many other Romance languages, are identical in Venetian.

Venetian	Italian	English
Mi go	Io ho	I have
Ti ti ga	Tu hai	You have

Venetian	Italian	English
Mi so	Io sono	I am
Ti ti xe	Tu sei	You are

The Piedmontese language also has clitic subject pronouns, but the rules are somewhat different. The function of clitics is particularly visible in long sentences, which do not always have clear intonational breaks to easily tell apart vocative and imperative in sharp commands from exclamations with "shouted indicative". For instance, in Venetian the clitic el marks the indicative verb and its masculine singular subject, otherwise there is an imperative preceded by a vocative. Although some grammars regard these clitics as "redundant", they actually provide specific additional information as they mark number and gender, thus providing number-/gender- agreement between the subject(s) and the verb, which does not necessarily show this information on its endings.

=== Interrogative inflection ===
Venetian also has a special interrogative verbal flexion used for direct questions, which also incorporates a redundant pronoun:

Venetian	Veneto dialects	Italian	English
Ti geristu sporco?	(Ti) jèristu onto? or (Ti) xèrito spazo?	(Tu) eri sporco?	Were you dirty?
El can, gerilo sporco?	El can jèreło onto? or Jèreło onto el can ?	Il cane era sporco?	Was the dog dirty?
Ti te gastu domandà?	(Ti) te sito domandà?	(Tu) ti sei domandato?	Did you ask yourself?

=== Auxiliary verbs ===
Reflexive tenses use the auxiliary verb avér ("to have"), as in English, the North Germanic languages, Catalan, Spanish, Romanian and Neapolitan; instead of èssar ("to be"), which would be normal in Italian. The past participle is invariable, unlike Italian:

Venetian	Veneto dialects	Italian	English
Ti ti te ga lavà	(Ti) te te à/gà/ghè lavà	(Tu) ti sei lavato	You washed yourself
(Lori) i se ga desmissià	(Lori) i se gà/à svejà	(Loro) si sono svegliati	They woke up

=== Continuing action ===
Another peculiarity of the language is the use of the phrase eser drìo (literally, "to be behind") to indicate continuing action:

Venetian	Veneto dialects	Italian	English
Me pare, el ze drìo parlàr	Mé pare 'l ze drìo(invià) parlàr	Mio padre sta parlando	My father is speaking

Another progressive form in some Venetian dialects uses the construction èsar łà che (lit. 'to be there that'):

- Venetian dialect: Me pare l'è là che'l parla (lit. 'My father he is there that he speaks').

The use of progressive tenses is more pervasive than in Italian; e.g.

- English: "He wouldn't have been speaking to you".
- Venetian: No'l sarìa miga sta drio parlarte a ti.

That construction does not occur in Italian: *Non sarebbe mica stato parlandoti is not syntactically valid.

=== Subordinate clauses ===
Subordinate clauses have double introduction ("whom that", "when that", "which that", "how that"), as in Old English:

Venetian	Veneto dialects	Italian	English
Mi so de chi che ti parli	So de chi che te parli	So di chi parli	I know who you are talking about

As in other Romance languages, the subjunctive mood is widely used in subordinate clauses.

Venetian	Veneto dialects	Italian	English
Mi credeva che'l fuse ...	Credéa/évo che'l fuse ...	Credevo che fosse ...	I thought he was ...

== Phonology ==
=== Consonants ===
Venetian consonant phonemes
		Labial	Dental	Alveolar	Post-alv. /Palatal	Velar
Nasal		m		n	ɲ	ŋ
Plosive/ Affricate	voiceless	p	t	(t͡s)	t͡ʃ	k
Plosive/ Affricate	voiced	b	d	(d͡z)	d͡ʒ	ɡ
Fricative	voiceless	f	(θ)	s		
Fricative	voiced	v	(ð)	z		
Tap				ɾ		
Approximant		w		l	j	(e̯)

Some dialects of Venetian have certain sounds not present in Italian, such as the interdental voiceless fricative [θ], often spelled with ⟨ç⟩, ⟨z⟩, ⟨zh⟩, or ⟨ž⟩, and similar to English th in thing and thought. This sound occurs, for example, in çéna ("supper", also written zhena, žena), which is pronounced the same as Castilian Spanish cena (which has the same meaning). The voiceless interdental fricative occurs in Bellunese, north-Trevisan, and in some Central Venetian rural areas around Padua, Vicenza and the mouth of the river Po.

Because the pronunciation variant [θ] is more typical of older speakers and speakers living outside of major cities, it has come to be socially stigmatized, and most speakers now use [s] or [ts] instead of [θ]. In those dialects with the pronunciation [s], the sound has fallen together with ordinary ⟨s⟩, and so it is not uncommon to simply write ⟨s⟩ (or ⟨ss⟩ between vowels) instead of ⟨ç⟩ or ⟨zh⟩ (such as sena).

Similarly some dialects of Venetian also have a voiced interdental fricative [ð], often written ⟨z⟩ (as in el pianze 'he cries'); but in most dialects this sound is now pronounced either as [dz] (Italian voiced-Z), or more typically as [z] (Italian voiced-S, written ⟨x⟩, as in el pianxe); in a few dialects the sound appears as [d] and may therefore be written instead with the letter ⟨d⟩, as in el piande.

Some varieties of Venetian also distinguish an ordinary [l] vs. a weakened or lenited ("evanescent") ⟨l⟩, which in some orthographic norms is indicated with the letter ⟨ł⟩ or ⟨ƚ⟩; in more conservative dialects, however, ⟨l⟩ and ⟨ł⟩ are merged as ordinary [l]. In those dialects that have both types, the precise phonetic realization of ⟨ł⟩ depends both on its phonological environment and on the dialect of the speaker. In Venice and its mainland as well as in most of central Veneto (excluding the peripheral provinces of Verona, Belluno and some islands of the lagoon) the realization is a non-syllabic [e̯] (usually described as nearly like an "e" and so often spelled as ⟨e⟩), when ⟨ł⟩ is adjacent (only) to back vowels (⟨a o u⟩), vs. a null realization when ⟨ł⟩ is adjacent to a front vowel (⟨i e⟩).

In dialects further inland ⟨ł⟩ may be realized as a partially vocalised ⟨l⟩. Thus, for example, góndoła 'gondola' may sound like góndoea [ˈɡoŋdoe̯a], góndola [ˈɡoŋdola], or góndoa [ˈɡoŋdoa]. In dialects having a null realization of intervocalic ⟨ł⟩, although pairs of words such as scóła, "school" and scóa, "broom" are homophonous (both being pronounced [ˈskoa]), they are still distinguished orthographically.

Venetian, like Spanish, does not have the geminate consonants characteristic of standard Italian, Tuscan, Neapolitan and other languages of southern Italy; thus Italian fette ("slices"), palla ("ball") and penna ("pen") correspond to féte, bała, and péna in Venetian. The masculine singular noun ending, corresponding to -o/-e in Italian, is often unpronounced in Venetian after continuants, particularly in rural varieties: Italian pieno ("full") corresponds to Venetian pien, Italian altare to Venetian altar. The extent to which final vowels are deleted varies by dialect: the central–southern varieties delete vowels only after /n/, whereas the northern variety deletes vowels also after dental stops and velars; the eastern and western varieties are in between these two extremes.

The velar nasal [ŋ] (the final sound in English "song") occurs frequently in Venetian. A word-final /n/ is always velarized, which is especially obvious in the pronunciation of many local Venetian surnames that end in ⟨n⟩, such as Marin [maˈɾiŋ] and Manin [maˈniŋ], as well as in common Venetian words such as man ([ˈmaŋ] "hand"), piron ([piˈɾoŋ] "fork"). Moreover, Venetian always uses [ŋ] in consonant clusters that start with a nasal, whereas Italian only uses [ŋ] before velar stops: e.g. [kaŋˈtaɾ] "to sing", [iŋˈvɛɾno] "winter", [ˈoŋzaɾ] "to anoint", [ɾaŋˈdʒaɾse] "to cope with".

Speakers of Italian generally lack this sound and usually substitute a dental [n] for final Venetian [ŋ], changing for example [maˈniŋ] to [maˈnin] and [maˈɾiŋ] to [maˈrin].

=== Vowels ===
	Front	Central	Back
Close	i		u
Close-mid	e		o
Open-mid	ɛ	(ɐ)	ɔ
Open		a	

An accented á is pronounced as [ɐ]. An intervocalic /u/ could be pronounced as a [w] sound.

== Prosody ==
While written Venetian looks similar to Italian, it sounds very different, with a distinct lilting cadence. Compared to Italian, in Venetian syllabic rhythms are more evenly timed and accents are less marked; on the other hand, tonal modulation is much wider and melodic curves are more intricate. Stressed and unstressed syllables sound almost the same; there are no long vowels, and there is no consonant lengthening. Compare the Italian sentence va laggiù con lui [val.ladˌd͡ʒuk.konˈluː.i] "go there with him" (all long/heavy syllables but final) with Venetian va là zo co lu [va.laˌzo.koˈlu] (all short/light syllables).

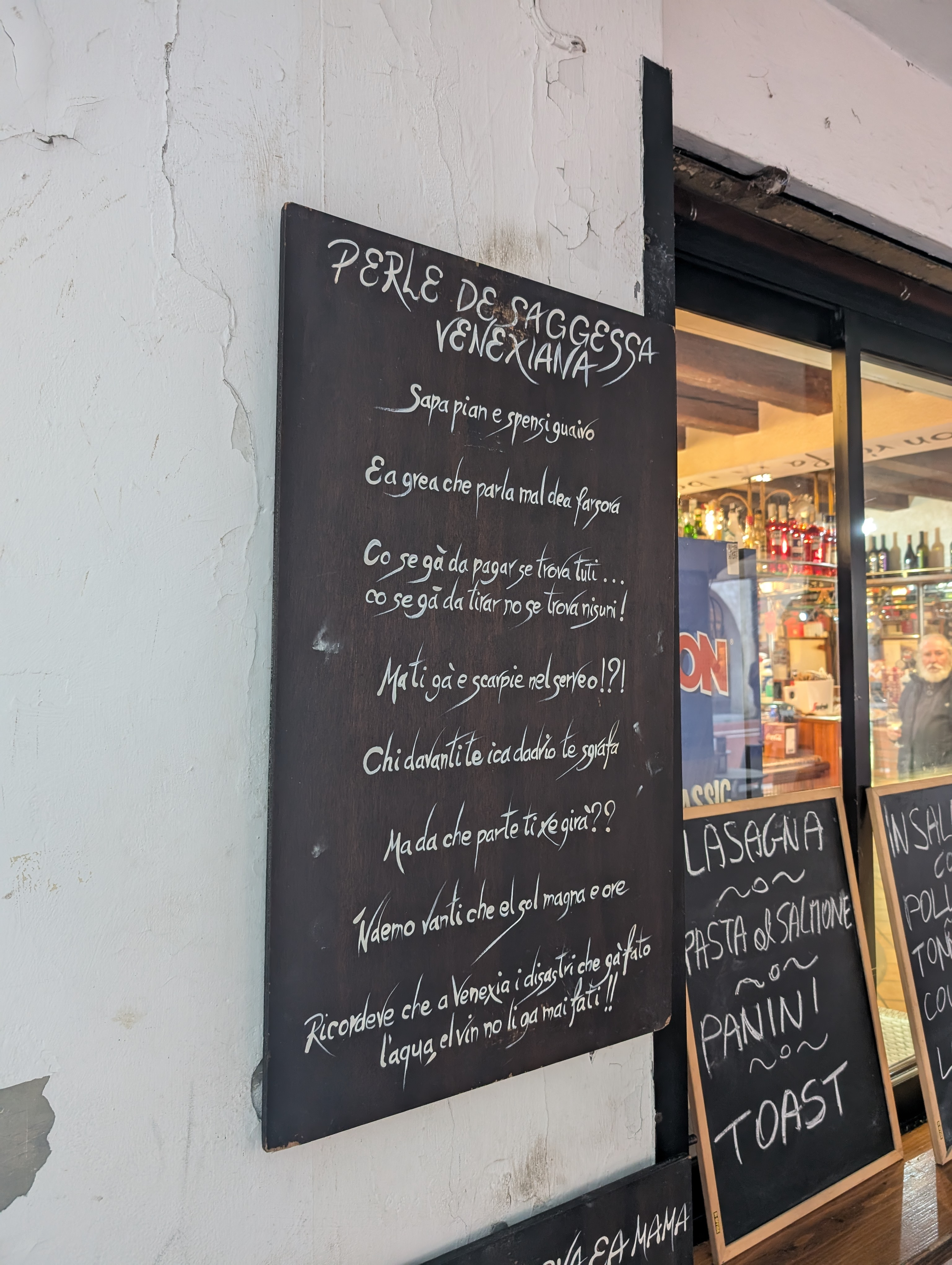
Venetian language proverb board outside of a bar in Mestre, Veneto

== Sample etymological lexicon ==
As a direct descent of regional spoken Latin, Venetian lexicon derives its vocabulary substantially from Latin and (in more recent times) from Tuscan, so that most of its words are cognate with the corresponding words of Italian. Venetian includes however many words derived from other sources (such as ancient Venetic, Greek, Gothic, and German), and has preserved some Latin words not used to the same extent in Italian, resulting in many words that are not cognate with their equivalent words in Italian, such as:

English	Italian	Venetian (DECA)	Venetian word origin
today	oggi	uncò, 'ncò, incò, ancò, oncò, ancúo, incoi	from Latin hunc + hodie
pharmacy	farmacia	apotèca	from Ancient Greek ἀποθήκη (apothḗkē)
to drink	bere	trincàr	from German trinken "to drink"
apricot	albicocca	armelín	from Latin armenīnus
to bore	dare noia, seccare	astiàr	from Gothic 𐌷𐌰𐌹𐍆𐍃𐍄𐍃, haifsts "contest"
peanuts	arachidi	bagígi	from Arabic habb-ajiz
to be spicy hot	essere piccante	becàr	from Italian beccare, literally "to peck"
spaghetti	vermicello, spaghetti	bígolo	from Latin (bom)byculus
eel	anguilla	bizàto, bizàta	from Latin bestia "beast", compare also Italian biscia, a kind of snake
snake	serpente	bísa, bíso	from Latin bestia "beast", compare also Ital. biscia, a kind of snake
peas	piselli	bízi	related to the Italian word
lizard	lucertola	izarda, rizardola	from Latin lacertus, same origin as English lizard
to throw	tirare	trar via	local cognate of Italian tirare
fog	nebbia foschia	calígo	from Latin caligo
corner/side	angolo/parte	cantón	from Latin cantus
find	trovare	catàr	from Latin *adcaptare
chair	sedia	caréga, trón	from Latin cathedra and thronus (borrowings from Greek)
hello, goodbye	ciao	ciao	from Venetian s-ciao "slave", from Medieval Latin sclavus
to catch, to take	prendere	ciapàr	from Latin capere
when (non-interr.)	quando	co	from Latin cum
to kill	uccidere	copàr	from Old Italian accoppare, originally "to behead"
miniskirt	minigonna	carpéta	compare English carpet
skirt	sottana	còtoła	from Latin cotta, "coat, dress"
T-shirt	maglietta	fanèla	borrowing from Greek
drinking glass	bicchiere	gòto	from Latin guttus, "cruet"
exit	uscita	insía	from Latin in + exita
I	io	mi	from Latin me "me" (accusative case); Italian io is derived from the Latin nominative form ego
too much	troppo	masa	from Greek μᾶζα (mâza)
to bite	mordere	morsegàr, smorsegàr	deverbal derivative, from Latin morsus "bitten", compare Italian morsicare
moustaches	baffi	mustaci	from Greek μουστάκι (moustaki)
cat	gatto	munín, gato, gateo	perhaps onomatopoeic, from the sound of a cat's meow
big sheaf	grosso covone	meda	from Latin meta "cone, pyramid"; cf. Old French moie "haystack"
donkey	asino	muso	from Latin mūsus, mūsum "snout" (compare French museau)
bat	pipistrello	nòtoła, notol, barbastrío, signàpoła	derived from not "night" (compare Italian notte)
rat	ratto	pantegàna	from Slovene podgana
beat, cheat, sexual intercourse	imbrogliare, superare in gara, amplesso	pinciàr	from French pincer (compare English pinch)
dandelion	tarassaco	pisalet	from French pissenlit
truant	marinare scuola	plao far	from German blau machen
apple	mela	pomo/pón	from Latin pōmum
to break, to shred	strappare	zbregàr	from Gothic 𐌱𐍂𐌹𐌺𐌰𐌽 (brikan), related to English to break and German brechen
money	denaro soldi	schèi	from German Scheidemünze
grasshopper	cavalletta	saltapaiusc	from salta "hop" + paiusc "grass" (Italian paglia)
squirrel	scoiattolo	zgiràt, scirata, skirata	Related to Italian word, probably from Greek σκίουρος (skíouros)
spirit from grapes, brandy	grappa acquavite	znjapa	from German Schnaps
to shake	scuotere	zgorlàr, scorlàr	from Latin ex + crollare
rail	rotaia	sina	from German Schiene
tired	stanco	straco	from Lombard strak
line, streak, stroke, strip	linea, striscia	strica	from Gothic 𐍃𐍄𐍂𐌹𐌺𐍃, striks or German Strich 'stroke, line'. Example: Tirar na strica "to draw a line".
to press	premere, schiacciare	strucàr	from Gothic or Lombard; cf. German drücken 'to press', Swedish trycka. Example: Struca un tasto / boton "Strike any key / Press any button".
to whistle	fischiare	supiàr, subiàr, sficiàr, sifolàr	from Latin sub + flare, compare French siffler
to pick up	raccogliere	tòr su	from Latin tollere
pan	pentola	técia, téia, tegia	from Latin tecula
lad, boy	ragazzo	tozàt(o) (toxato), fio	from Italian tosare, "to cut someone's hair"
lad, boy	ragazzo	puto, putèło, putełeto, butèl	from Latin puer, putus
lad, boy	ragazzo	matelot	from French matelot "sailor"
cow	mucca, vacca	vaca	from Latin vacca
gun	fucile-scoppiare	sciop, sciòpo, sciopàr, sciopón	from Latin scloppum (onomatopoeic)
path(way), trail	sentiero	troi	from Friulian troi, from Gaulish *trogo; cf. Romansh trutg
to worry	preoccuparsi, vaneggiare	dzavariàr, dhavariàr, zavariàr	from Latin variare

== Spelling systems ==
=== Modern script (GVIM-DECA) ===
Since December 2017 the Venetian language adopted a modern writing system, named GVIM (acronym for Grafia del Veneto Internazionale Moderno, i.e. Writing system for Modern International Venetian) thanks to the 2010 2nd Regional ad hoc Commission of the Regione del Veneto. The Academia de ła Bona Creansa – Academy of the Venetian Language, an NGO accredited according to the UNESCO 2003 Convention for the Venetian language and culture had already worked, tested, applied and certified a full writing system (presented in a scientific publication in linguistics in 2016), known with the DECA acronym (Drio El Costumar de l'Academia, i.e. literally According to the Use of the Academia).

The DECA writing system has been officialized by the Veneto Region under the name Grafia Veneta Internazionale Moderna, by unanimous vote of the Commissione Grafia e Toponomastica (i.e. Script and Topononymy Committee) of the Venetian language on December 14, 2017, and available at portal of the Venetian Regional Council dedicated to the Venetian language. The same writing system was then employed for the first grammar of the Venetian language to be published by a university, in Brasil, in 2018.

The DECA, then GVIM, had already been used in a trilingual document approved by the Veneto Regional Council (Aprile 2016) in Italian, Venetian, and English.

=== Traditional system ===
Venetian currently has an official writing system. Traditionally it is written using the Latin script—sometimes with certain additional letters or diacritics. The basis for some of these conventions can be traced to Old Venetian, while others are modern innovations.

Medieval texts, written in Old Venetian, include the letters ⟨x⟩, ⟨ç⟩ and ⟨z⟩ to represent sounds that do not exist or have a different distribution in Italian. Specifically:

- The letter ⟨x⟩ was often employed in words that nowadays have a voiced /z/-sound (compare English xylophone); for instance ⟨x⟩ appears in words such as raxon, Croxe, caxa ("reason", "(holy) Cross" and "house"). The precise phonetic value of ⟨x⟩ in Old Venetian texts remains unknown, however.
- The letter ⟨z⟩ often appeared in words that nowadays have a varying voiced pronunciation ranging from /z/ to /dz/ or /ð/ or even to /d/; even in contemporary spelling zo "down" may represent any of /zo, dzo, ðo/ or even /do/, depending on the dialect; similarly zovena "young woman" could be any of /ˈzovena/, /ˈdzovena/ or /ˈðovena/, and zero "zero" could be /ˈzɛro/, /ˈdzɛro/ or /ˈðɛro/.
- Likewise, ⟨ç⟩ was written for a voiceless sound which now varies, depending on the dialect spoken, from /s/ to /ts/ to /θ/, as in for example dolçe "sweet", now /ˈdolse ~ ˈdoltse ~ ˈdolθe/, dolçeça "sweetness", now /dolˈsesa ~ dolˈtsetsa ~ dolˈθeθa/, or sperança "hope", now /speˈransa ~ speˈrantsa ~ speˈranθa/.

The usage of letters in medieval and early modern texts was not, however, entirely consistent. In particular, as in other northern Italian languages, the letters ⟨z⟩ and ⟨ç⟩ were often used interchangeably for both voiced and voiceless sounds. Differences between earlier and modern pronunciation, divergences in pronunciation within the modern Venetian-speaking region, differing attitudes about how closely to model spelling on Italian norms, as well as personal preferences, some of which reflect sub-regional identities, have all hindered the adoption of a single unified spelling system.

Nevertheless, in practice, most spelling conventions are the same as in Italian. In some early modern texts letter ⟨x⟩ becomes limited to word-initial position, as in xe ("is"), where its use was unavoidable because Italian spelling cannot represent /z/ there. In between vowels, the distinction between /s/ and /z/ was ordinarily indicated by doubled ⟨ss⟩ for the former and single ⟨s⟩ for the latter. For example, basa was used to represent /ˈbaza/ ("he/she kisses"), whereas bassa represented /ˈbasa/ ("low"). (Before consonants there is no contrast between /s/ and /z/, as in Italian, so a single ⟨s⟩ is always used in this circumstance, it being understood that the ⟨s⟩ will agree in voicing with the following consonant. For example, ⟨st⟩ represents only /st/, but ⟨sn⟩ represents /zn/.)

Traditionally the letter ⟨z⟩ was ambiguous, having the same values as in Italian (both voiced and voiceless affricates /dz/ and /ts/). Nevertheless, in some books the two pronunciations are sometimes distinguished (in between vowels at least) by using doubled ⟨zz⟩ to indicate /ts/ (or in some dialects /θ/) but a single ⟨z⟩ for /dz/ (or /ð/, /d/).

In more recent practice the use of ⟨x⟩ to represent /z/, both in word-initial as well as in intervocalic contexts, has become increasingly common, but no entirely uniform convention has emerged for the representation of the voiced vs. voiceless affricates (or interdental fricatives), although a return to using ⟨ç⟩ and ⟨z⟩ remains an option under consideration.

Regarding the spelling of the vowel sounds, because in Venetian, as in Italian, there is no contrast between tense and lax vowels in unstressed syllables, the orthographic grave and acute accents can be used to mark both stress and vowel quality at the same time: à /a/, á /ɐ/, è /ɛ/, é /e/, í /i/, ò /ɔ/, ó /o/, ú /u/. Different orthographic norms prescribe slightly different rules for when stressed vowels must be written with accents or may be left unmarked, and no single system has been accepted by all speakers.

Venetian allows the consonant cluster /stʃ/ (not present in Italian), which is sometimes written ⟨s-c⟩ or ⟨s'c⟩ before i or e, and ⟨s-ci⟩ or ⟨s'ci⟩ before other vowels. Examples include s-ciarir (Italian schiarire, "to clear up"), s-cèt (schietto, "plain clear"), s-ciòp (schioppo, "gun") and s-ciao (schiavo, "[your] servant", ciao, "hello", "goodbye"). The hyphen or apostrophe is used because the combination ⟨sc(i)⟩ is conventionally used for the /ʃ/ sound, as in Italian spelling; e.g. scèmo (scemo, "stupid"); whereas ⟨sc⟩ before a, o and u represents /sk/: scàtoła (scatola, "box"), scóndar (nascondere, "to hide"), scusàr (scusare, "to forgive").

=== Proposed systems ===
Recently there have been attempts to standardize and simplify the script by reusing older letters, e.g. by using ⟨x⟩ for [z] and a single ⟨s⟩ for [s]; then one would write baxa for [ˈbaza] ("[third person singular] kisses") and basa for [ˈbasa] ("low"). Some authors have continued or resumed the use of ⟨ç⟩, but only when the resulting word is not too different from the Italian orthography: in modern Venetian writings, it is then easier to find words as çima and çento, rather than força and sperança, even though all these four words display the same phonological variation in the position marked by the letter ⟨ç⟩. Another recent convention is to use ⟨ƚ⟩ (in place of older ⟨ł⟩ ) for the "soft" l, to allow a more unified orthography for all variants of the language. However, in spite of their theoretical advantages, these proposals have not been very successful outside of academic circles, because of regional variations in pronunciation and incompatibility with existing literature.

More recently, on December 14, 2017, the Modern International Manual of Venetian Spelling was approved by the new Commission for Spelling of 2010. It was translated into three languages (Italian, Venetian and English) and it exemplifies and explains every single letter and every sound of the Venetian language. The graphic accentuation and punctuation systems are added as corollaries. Overall, the system was greatly simplified from previous ones to allow both Italian and foreign speakers to learn and understand the Venetian spelling and alphabet in a more straightforward way.

The Venetian speakers of Chipilo use a system based on Spanish orthography, even though it does not contain letters for [j] and [θ]. The American linguist Carolyn McKay proposed a writing system for that variant based entirely on the Italian alphabet. However, the system was not very popular.

=== Orthographies comparison ===
[IPA]		Official (GVIM-DECA)	classic	Brunelli	Chipilo	Talian	Latin origin	Examples
/ˈa/		à	à	à	á	à	ă /a/, ā /aː/	
/b/		b	b	b	b, v	b	b- /b/, bb /bː/	barba (beard, uncle) from barba
/k/	+ a \ o \ u	c	c	c	c	c	c- /k/, cc /kː/, tc /tk/, xc /ksk/	poch (little) from paucus
/k/	+ i \ e \ y \ ø	ch	ch	ch	qu	ch	ch /kʰ/, qu /kʷ/	chiete (quiet) from quiētem
/k/	(between vowels)	c(h)	cc(h)	c(h)	c / qu	c(h)	cc /kː/, ch /kʰ/, qu /kʷ/	tacüin (notebook) from taccuinum
/kw/		cu	qu		cu		qu /kw/	quatro (four) from quattuor
/ts/~/θ/~/s/	+ a \ o \ u	ts~th~s	ç, (z)	ç	-~zh~-	–	ti /tj/, th /tʰ/	
/ts/~/θ/~/s/	+ i \ e \ y \ ø	ts~th~s	c, (z)	ç	-~zh~-	–	c- /k/, cc /kː/, ti /tj/, th /tʰ/, tc /tk/, xc /ksk/	
/ts/~/θ/~/s/	(between vowels)	ts~th~s	zz	ç	-~zh~-	–	ti /tj/, th /tʰ/	
/s/	(before a vowel)	s	s	s	s	s	s- /s/, ss /sː/, sc /sc/, ps /ps/, x /ks/	supiar (to whistle) from sub-flare
/s/	(between vowels)	s	ss	s	s	ss	s- /s/, ss /sː/, sc /sc/, ps /ps/, x /ks/	casa (cash desk) from capsa
/s/	(before unvoiced consonant)	s	s	s	s	s	s- /s/, ss /sː/, sc /sc/, ps /ps/, x /ks/	
/tʃ/	+ a \ o \ u	ci	chi	ci	ch	ci	cl- /cl/, ccl /cːl/	sciào (slave) from sclavus
/tʃ/	+ i \ e \ y \ ø	c	chi	c	ch	c	cl- /cl/, ccl /cːl/	cieza (church) from ecclēsia
/tʃ/	(between vowels)	c(i)	cchi	c(i)	ch	c(i)	cl- /cl/, ccl /cːl/	
/tʃ/	(ending of word)	c'	cch'	c'	ch	c'	cl- /cl/, ccl /cːl/	moc' (snot) from *mucceus
/d/		d	d	d	–	d	d /d/, -t- /t/, (g /ɟ/ , di /dj/, z /dz/)	cadena (chain) from catēna
/ˈɛ/		è	è	è	è	è	ĕ /ɛ/, ae /ae̯/	
/ˈe/		é	é	é	é	é	ē /ɛː/, ĭ /i/, oe /oe̯/	pévare (pepper) from piper
/f/	–	f	f	f	f	f	f- /f/, ff /fː/, ph- /pʰ/	finco (finch) from fringilla
/f/	(between vowels)	f	ff	f	f	f	ff /fː/, pph /pːʰ/	
/ɡ/	+ a \ o \ u	g	g	g	g	g	g /ɡ/, -c- /k/, ch /kʰ/	ruga (bean weevil) from brūchus
/ɡ/	+ i \ e \ y \ ø	gh	gh	gh	gu	gh	gu /ɡʷ/, ch /kʰ/	
/dz/~/ð/~/z/	+ a \ o \ u	dz~dh~z	z	z	-~d~-	–	z /dz/, di /dj/	zorno from diurnus
/dz/~/ð/~/z/	+ i \ e \ y \ ø	dz~dh~z	z	z	-~d~-	–	z /dz/, g /ɟ/, di /dj/	gengiva (gum) from gingiva
/z/	(before a vowel)	z	x	x	z	z	?, (z /dz/, g /ɉ/, di /dj/)	el xe (he is) from ipse est
/z/	(between vowels)	z	s	x	z	s	-c- /c/ (before e/i), -s- /s/, x /ɡz/	paxe (peace) from pāx, pācis
/z/	(before voiced consonant)	z	s	s	s	s	s- /s/, x /ɡz/	sgorlar (to shake) from ex-crollare
/dʒ/	+ a \ o \ u	gi	ghi	gi	gi	j	gl /ɟl/, -cl- /cl/	giatso (ice) from glaciēs
/dʒ/	+ i \ e \ y \ ø	g	ghi	g	g	gi	gl /ɟl/, -cl- /cl/	giiro (dormouse) from glīris
/j/~/dʒ/		j~g(i)	g(i)	j	–	j	i /j/, li /lj/	ajo / agio (garlic) from ālium
/j/		j, i	j, i	i	y, i	i	i /j/	
/ˈi/		í	í	í	í	í	ī /iː/, ȳ /yː/	fio (son) from fīlius
–		h	h	h	h	h	h /ʰ/	màchina (machine) from māchina
/l/		l	l	l	l	l	l /l/	
/e̯/		ł	l	ł	–	–	l /l/	
/l.j/~/j/~/l.dʒ/		li~j~g(i)	li	lj	ly	li	li /li/, /lj/	Talia / Taja / Talgia (Italy) from Itālia
/m/	(before vowels)	m	m	m	m	m	m /m/	
/n/	(before vowels)	n	n	n	n	n	n /n/	
/n/	(at the end of the syllable)	n' / 'n	–	n'	n'	n'	n /n/	don' (we go) from *andamo
/ŋ/	(at the end of the syllable)	n / n-	m, n	n	n	n	m /m/, n /ɱ~n̪~n~ŋ/, g /ŋ/	don (we went) from andavamo
/ŋ.j/~/ŋ.dʒ/		ni~ng(i)	ni	n-j	ny	n-j	ni /n.j/	
/ɲ/		ǌ	gn	gn	ñ	gn	gn /ŋn/, ni /nj/	cugnà (brother-in-law) from cognātus
/ˈɔ/		ò	ò	ò	ò	ò	ŏ /ɔ/	
/ˈo/		ó	ó	ó	ó	ó	ō /ɔː/, ŭ /u/	
/p/	–	p	p	p	p	p	p- /p/, pp /pː/	
/p/	(between vowels)	p	pp	p	p	p	p- /p/, pp /pː/	
/r/		r	r	r	r	r	r /r/	
/r.j/~/r.dʒ/		ri~rg(i)	(ri)	rj	ry	rj		
/t/	–	t	t	t	t	t	t- /t/, tt /tː/, ct /kt/, pt /pt/	sète (seven) from septem
/t/	(between vowels)	t	tt	t	t	t	t- /t/, tt /tː/, ct /kt/, pt /pt/	
/ˈu/		ú	ú	ú	ú	ú	ū /uː/	
/w/	(after /k/, /ɡ/ or before o)	u	u	u	u	u	u /w/	
/v/		v	v	v	v	v	u /w/, -b- /b/, -f- /f/, -p- /p/	
/ˈɐ/~/ˈʌ/~/ˈɨ/	(dialectal)	â / á	–	–	–	–	ē /ɛː/, an /ã/	stâla (star) from stēlla
/ˈø/	(dialectal)	(ø)	(oe)	(o)	–	–	o /o/	chør (heart) from Latin cor
/ˈy/	(dialectal)	(y / ý)	(ue)	(u)	–	–	ū /uː/	schyro (dark) from obscūrus
/h/	(dialectal)	h / fh	–	–	–	–	f /f/	hèr (iron) from ferrus
/ʎ/	(dialectal)	ǉ	–	–	–	–	li /lj/	bataǉa (battle) from battālia
/ʃ/	(dialectal)	sj	–	(sh)	–	–	s /s/	
/ʒ/	(dialectal)	zj	–	(xh)	–	–	g /ɡ/	xjal (rooster) from gallus

== Sample texts ==
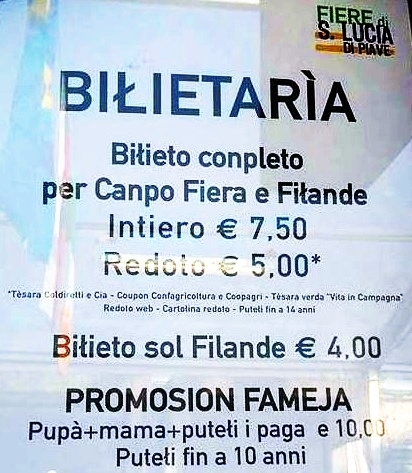
Venetian sign in ticket office, Santa Lucia di Piave

=== Ruzante returning from war ===
The following sample, in the old dialect of Padua, comes from a play by Ruzante (Angelo Beolco), titled Parlamento de Ruzante che iera vegnù de campo ("Dialogue of Ruzante who came from the battlefield", 1529). The character, a peasant returning home from the war, is expressing to his friend Menato his relief at being still alive:

Orbéntena, el no serae mal
star in campo per sto robare,
se 'l no foesse che el se ha pur
de gran paure. Càncaro ala roba!
A' son chialò mi, ala segura,
e squase che no a' no cherzo
esserghe gnan. ...
Se mi mo' no foesse mi?
E che a foesse stò amazò in campo?
E che a foesse el me spirito?
Lo sarae ben bela.
No, càncaro, spiriti no magna.

Translation:

Really, it would not be that bad
to be in the battlefield looting,
were it not that one gets also
big scares. Damn the loot!
I am right here, in safety,
and almost can't believe
I am. ...
And if I were not me?
And if I had been killed in battle?
And if I were my ghost?
That would be just great.
No, damn, ghosts don't eat.

=== Discorso de Perasto ===
The following sample is taken from the Perasto Speech (Discorso de Perasto), given on August 23, 1797, at Perasto, by Venetian Captain Giuseppe Viscovich, at the last lowering of the flag of the Venetian Republic (nicknamed the "Republic of Saint Mark").

Par trezentosetantasete ani
le nostre sostanse, el nostro sangue,
le nostre vite le xè sempre stàe
par Ti, S. Marco; e fedelisimi
senpre se gavemo reputà,
Ti co nu, nu co Ti,
e sempre co Ti sul mar
semo stài lustri e virtuosi.
Nisun co Ti ne gà visto scanpar,
nisun co Ti ne gà visto vinti e spaurosi!

Translation:

For three hundred and seventy seven years
our bodies, our blood
our lives have always been
for You, St. Mark; and very faithful
we have always thought ourselves,
You with us, we with You,
And always with You on the sea
we have been illustrious and virtuous.
No one has seen us with You flee,
No one has seen us with You defeated and fearful!

=== Francesco Artico ===
The following is a contemporary text by Francesco Artico. The elderly narrator is recalling the church choir singers of his youth. (see the full original text with audio):

Sti cantori vèci da na volta,
co i cioéa su le profezie,
in mezo al coro, davanti al restèl,
co'a ose i 'ndéa a cior volta
no so 'ndove e ghe voéa un bèl tóc
prima che i tornésse in qua
e che i rivésse in cao,
màssima se i jèra pareciàdi onti
co mezo litro de quel bon
tant par farse coràjo.

Translation:

These old singers of the past,
when they picked up the Prophecies,
in the middle of the choir, in front of the twelve-branched candelabrum,
with their voice they went off
who knows where, and it was a long time
before they came back
and landed on the ground,
especially if they had been previously 'oiled'
with half a litre of the good one [wine]
just to make courage.

== Miscellaneous ==
Due to the diacritic letter Ł being present in few languages besides Polish and Venetian, the latter of which does not have any official recognition by software producers like Microsoft and Apple, the Polish magazine KomputerŚwiat noted that the Venice region has the highest usage of Polish keyboard settings outside of Poland on iPhones and Windows, although the same article found in an unrepresentative sample that when needing the letter without the keyboard, some Venetians google the Polish złoty or the exchange rate in order to copy-paste the letter.

== Venetian lexical exports to English ==
Many words were exported to English, either directly or via Italian or French. The list below shows some examples of imported words, with the date of first appearance in English according to the Shorter Oxford English Dictionary.

Venetian (DECA)	English	Year	Origin, notes
arsenal	arsenal	1506	Arabic دار الصناعة dār al-ṣināʻah "house of manufacture, factory"
articioco	artichoke	1531	Arabic الخرشوف al-kharshūf; previously entered Castilian as alcachofa and then French as artichaut
bałota	ballot	1549	ball used in Venetian elections; cf. English to "black-ball"
cazin	casino	1789	"little house"; adopted in Italianized form
contrabando	contraband	1529	illegal traffic of goods
gazeta	gazette	1605	a small Venetian coin; from the price of early newssheets gazeta de la novità "a penny worth of news"
gheto	ghetto	1611	from Gheto, the area of Cannaregio in Venice that became the first district confined to Jews; named after the foundry or gheto once sited there
njòchi	gnocchi	1891	lumps, bumps, gnocchi; from Germanic knokk- 'knuckle, joint'
góndola	gondola	1549	from Medieval Greek κονδοῦρα
łaguna	lagoon	1612	Latin lacunam "lake"
łazareto	lazaret	1611	through French; a quarantine station for maritime travellers, ultimately from the Biblical Lazarus of Bethany, who was raised from the dead; the first one was on the island of Lazareto Vechio in Venice
łido	lido	1930	Latin litus "shore"; the name of one of the three islands enclosing the Venetian lagoon, now a beach resort
łoto	lotto	1778	Germanic lot- "destiny, fate"
malvazìa	malmsey	1475	ultimately from the name μονοβασία Monemvasia, a small Greek island off the Peloponnese once owned by the Venetian Republic and a source of strong, sweet white wine from Greece and the eastern Mediterranean
marzapan	marzipan	1891	from the name for the porcelain container in which marzipan was transported, from Arabic مَرْطَبَان marṭabān, or from Mataban in the Bay of Bengal where these were made (these are some of several proposed etymologies for the English word)
Montenegro	Montenegro		"black mountain"; country on the Eastern side of the Adriatic Sea
Negroponte	Negroponte		"black bridge"; Greek island called Euboea or Evvia in the Aegean Sea
Pantałon	pantaloon	1590	a character in the Commedia dell'arte
pistacio	pistachio	1533	ultimately from Middle Persian pistak
cuarantena	quarantine	1609	forty day isolation period for a ship with infectious diseases like plague
regata	regatta	1652	originally "fight, contest"
scanpi	scampi	1930	Greek κάμπη "caterpillar", lit. "curved (animal)"
sciao	ciao	1929	cognate with Italian schiavo "slave"; used originally in Venetian to mean "your servant", "at your service"; original word pronounced "s-ciao"
Zani	zany	1588	"Johnny"; a character in the Commedia dell'arte
zechin	sequin	1671	Venetian gold ducat; from Arabic سكّة sikkah "coin, minting die"
ziro	giro	1896	"circle, turn, spin"; adopted in Italianized form; from the name of the bank Banco del Ziro or Bancoziro at Rialto

== See also ==
- Venetian literature
- Venetic language
- Talian dialect
- Chipilo Venetian dialect
- Quatro Ciàcoe – Venetian language magazine

== Bibliography ==
- Artico, Francesco (1976). Tornén un pas indrìo: raccolta di conversazioni in dialetto (in Italian). Brescia: Paideia. ICCU SBL0017230.
- Ferguson, Ronnie (2007). A Linguistic History of Venice. Florence: Leo S. Olschki. ISBN 978-88-222-5645-4.
- McKay, Carolyn Joyce. Il dialetto veneto di Segusino e Chipilo: fonologia, grammatica, lessico veneto, spagnolo, italiano, inglese (in Italian). Segusino: Comune. ICCU VIA0098392.
- Belloni, Silvano (2009). Grammatica veneta (in Italian). Padova: Esedra. ISBN 88-6058-082-X.
- Boerio, Giuseppe (1856). Dizionario del dialetto veneziano (in Italian). Venice: G. Cecchini. p. 937. OCLC 799065043.
