= Chipilo =

- Chipilo de Francisco Javier Mina
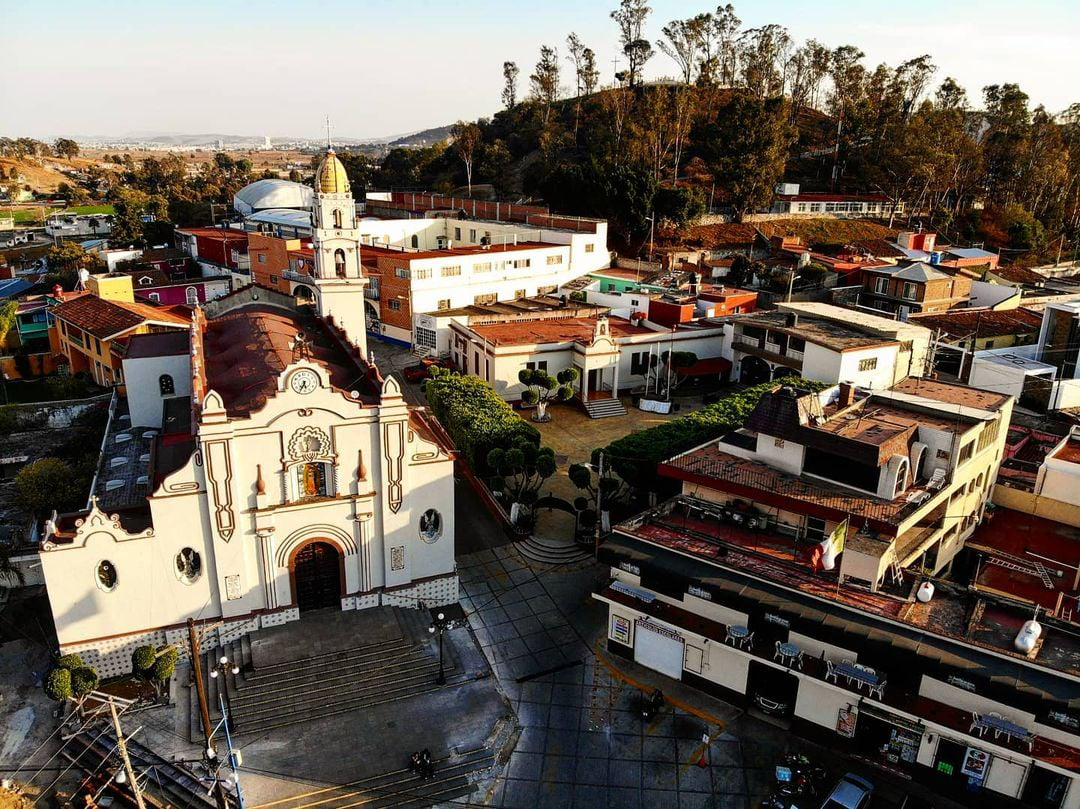
- The Parish of Immaculate Conception from above

- Coat of arms

- Location in Mexico Chipilo (Mexico)
- Coordinates: 19°00′22″N 98°19′50″W
- Country: Mexico
- State: Puebla
- Municipality: San Gregorio Atzompa

Government
  - Mayor: José Avelino Mario Merlo Zanella (2018-2024)

Population (2010)
  - Total: 4,059
- Demonyms: Spanish: chipileño Venetian: cipilegni

Chipilo, officially known as Chipilo de Francisco Javier Mina, is a small city in the state of Puebla, Mexico. It is located 12 kilometres (7 miles) south of the state capital Puebla, Puebla, at a height of 2,150 metres (7,054 feet) above sea level. The name itself derives from Náhuatl, meaning "place of the whiner". The settlement and the parish was fully founded by Italian immigrants from a prior community, in the late 19th century.

== History ==
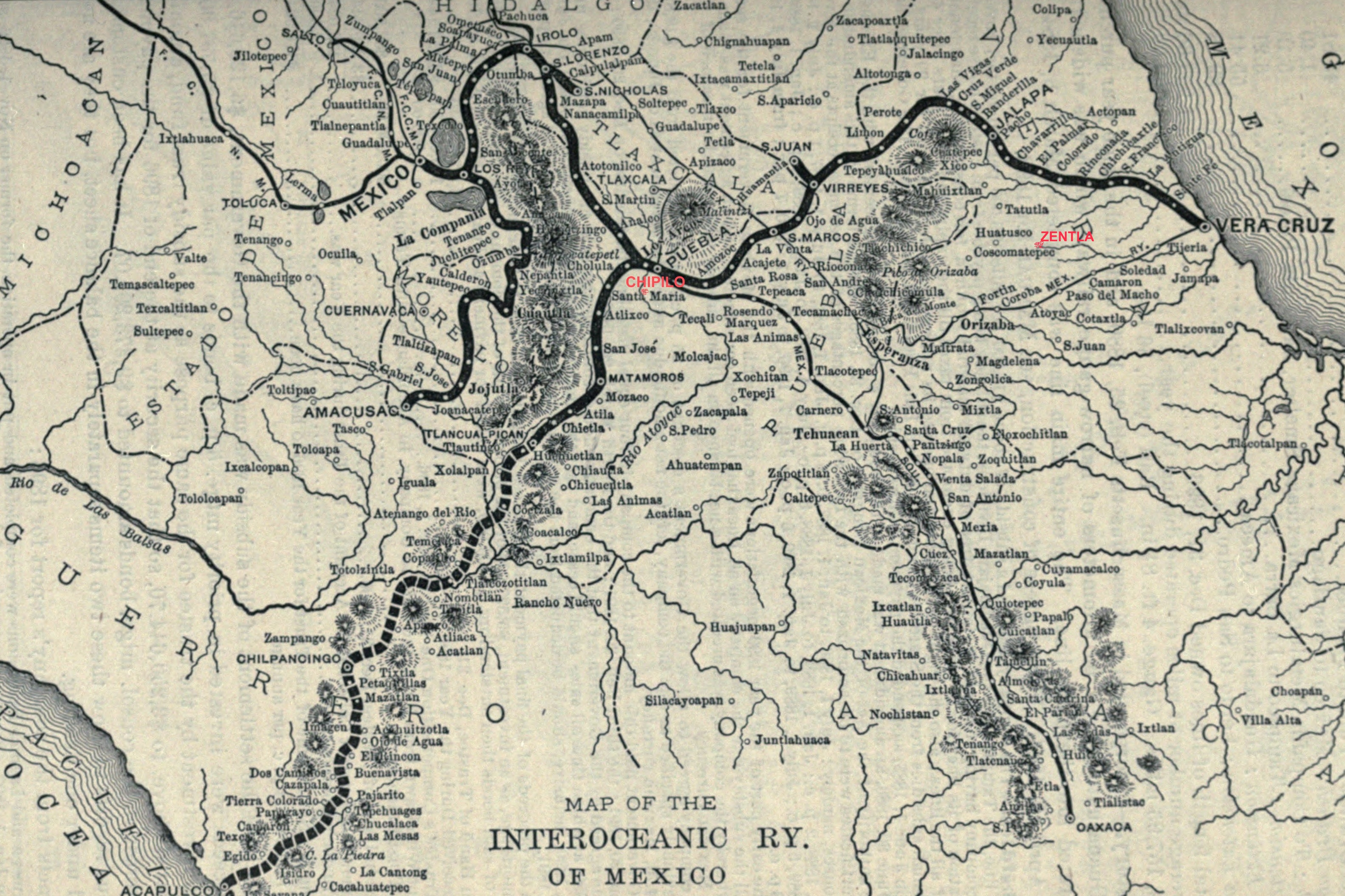
A 1897 map with marked present-day Chipilo location shows present-day settlement near the railway station of Puebla.

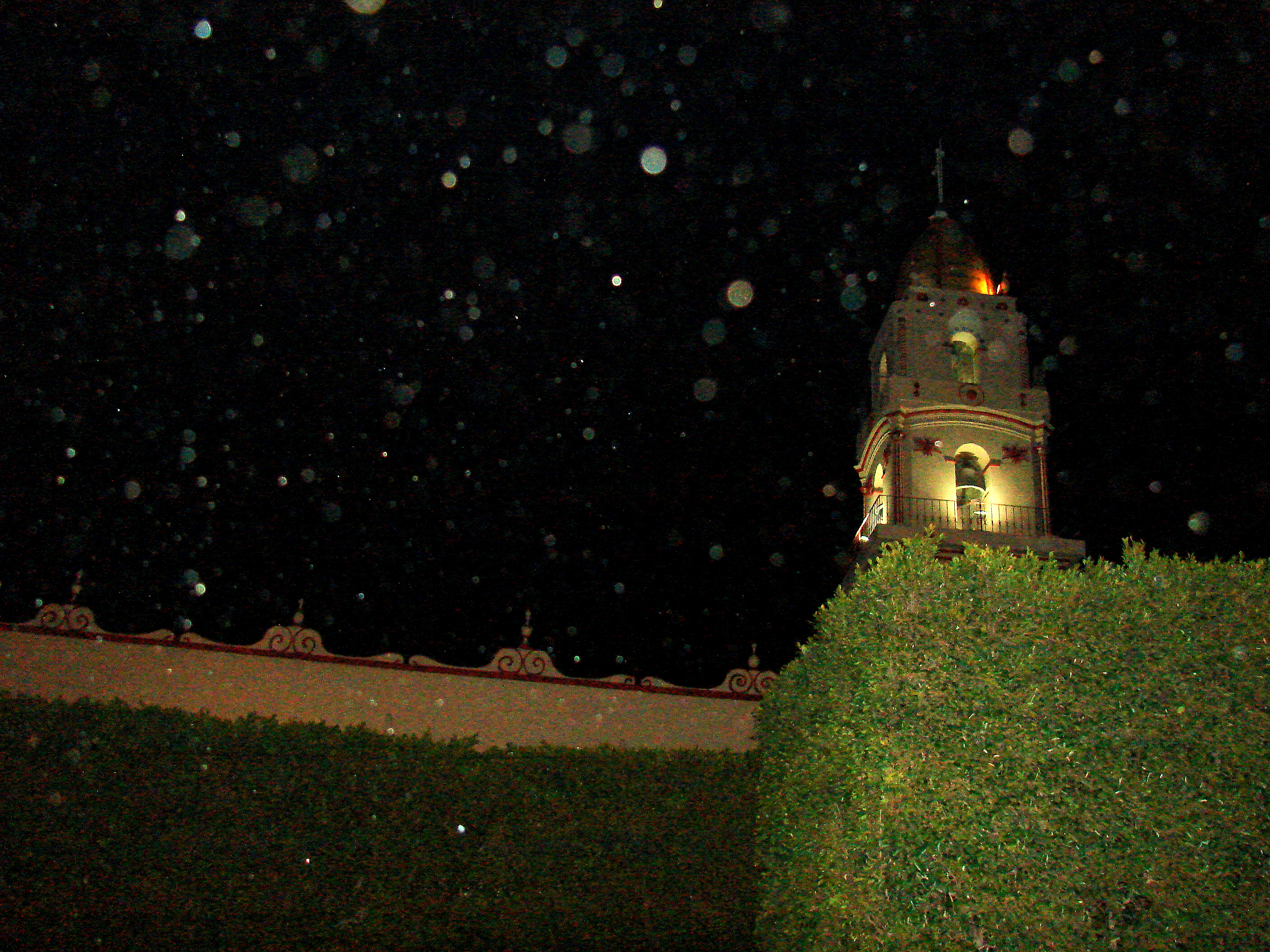
Parish of Immaculate Conception, built by Italians

Chipilo in 1879 was a community named by locals Colonia Fernández Leal, and on October 2, 1882, immigrants from the northern Italian region of Veneto began to settle there. Most came from the town of Segusino and other surrounding towns in the province of Treviso. These immigrants arrived in Mexico in search of fertile land, leaving behind the poverty that was plaguing the Veneto at that time. Most of them took up cattle raising, and the dairy products of Chipilo became famous in Puebla and other regions of central Mexico. In 1899, Chipilo was declared to be a town and the "de Francisco Javier Mina" was added by an administrative order in memory of Martín Francisco Javier Mina y Larrea, but the locals continued to call it simply "Chipilo". Some Italian-Mexicans there continue to speak the Chipilo Venetian dialect derived from the Venetian language. They fiercely defended themselves from the attack of Mexican revolutionaries in 1917.

Although the city of Puebla has grown so far as to almost absorb it, the town of Chipilo remained isolated for much of the 20th century. Thus, the "Chipileños", unlike other Italian immigrants that came to Mexico, did not blend into the Mexican culture and retained most of their traditions and their language. To this day, most of the people in Chipilo speak the Venetian of their great-grandparents. The variant spoken by the Chipileños is the 'northern Feltrino-Bellunese'. Surprisingly, it has been barely altered by Spanish, as compared to how the dialect of the northern region of Veneto has been altered by Italian. Given the number of speakers of Venetian, and even though the state government has not done so, the Chipilo Venetian can be considered a minority language in the conurbation of Puebla.

In 1982, the townspeople of Chipilo celebrated the 100th anniversary of the foundation of the city along with visitors from the Veneto region. During the celebration the city of Segusino, Italy, was declared Chipilo's Twin city.

== Culture ==
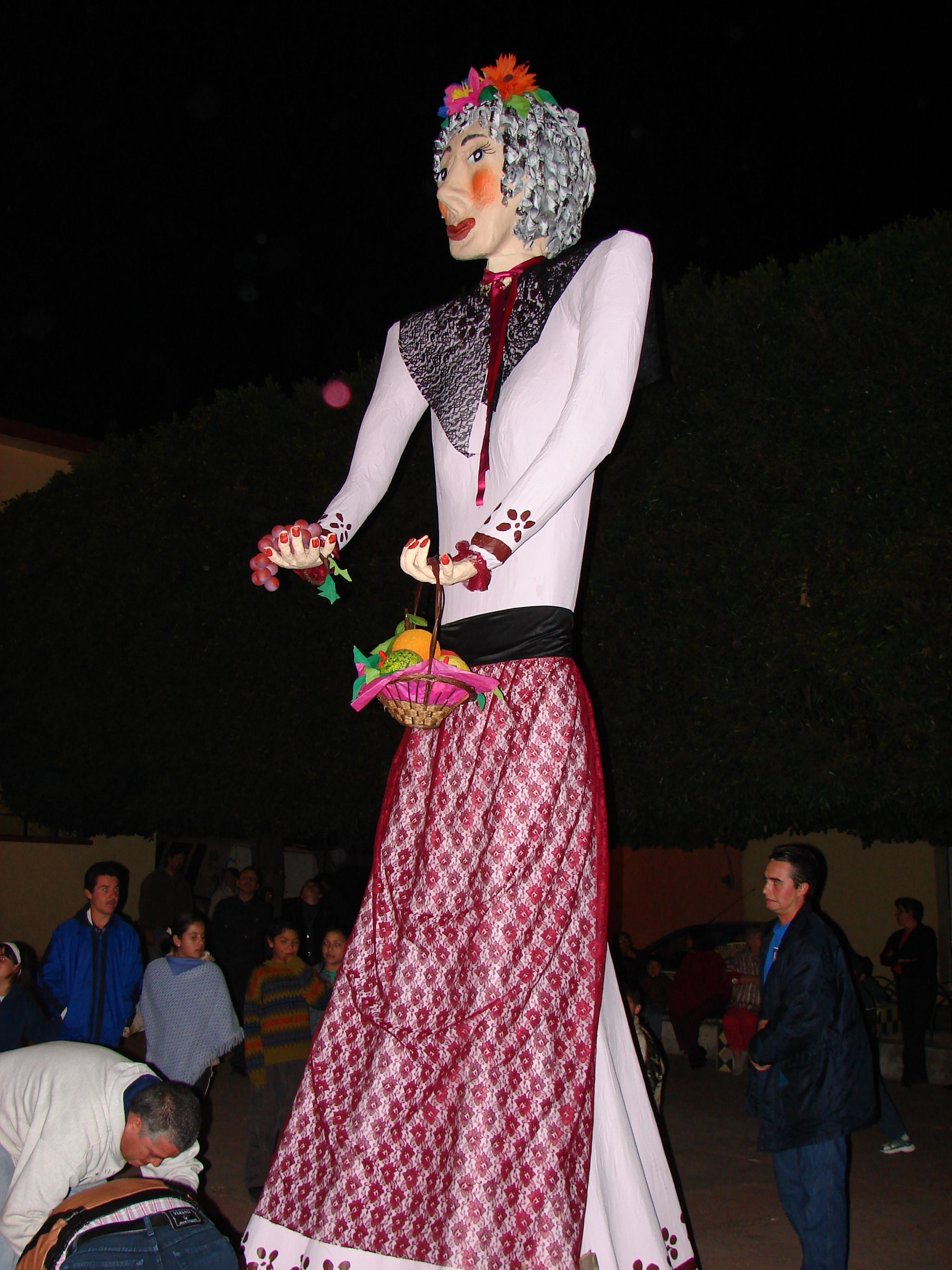
Befana festivities, Chipilo, Puebla.

Chipilo was founded on October 2, 1882, by Italian immigrants from the northern region of Veneto, although there were some people from Piedmont and Lombardy among the founders. They maintained their northern Italian culture.

In the words of a local writer, Eduardo Montagner Anguiano:

Chipilo preserves the features, culture and dialect of the Italian origin. For linguists, Chipilo is a treasure: the rare case of a town that is transported to another country, and that keeps its language and customs almost intact, as they were in the 19th century. To its Mexican neighbors, Chipilo is a strange place of sturdy, blond, red-haired, and unusually thrifty and prosperous peasants. In the streets there are no children playing 'cascaritas', nor police officers; There are no pints or election banners, no trash, and no grocery stores on every corner. There is a Salesian convent, three schools, the Casa de Italia, a library, the presidency, a sausage, cold meat, and cheese shop, and a couple of cafes. There are two Banks, a fleet of relatively new cars, concrete paved streets, and stables and carpentry in the backyard of each house. It is the town of the "güeros" (local nickname of 'Italians'), 2,700 inhabitants, descendants of the 424 immigrants who arrived in 1882.

Most of them came from Segusino and surrounding villages in the provinces of Treviso and Belluno, like Quero, Valdobbiadene, Feltre and Maser.

== People ==
- Eduardo Montagner Anguiano, writer.
- Martín Stefanonni Mazzocco, politician.

== Twin towns – sister cities ==
- (Italy) Segusino, Veneto
- (Mexico) Huatusco, Veracruz

== See also ==
- Chipilo Venetian dialect
- Italian Mexican

== Bibliography ==
- Sbrighi, Lucia (2018), El aumento de las uniones mixtas en Chipilo, México: actitudes y percepción identitaria en una comunidad inmigrante de origen italiano, Cuadernos Aispi, 12: 191–214, ISSN 2283-981X ()

Sbrighi, L., Greathouse Amador, L., Preciado Lloyd (2020), "The New Perception of the Other in Chipilo, Mexico", Lengua y Migración /Language and Migration, ISSN 1889-5425, ISSN-e 2660-7166, Vol. 12, Nº. 1, 2020, p. 7-35
