= Martín Stefanonni Mazzocco =

Mexican lawyer and politician

Martín Stefanonni Mazzocco (born April 30, 1964) is a Mexican lawyer and politician.

Born in the small town of Chipilo, Puebla, to Luis Stefanonni Berra and Librada Mazzocco Piloni, Martín and his family relocated to San Miguel de Allende when he was seven years of age, where he grew up and eventually began his political career. A former member of the National Action Party (PAN), Stefanonni served as a deputy in the Chamber of Deputies from 2006 to 2009, representing Guanajuato's 2nd district for that party, and as a local deputy in the Congress of Guanajuato.

He has since switched parties and is now a member of the recently established Social Encounter Party.
