= Quattro =

Quattro is Italian for the number four.

Quattro may also refer to:

== People ==
- "Quattro", a nickname of A. J. Foyt IV
- Jacqueline de Quattro (born 1960), Swiss politician

=== Fictional characters ===
- Quattro Vageena or Quattro Bageena, an alias of Char Aznable in the Mobile Suit Gundam anime series
- Quattro, a character in Magical Girl Lyrical Nanoha Strikers

== Transportation ==
- Southern Skies Quattro, an American paramotor

=== Audi-related ===
- Audi Quattro, a model of car
- Quattro (four-wheel-drive system), an Audi trademark
- Audi e-tron Quattro (disambiguation)
- Audi Sport GmbH, an Audi private subsidiary company formerly known as "Quattro Gmbh".

== Computing and computer games ==
- Quattro compilations, a series of video game compilations (each with four games) released for the NES in the 1990s
- Borland Quattro and Quattro Pro, spreadsheet applications by Borland
- The Microsoft codename for the Windows Home Server

== Other ==
- Quattro, a range of four-bladed razors from Wilkinson Sword (sold in the U.S. under the Schick brand)
- Adept Quattro, a pick-and-place robot made by Adept Technology

== See also ==
- Quatro (disambiguation)
- Cuatro (disambiguation)
- Quarto (disambiguation)
- Cuarto (disambiguation)
