= Cuarto =

Cuarto is Spanish for "room" and "fourth", and may refer to:

- Cuarto (room), a room
- Cuarto (Ponce), a barrio of the municipality of Ponce, Puerto Rico
- Cuarto River (sometimes even Río Cuarto River, even though río means "river"), a river in Argentina that gave its name to:
  - Río Cuarto, Córdoba
  - Río Cuarto craters, Argentina
- Cuarto milenio, a TV program on the TV channel Cuatro
- Cuarto (coin), an obsolete Spanish coin

== See also ==
- Quarto (disambiguation)
- Cuatro (disambiguation)
- Quatro (disambiguation)
- Quattro (disambiguation)
