= Segusino =

Segusino Seguxin
- Comune
- Comune di Segusino
- The municipal area in the province of Treviso

- Location within Italy Location within Veneto
- Coordinates: 45°55′N 11°57′E
- Country: Italy
- Region: Veneto
- Province: Province of Treviso (TV)
- Frazioni: Col lonc, Stramare, Milies

Area
  - Total: 18.1 km^{2} (7.0 sq mi)
- Elevation: 219 m (719 ft)

Population (Dec. 2021)
  - Total: 1,823
  - Density: 101/km^{2} (261/sq mi)
- Demonym: Segusinesi
- Time zone: UTC+1 (CET)
  - Summer (DST): UTC+2 (CEST)
- Postal code: 31040
- Dialing code: 0423
- Website: Official website

Segusino (Venetian: Seguxin) is a comune (municipality) in the province of Treviso in the Italian region Veneto, located about 60 kilometres (37 mi) northwest of Venice and about 35 kilometres (22 mi) northwest of Treviso. As of 31 December 2017, it had a population of 1,833 and an area of 18.1 square kilometres (7.0 mi^{2}).

The municipality of Segusino contains the frazioni (subdivisions, mainly villages and hamlets) Col lonc, Stramare and Milies.

Segusino borders the municipalities of Setteville in the province of Belluno, and Valdobbiadene in the province of Treviso.

Segusino is sister town of Chipilo, Mexico, whose residents are descendants of Segusino immigrants and who to this date still speak the Venetan language of the region.

== Brief history ==
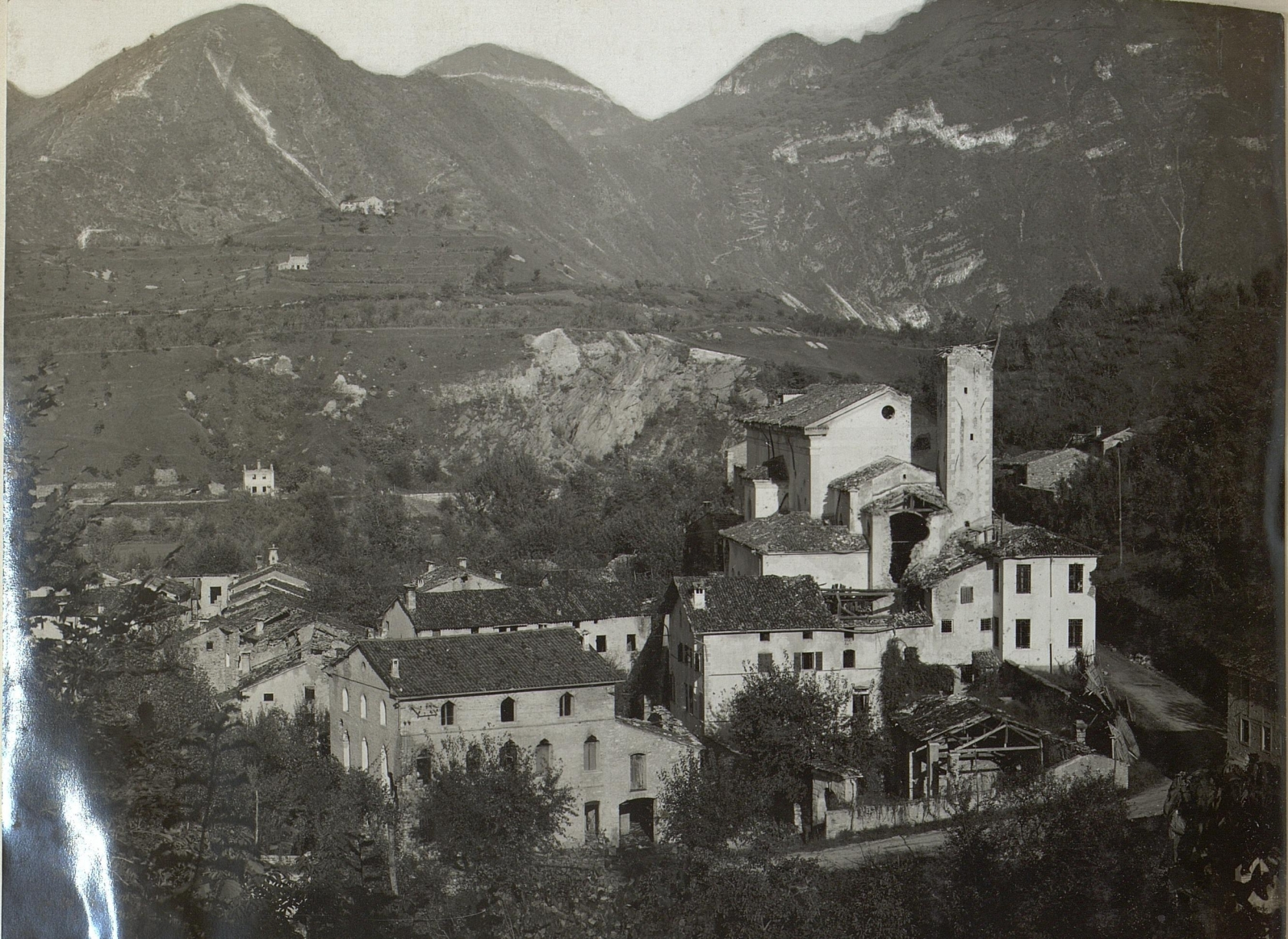
Partial view of Segusino in 1918

In 1297 it was established as an autonomous parish, first depending on the parish church of S. Maria di Quero. The key place of Segusino was the castle of Mirabello, located in a strategic position on the border with Valdobbiadene. Today nothing remains of the castle but some written testimony, including a parchment dating back to 1192. In 1358 Segusino was enfeoffed by the Counts of Collalto. Napoleon, on the other hand, separated Segusino from Quero (BL) then belonging to the Treviso district and joined the Valdobbiadene district. Segusino was able to have full autonomy only with the annexation of Veneto to the Kingdom of Italy, in 1866.The center of Segusino, located in a pleasant foothill landscape, is pleasantly enriched by suggestive churches and oratories. The Parish Church of S. Lucia has been completely restored after the devastation suffered during the First World War. The Great War erased a large part of Segusino's historical-artistic memory. From the retreat of Caporetto when the front moved to the Piave, the population was forced to take refuge in the Vittoriese, especially in Fregona.

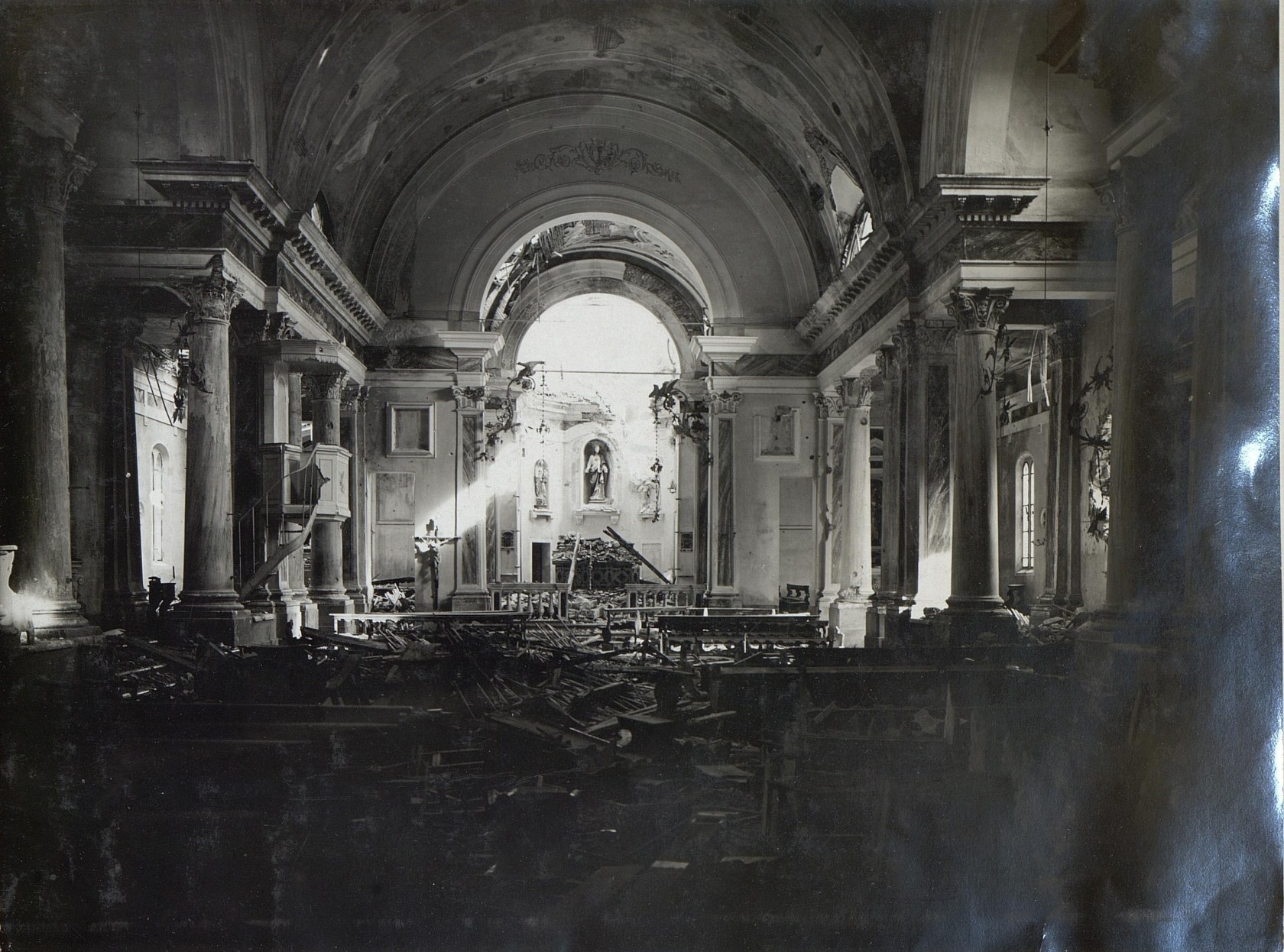
Interior of the Segusino Church in 1918

== Economy ==
A village with an agricultural-peasant tradition already in the 1600/1700 centuries, quantities of wood and coal were obtained from the woods behind Monte Zogo (Doc), which was traded. The Piave often flooded the land at the bottom of the valley, making them almost uncultivable and the slope was exploited above all for grazing: cattle were its main resource, so much so that even today, during the last weekend of October, it takes place in Segusino the cattle show as part of the centuries-old Franca del Rosario Fair. Over time the country experienced important migratory phenomena, first of all that towards Mexico (1882), but also to other countries of America, of Europe (especially France, Switzerland, Belgium) and subsequently also to Australia, Canada and Africa. At the end of the World War I, they immediately worked hard and tenaciously to rebuild. In the 1960s / 70s of the twentieth century, many emigrants returned home with such a wealth of experience and wealth that they transformed the small rural village into a lively industrial center with economic, social and cultural development.

The role of Captain Guglielmo Zancaner was fundamental. In 1946 he set up the first eyewear factory in the town center (the “Filos”) capable of offering various jobs. From here, new residential and production buildings were built and the urban plan expanded. With the leading eyewear sector and the acquired specialization, several workers themselves became protagonists entrepreneurs, giving life to a dizzying multiplication of workshops, then imitated in the following years also by the neighboring municipalities. Despite having suffered from the international crisis that opened the third millennium, Segusino is still rich in craftsmanship and industry: from eyewear, to chandeliers, to clothing.

The typical products of the place are: first of all the S-cèch cheese: it is a fresh, soft cheese made from raw and salty drained milk. Over time, however, the name S-cèch has also been extended to more aged cheeses, taking on a more typically denomination of cheese produced in the Segusino area. In recent years, many other food and wine products are also returning to vogue, ranging from sausages, local variety of potatoes, jams, goat cheese, black truffles and many other products of the earth, strictly "Made in Segusino". Last, but not least, the cultivation of Glera grapes used for the production of Prosecco D.O.C. from the influence of the nearby Valdobbiadene. There are also numerous family-run farms, ranging from the production of cow's and goat's milk derivatives, to the breeding of pigs, geese, rabbits, chickens, and even particular and precious sheep from wool and yarn.

== Culture ==
=== Events ===
- Ancient "Franca del Rosario" Fair in autumn
- Parish festival of Santa Lucia
- Discovering the nativity scenes and villages of Segusino, Christmas markets
- Returning to the DOC, 2 June: non-competitive mountain run (13 km at Milies di Segusino)
- Extreme Badalis: pairs ski mountaineering race, organized by the Valdobbiadene ski club (start and finish at Milies di Segusino).
- Beer Festival in summer

=== Storytelling ===
Part of the historical novel and Italian bestseller "Oltre le stelle" by the Lazio novelist Antonio Valerio Fontana is set in Segusino.

The novel "Wasere cuore di drago" by the writer Gian Berra tells of a story set in Segusino in the years preceding the First World War.

== Demographic evolution ==
Historical population

Year	Pop.	±%
1861	?	—
1871	1,823	—
1881	1,985	+8.9%
1901	1,961	−1.2%
1911	2,256	+15.0%
1921	2,273	+0.8%

Year	Pop.	±%
1931	2,236	−1.6%
1936	1,930	−13.7%
1951	1,966	+1.9%
1961	1,834	−6.7%
1971	1,942	+5.9%
1981	2,022	+4.1%

Year	Pop.	±%
1991	2,019	−0.1%
2001	1,980	−1.9%
2011	1,941	−2.0%
2021	1,823	−6.1%

Source: Data from ISTAT

== Ethnicities and foreign minorities ==
As of 31 December 2021, foreigners residing in the municipality were 152, or 8.3% of the population. The following are the most consistent groups:

1. Morocco 49
2. China 32
3. Romania 15
4. North Macedonia 12
