= Cuatro =

Cuatro, Spanish (and other Romance languages) for the number 4, may refer to:

- Cuatro (instrument), a family of Latin American string instrument, including:
  - Cuatro (Venezuela)
  - Puerto Rican cuatro
- Cuatro (TV channel), a Spanish free-to-air television channel
- TV4 (Guanajuato), or TV Cuatro, a state-owned public broadcaster serving Guanajuato, Mexico
- ¡Cuatro!, a 2013 documentary by Green Day
- Cuatro, a 1994 album by Flotsam and Jetsam

== See also ==
- Cuarto (disambiguation)
- Quatro (disambiguation)
- Quattro (disambiguation)
