= Dialogo de Cecco di Ronchitti da Bruzene in perpuosito de la stella Nuova =

Early 17th-century pseudonymous pamphlet

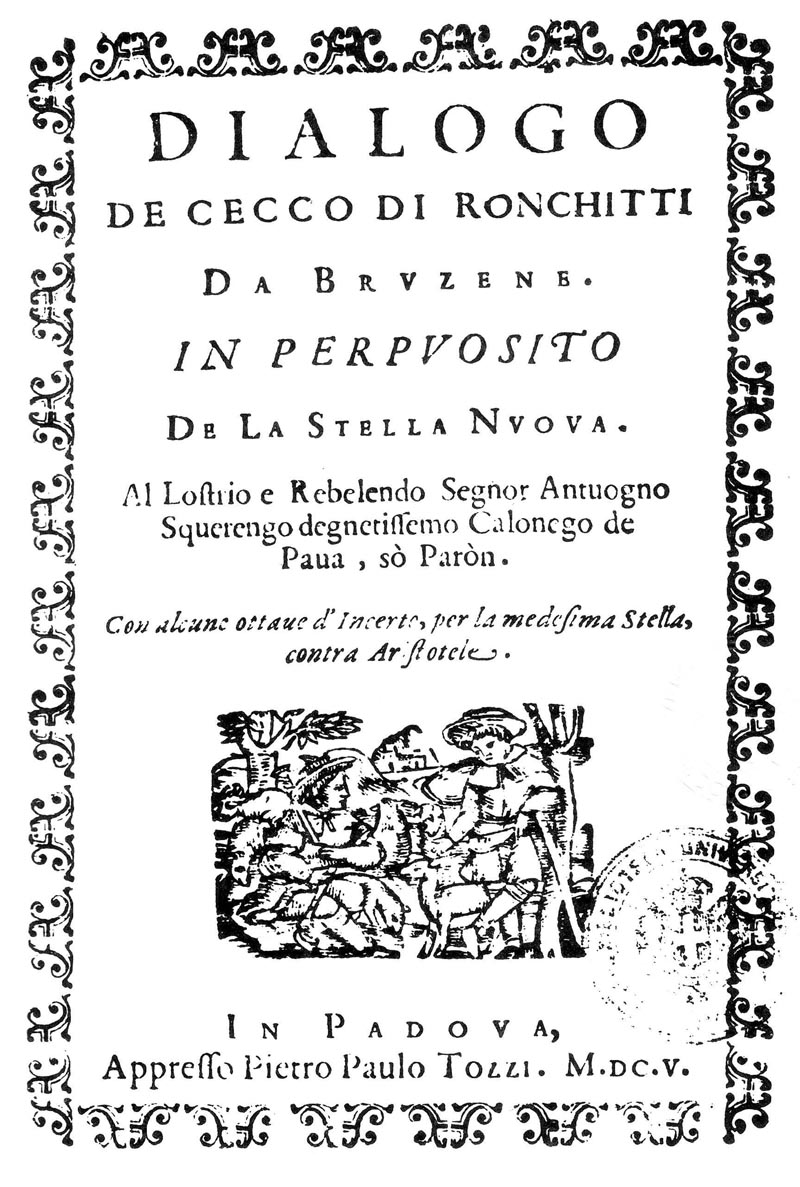
- Title page of first (Paduan) edition
- Author: attributed to Galileo Galilei or Girolamo Spinelli or both as co-authors
- Original title: Dialogo de Cecco di Ronchitti da Bruzene in perpuosito de la stella Nuova
- Language: Paduan dialect
- Published: 1605 by Pietro Paolo Tozzi, Padua (1st ed.); 1605 by Bartolomeo Merlo, Verona (2nd ed.)
- Original text: Dialogo de Cecco di Ronchitti da Bruzene in perpuosito de la stella Nuova at the Open library

Dialogo de Cecco di Ronchitti da Bruzene in perpuosito de la stella Nuova (Dialogue of Cecco di Ronchitti of Brugine concerning the New star) is the title of an early 17th-century pseudonymous pamphlet ridiculing the views of an aspiring Aristotelian philosopher, Antonio Lorenzini da Montepulciano, on the nature and properties of Kepler's Supernova, which had appeared in October 1604. The pseudonymous Dialogue was written in the coarse language of a rustic Paduan dialect, and first published in about March, 1605, in Padua. A second edition was published later the same year in Verona. Antonio Favaro republished the contents of the pamphlet in its original language in 1881, with annotations and a commentary in Italian. He republished it again in Volume 2 of the National Edition of Galileo's works in 1891, along with a translation into standard Italian. An English translation was published by Stillman Drake in 1976.

The Dialogo is dedicated to Antonio Querenghi. Scholars agree that the pamphlet was written either by Galileo Galilei or one of his followers, Girolamo Spinelli, or by both in collaboration, but do not agree on the extent of the contribution—if any—made by each of them to its composition.

== Bibliography ==
- Drake, Stillman; Galilei, Galileo; Spinelli, Girolamo (1976), Galileo against the Philosophers, Los Angeles: Zeitlin & Ver Brugge
- Favaro, Antonio [in Italian]; Galilei, Galileo; Spinelli, Girolamo (1881), "Galileo Galilei ed il «Dialogo de Cecco di Ronchitti da Bruzene in perpuosito de la Stella Nuova»" [Galileo Galilei and the "Dialogue of Cecco di Ronchitti of Brugine concerning the New Star"], Atti del Reale Istituto Veneto di Scienze, Lettere ed Arti, vol. 7 (in Italian), ser. 5: 195–276
- Favaro, Antonio [in Italian], ed. (1891), Le Opere di Galileo Galilei, Edizione Nazionale, vol. 2, Florence: G. Barbèra
- Peruzzi, Giulio (2010). "A New Physics to Support the Copernican System: Gleanings from Galileo's Works" (PDF). Proceedings of the International Astronomical Union. 6 (S269): 20–26.
