= Quatro Ciàcoe =

Monthly periodical in Venetian language, established in 1981

Quatro Ciàcoe is a monthly cultural periodical in the Venetian language, established in 1982. The magazine is based in Padua.

The monthly, non-political and non-partisan, deals with Venetian culture and traditions. For many years Manlio Cortelazzo, emeritus professor of Italian dialectology at the Faculty of Letters of the University of Padua, wrote the column "Linguistic Observatory: Chronicles in dialect". Since his death in 2009, the column has been written by his son Michele Cortelazzo, a professor at the department of linguistic and literary studies at the University of Padua.
