= Enrique Krauze =

Mexican historian (born 1947)

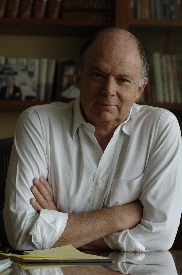
- Krauze in 2008
- Born: Enrique Krauze Kleinbort; 16 September 1947 (age 79); Mexico City, Mexico
- Education: National Autonomous University of Mexico (BS); El Colegio de México (PhD)
- Children: 2 (including León)
- Relatives: Ethel Krauze (cousin)

Enrique Krauze Kleinbort (born 16 September 1947) is a Mexican essayist, editor, and entrepreneur. He has written more than twenty books, some of which are: Mexico: Biography of Power, Redeemers, and El pueblo soy yo (I am the people). He has also produced more than 500 television programs and documentaries about Mexico's history. His biographical, historical works, and his political and literary essays, which have reached a broad audience, have made him famous.

== Life and career ==
He received his bachelor's degree in Industrial Engineering from the National Autonomous University of Mexico (1965-1969). He received a Doctorate in History from the Center of Historical Studies in El Colegio de México (1969-1974). He is a member of the Mexican Academy of History and the Mexican National College (El Colegio Nacional). He is also director of the publishing house Clío and director of Letras Libres, a cultural magazine. The Engineering Faculty shortly before the start of Mexican Movement of 1968 elected him university councillor. In 1979 he obtained the Guggenheim Fellowship.

He has been a professor and researcher for El Colegio de México in 1977; guest professor at St Antony's College, Oxford, from October to December in 1981 and 1983; guest professor at Woodrow Wilson International Center for Scholars, from October to December 1987. Similarly, he was visiting professor at Princeton University’s Program in Latin American Studies in the autumn of 2013.

At 24 years old, he obtained his first publication in Siempre! magazine, titled: “La saña y el terror” (“The viciousness and terror”), which tells of the Corpus Christi Thursday Massacre (which he witnessed). A year later he started to collaborate at Plural, Excélsior’s monthly cultural magazine. He started working at Vuelta in 1977, invited by Octavio Paz. He collaborated at Vuelta for more than 20 years, first as an editorial secretary from 1977 to 1981 and then as deputy director from 1981 to 1996.

In 1991 he launched the publishing house and television producer Clío, of which he is the director. Since 1999, after Octavio Paz’s death, he has directed Vuelta’s cultural heir: Letras Libres, with editions in Mexico, Spain, and online. Since 1985 he has been an editorial writer for The New Republic, The New York Review of Books, The New York Times, El País, and Reforma.

In 1990 he was elected member at the Mexican Academy of History and since 2005 he is a member of the Colegio Nacional in Mexico. Among other tasks, he has been a member of the board of directors at the Instituto Cervantes. Likewise, he has held various positions on the boards of directors of other companies and institutions.

== Works ==
=== Books ===
- Caudillos culturales en la Revolución mexicana (1976), Siglo XXI Editores.
- Historia de la Revolución Mexicana. La reconstrucción económica. 1924-1928 (1977), El Colegio de México.
- Daniel Cosío Villegas: una biografía intelectual (1980), Joaquín Mortiz.
- Caras de la historia (1983), Joaquín Mortiz.
- Por una democracia sin adjetivos (1986), Joaquín Mortiz-Planeta.
- Biografía del poder, eight volumes: I. “Porfirio Díaz. Místico de la autoridad”; II. “Francisco I. Madero. Místico de la libertad”; III. “Emiliano Zapata. El amor a la tierra”; IV. “Francisco Villa. Entre el ángel y el fierro”; V. “Venustiano Carranza. Puente entre siglos”; VI. “Álvaro Obregón. El vértigo de la victoria”; VII. “Plutarco Elías Calles. Reformar desde el origen”; VIII. “Lázaro Cárdenas. General misionero” (1987), Fondo de Cultura Económica.
- Personas e ideas (1989), Vuelta.
- América Latina: el otro milagro (1991), Fundes.
- Textos heréticos (1992), Grijalbo.
- Siglo de caudillos: Biografía Política de México (1810-1910), (1994), Tusquets.
- Tiempo contado (1996), Océano.
- Mexico: Biography of Power: A History of Modern Mexico, 1810-1996 (1997), HarperCollins Publishers.
- La presidencia imperial (1997), Tusquets.
- La Historia cuenta (1998), Tusquets.
- Mexicanos eminentes (1999), Tusquets.
- Tarea política (2000), Tusquets.
- Travesía liberal (2003), Tusquets.
- La presencia del pasado (2005), Tusquets.
- Para salir de Babel (2006), Tusquets.
- Retratos personales (2007), Tusquets.
- El poder y el delirio (2008), Tusquets.
- De héroes y mitos (2010), Tusquets.
- Redeemers: Ideas and power in Latin America (2011), HarperCollins.
- Redentores: Ideas y poder en América Latina (2011), Random House.
- El arte de la biografía (2012), Random House.
- Octavio Paz. El poeta y la revolución (2014), Random House.
- Personas e ideas. Conversaciones sobre historia y literatura (2015), Debate.
- Caras de la historia I (2015), Debate.
- El nacimiento de las instituciones (2015), Tusquets.
- Por una democracia sin adjetivos, 1982-1996 (2016), Debate.
- Del desencanto al mesianismo, 1996-2006 (2016), Debate.
- Democracia en construcción, 2006-2016 (2016), Debate
- Caras de la historia II (2016), Debate.
- México: Biografía del poder (2017), Tusquets.
- El pueblo soy yo (2018), Debate.

His essays have been collected by the Debate label of Penguin Random House Editorial Group in the Liberal Essayist collection, while his historical works are part of Enrique Krauze’s Historical Library series by Tusquets Editores.

=== Television ===
In his article titled "La misión de la televisión" (“Television’s mission”), published in 2013 in Reforma, Krauze quotes his stance on this media that he has been tied to for three decades:

It’s not that, of course, television should take SEP’s place. Or that it should stop producing highly rated programs. It is, indeed, about television assuming a larger civic responsibility by producing high-level content, lasting programs recognized internationally […]. And, it is also about stimulating Mexico’s democratic culture. […] Television could be a splendid forum so public figures and citizens in general (students, scholars, business, military, and religious people, workers, and farmers) can debate (not just talk) about urgent subjects on our public agenda.

He debuted on television in 1987 as the author of the series Biografía del Poder (Biography of Power), produced by the Film Production Center, and transmitted through the state’s network Imevisión. The following year he served as an advisor for the series Mexico, produced by Public Broadcasting Service (WGBH) in association with Blackwell Corporation from Boston.

Along with Fausto Zerón-Medina in 1994, he wrote a soap opera titled El vuelo del águila (The Eagle's Flight) based on Porfirio Díaz’s life, produced by Ernesto Alonso for Televisa, starring Fabián Robles (young Porfirio Díaz), Humberto Zurita (Porfirio Díaz), and Manuel Ojeda (old Porfirio Díaz). Krauze is a producer of documental series México siglo XX, México nuevo siglo y Clío TV presenta since 1998, broadcast weekly on open television through Televisa’s network.

=== Film ===
Along with Alvin H. Perlmutter, Krauze produced Beyond Borders, Undocumented Mexican Americans (2016) directed by Micah Fink, co-produced by The Independent Production Fund (US), Clío (Mexico), and La Fábrica de Cine (Mexico). He is also the executive producer of the documentary El pueblo soy yo, Venezuela en populismo by director Carlos Oteyza (2018).

=== Clío ===
Editorial Clío, Libros y Videos, S.A. de C.V., was born in 1991 by the initiative of Emilio Azcárraga Milmo and Enrique Krauze as a project aimed at disseminating the past and present of Mexico that, in its name, pays tribute to the muse of history.

Originally conceived as a publishing house, since 1998 it began the production of documentaries that through its series Clío TV presenta and Hazaña, el deporte vive, reach hundreds of thousands of homes weekly through open broadcasting throughout the country and other national and international media.

Throughout its history, Clío has published nearly 200 printed titles and has broadcast more than 500 documentaries.

=== Vuelta ===
Enrique Krauze published his first article in Vuelta magazine, directed by the poet Octavio Paz, in its first issue corresponding to December 1976 ("Cosío Villegas and Excélsior"). In 1977, starting from the fourth issue, Krauze was hired as the editorial secretary. From 1981 to 1996 he held the position of deputy director, his participation being indispensable from an operative point of view since he dedicated most of his time to moving Vuelta forward as a company, which allowed it to reach a long existence by giving it continuity and economic independence. In Vuelta more than 60 articles saw the light throughout twenty years, among them the controversial “Por una democracia sin adjetivos” ("For a Democracy without Adjectives") and “La comedia mexicana de Carlos Fuentes” (Carlos Fuentes’ Mexican Comedy), which discussed Mexican democracy and literature.

=== Letras Libres ===
After Octavio Paz’s death, on April 19, 1998, Vuelta ended its cycle and Enrique Krauze undertook the organization of its successor: the monthly magazine Letras Libres, which published its first issue in January 1999. Two years later, in October 2001, he added a Spanish edition (that received the National Prize for Promoting Reading in Spain in 2014) to the Mexican edition.

Letras Libres has published 254 issues up to February 2020 (221 in the Spanish edition), which according to the magazine, “calls the brightest minds to tackle, in its pages, urgent and necessary subjects of global debate, and at the same time offers readers samples of the best prose and poetry.”

== Critical Review of Power ==
Enrique Krauze has named himself a critic of power, of presidential power to be precise, that has been exercised itself in Mexico as authoritarian throughout decades. His historical works Siglo de caudillos, Biografía del poder, and, especially, La presidencia imperial (The Imperial Presidency) can be interpreted as a critical review of power and its exploits, since the War of Independence until Carlos Salinas de Gortari’s government.

His essay “El timón y la tormenta” (“The Rudder and the Storm”), published by Vuelta in October 1982, alluded to the president José López Portillo’s phrase when Mexico fell into a deep financial crisis: “I am responsible for the rudder, not the storm”. In it, he criticized the current six-year term’s abuses, its rash economic policies, its irresponsibility by not admitting its part in the shipwreck, the “oil pharaonism”, the generalized corruption, and the lack of leadership during the crisis, marking Mexico’s only historical option to “respect and exercise political liberty, rights, and above all, democracy”.

Following that text he published “Por una democracia sin adjetivos” (“For a Democracy without Adjectives”) (Vuelta 86, January 1984), during the president Miguel de la Madrid Hurtado’s term, where he proposed that democracy was a simulation in the country:

The point is to start at all fronts and understand […] that democracy is not the solution to all our problems, but a way -the least bad, the least unjust- to solve them. If, as the examples demonstrate, democracy is not a bad vaccine against great corruption, the argument that a greater opening would delay the economic recovery also does not make sense. Limits, parties, and press can help its revitalization, although they operate in different spheres. Democracy produces dignity, not difference”.

“For a Democracy without Adjectives’” received a rebuttal from the government through Manuel Camacho Solís (who published on Vuelta’s 90th issue in May 1984: “The Democratic Battle”), and produced a controversy with other intellectuals like Rolando Cordera, Carlos Bazdresch, Rafael Segovia, Manuel Aguilar Mora, and Eduardo Valle.

About Carlos Salinas de Gortari’s government, in his article “Neoconservatives” (Reforma, April 21st, 1996), Krauze said that “the privatizations and the North American Free Trade Agreement where coherent measures in the world we live in”, an open and modern world. But he points out that Salinas “implemented a lot of [those measures] in a vertical, despotic, discretional, and capricious manner”. Krauze saw “those reforms’ purpose” as “the only possible at the end of the XX Century”, in front of the socialist project, that had already crumbled. The approval of these economic policies, however, was not the same in the political landscape:

In essays, articles, declarations, and radio interviews, some of us insist on describing the obvious parallel [of Salinas’ government] with the Porfirian regime. Time confirmed it. Salinas proposed change until the change was upon him, in a sense not unlike the legendary dictator.

== Controversies ==
Criticism towards Krauze has its origin in different aspects of his work. One of them is a reproach to the Academy for its theory of history, exacerbation, self-referential quotes, the majestic “us”, and his elaborate style (as seen in “UNAM and Bicentenary. Historic Delirium”, Letras Libres 108, December 2007).) Similarly, his interest in historic essays and divulgation of history through more accessible formats, like illustrated books and television documentaries. Another is his liberal conviction, which he tackled since the 1980s not only with the PRI regime’s officialdom but with ample left-wing sectors that didn’t commune with his vision of democracy. About the subject, Gabriel Zaid wrote:

Krauze defended Por una democracia sin adjetivos (1986). The book resonated greatly, although it was labeled as neoliberal by believers of a redeeming, benefactor, sovereign State, and, of course, held by politically correct hands. He proposed to limit the state’s intervention, subject it to the free press’ criticism, hold it accountable, and hold real elections. He also proposed a presidency subject to the other powers. He proposed things that are now normal but did not exist in Mexico’s past.

About Krauze’s popularity, literary critic Christopher Domínguez Michael has written:

Krauze has become a popular historian in most of the best meanings of the term. From Caudillos culturales en la Revolución mexicana (1977) to Siglo de caudillos (1994), Krauze has come from fulfilling his academic quota to passionately fulfill the obligations imposed by himself as a historian read by thousands of Mexicans. Krauze became popular by sustaining his political opinions, which were, if not heretic, at least irritating at the center of a political and intellectual class numbed through Marxists dogmas, or by bureaucratic recipes fed by the PRI regime”

Historian Claudio Lomnitz has pointed out his biographic inclination: "The biographies of power written by Enrique Krauze argue that in Mexico, psychology and the president’s personality have determined the course of history”. Krauze on the other hand, has pointed out that it is undoubtedly “impossible to reduce history to a biography”, but “without biography, there is no history”, and that “his attention to the individual does not come from a cultist reverence to heroes, but from a conviction that people in history matter just as much or more than the vast impersonal forces and collective entities”.

In recent decades, his portrayal of Andrés Manuel López Obrador as a populist has generated a strong reaction among his supporters. As a defender of the process of democratization that Mexico started to live at the end of the 1980s (which had its most important milestones in 1997 with the first Congress election dominated by the opposition, and candidate Cuauhtémoc Cárdenas Solórzano elected as mayor of Mexico City (Distrito Federal), as well as with the election of the first president in 71 years in the year 2000 not from the official party, Vicente Fox Quesada), shortly before the 2006 Mexican general election, Krauze published the essay “The Tropical Messiah” (Letras Libres 57, June 2006), where he criticized López Obrador’s attitudes as “popular and populist, charismatic leader, messianic, provincialist, authoritative, with little regard for the law", which he perceived as an autocratic temptation to dissolve Mexican democratic institutions, including non-reelection.

The essay elicited controversy, and Krauze was accused as part of the “Dirty War” against the presidential candidate from Tabasco. In an interview after the elections, López Obrador called Krauze a “reactionary lump totally devoted to the right-wing”. Some of the historian’s critics, like Víctor M. Toledo, rated the essay as an “ideological montage made to generate fear” with racial prejudice:

The essayist not only adopted a clear ideological and political position (and the sin is not in the entrenchment but the validity of his arguments), but also orchestrated a literary piece where the final message is once again the exacerbation of “tropical passion” as a cause of disarray, in this case, the supposed destruction of democracy, or to quote him: “the derailment of the democracy train”. An exemplary piece of subliminal manipulation of an unconscious perception created throughout history, Krauze Kleinbort’s essay is at the height of new psycho-political creations generated from the Pentagon or from the new powerful churches to influence and manipulate citizens’ minds.

In response, Krauze pointed out that Toledo’s interpretation left out “any reference to the medullar subject of the essay, AMLO’s messianism”, pointing out that the “tropical” adjective and the aspects of Tabascan temperamental characterization came from López Obrador’s books. Toledo retorted that it was questionable that Krauze decided to draw a “psychological and biographical portrait” of the candidate “instead of writing a convincing review of his ideas and political proposals”, asking himself if that hadn’t been “another piece of the politically immoral war of personal disqualification”.

In 2007, historian Lorenzo Meyer accused him in Proceso of being one of the intellectuals that spread fear among the citizens during the electoral process of the year before. Krauze answered that the electorate had responded by itself only punishing López Obrador.

In his book La mafia nos robó la presidencia (The Mob Stole our Presidency) (Grijalbo, 2007), Andrés Manuel López Obrador referred once again to the historian:

One of these obstinate defenders of the right-wing is, without a doubt, Enrique Krauze. He devoted himself to attacking me: he labeled me as messianic because I expressed that Mexico needed a sharp renovation, a real purification of public life.

Nevertheless, in March 2012, during his second campaign for the presidency (that set out with a more moderate and less randy profile than the 2006 campaign), López Obrador met up with Krauze at a private dinner, where he told him:

We have been unfair to you. You are a liberal, democrat, you defended the vote in Chihuahua, you opposed Salinas. And I will never forget when you defended me publicly when they said I looked like Hitler.

Remembering the encounter during his third and final campaign, in May 2018, Krauze sentenced: "to my regret, I feel that the portrait I painted of him in ‘The Tropical Messiah’ has only been confirmed over time”.

After López Obrador's victory in the 2018 general election, Enrique Krauze was the target of criticism from some government officials. The first was the accusation from Tatiana Clouthier Carrillo, López Obrador's campaign coordinator, in her book Juntos hicimos historia (Together, we made History) (Penguin Random House, 2019), of a campaign led by business interest groups and intellectuals to avoid López Obrador's rise to power through social media manipulation, in which Krauze should have been included. The story was told with more detail in the newspaper Eje Central on March 14, 2019, which named the campaign Berlin Operation. Krauze denied all allegations in the Reforma newspaper where he demonstrated that he was not in Mexico City at the time the anonymous source (later identified as Ricardo Sevilla) told of a personal encounter with the historian. President López Obrador seemed to stop this affair when he expressed:

We don’t want the controversy, Enrique Krauze is a good historian, and he has a political view not akin to ours, but deserves all of our respect.

Later, in May 2019, the Republic's Presidential Social Communication Administration published a partial list of payments made by the Federal Government between 2013 and 2018 to "media and journalists" (in which, for example, were missing the payments made to broadcasters), which included information on Krauze, Clío, and Letras Libres, to point them out as beneficiaries of less than transparent contributions from previous administrations. Clío and Letras Libres published clarifications that marked the reason for said payments, the publicity services, and production services made, and the lack of representation of those amounts compared to the total amount the government spent on official publicity.

On June 4, 2020, the government of the state of Jalisco battled strong protests in the city of Guadalajara. The complaint was due to the assassination of Giovanni López in the previous month, after being detained and beaten by the municipal police of Ixtlahuacán de los Membrillos, for allegedly not wearing a facemask during the COVID-19 pandemic lockdown. After separating himself from the crime (arguing that the municipal police was not under his control), governor Enrique Alfaro Ramírez accused president Andrés Manuel López Obrador and his party, Morena, of being behind the protests. The next day, Enrique Krauze wrote a tweet defending Alfaro's denouncement of intromission from the federal government in the protests:

Governor Enrique Alfaro honors Jalisco’s liberal tradition. Also, Mariano Otero battled unfair harassment from the government. And it went down in history for resisting.

Before that, on June 6, during a tour through Minatitlán, López Obrador expressed, mixing Krauze's name with 19th Century conservative writer, historian and politician, Lucas Alamán:

An organic intellectual, Lucas Krauze Alamán, took sides. Or rather, reaffirmed his conservatism. And so others. How good that they define themselves, no half measures and that each one is located in the right place. It is not the time for simulations: we are either conservatives or liberals.

Hours later, Krauze twitted:

As a historian, I am honored to be compared with Lucas Alamán. But, as a politician, Alamán favored the absolute concentration of power in an illuminated leader, without liberty, and with a strong army. It’s not me, president @lopezobrador_ who resembles conservative Lucas Alamán.

== Awards, recognitions and distinctions ==
- Literature Award Magda Donato for Caudillos culturales en la Revolución mexicana in 1976.
- In 1979 he obtained the Guggenheim Fellowship.
- Member of the Mexican Academy of History since 1989. He occupies the fourth seat.
- In October 1993 he won the IV Comillas Biography Award, annually granted by Tusquets Editores to the best international biography for Siglo de caudillos.
- Medal the Great Cross by the Civil Order of Alfonso X, the Wise, Spain, December 16, 2003.
- He was selected for the Colegio Nacional in Mexico on April 27, 2005.
- In August 2008 he received the Great Cross by the Order of Isabel the Catholic.
- In 2010 he was awarded the National Arts and Science Award in the History, Social Sciences, and Philosophy areas. This award was given by the Mexican government to recognize the best contributions that Mexicans make to the country's cultural and social development.
- In 2012 he received the Great Chapultepec Award, given by the Inter American Press Association, and the International Essay Award Caballero Bonald for his book: Redeemers.
- National Award Juan Pablos for Editorial Merit 2014 for his editorial trajectory and his work in the spread of cultural awareness.
- In December 2015, Mariano Rajoy’s government awards him, through Royal Decree, the Spanish nationality by a naturalization letter.
- On September 13, 2016, in public and solemn session, the H. Guerrero State Congress named him a winner for "Sentimientos de la Nación", the greatest award given by the Legislative power of that state, at the start of the 203rd anniversary of the installation of Chilpancingo's Congress.
- “Mérito Editorial 2016” award given by Guadalajara International Book Fair, November 28.
- “Rosario Castellanos” medal, by Chiapas’ Legislative Power, December 2, 2016.
- Named Doctor "Honoris Causa" by the University of Guadalajara, on November 27, 2017.
- Gold Medal Gabino Barreda by Puebla State’s State Congress, July 5, 2018.
- III Prize of History "Órdenes Españolas", by the Spanish orders of Santiago, Calatrava, Alcántara y Montesa, April 8, 2021.

XXXII Tolerance Award, presented by the Association for Tolerance, Spain, July 2, 2026.

== Other works ==
- 1981. On the book Historia ¿para qué? Arnaldo Córdova, Adolfo Gilly, Enrique Florescano. In Unomásuno.
- 1981. On Gabriel Zaid. Héctor Aguilar Camín. In Sábado y Nexos Magazine.
- 1984. On "Por una democracia sin adjetivos". Rolando Cordera, Manuel Camacho Solís, Carlos Bazdresch, Rafael Segovia, Manuel Aguilar Mora, Eduardo Valle. In Nexos y Vuelta.
- 1988. On "La comedia mexicana de Carlos Fuentes". Several intellectuals. In Unomásuno, La Jornada, Excélsior and other media.
- 1990. On Encuentro Vuelta. Octavio Paz, Mario Vargas Llosa, Gabriel García Márquez, Adolfo Sánchez Vázquez, Carlos Monsiváis, Héctor Aguilar Camín, Rolando Cordera, Arnaldo Córdova, among other. In Vuelta, La Jornada, Proceso, El Financiero.
- 1991. On the Gulf War. Gregorio Selser y Octavio Paz. In La Jornada.
- 1991. On Vuelta and Proceso. Vicente Leñero. In Proceso.
- 1991. On Alberto Ruy Sánchez's departure of Vuelta. In Unomásuno.
- 1992. On the Winter Colloquium. Several media.
- 1992. On the SEP's textbooks. Héctor Aguilar Camín, Enrique Florescano and other intellectuals. In La Jornada, Nexos, Vuelta, El Financiero, Unomásuno, Excélsior, etc.
- 1995. On Carlos Salinas de Gortari. Héctor Aguilar Camín. In Proceso.
- 1996. On the comedy El Coloquio. Víctor Flores Olea, Octavio Paz, Leon Wieseltier. In Proceso.
- 1997. On the book Las grandes mentiras de Krauze, by Manuel López Gallo. Bernardo Bátiz, Humberto Musacchio. In La Jornada, Reforma.
- 1997. On the book La presidencia imperial. Luis González de Alba, Elena Poniatowska. In Nexos and La Jornada.
- 1998. On the Truth commission for the former president Luis Echeverría Álvarez. In Proceso, Reforma.
- 1998. On the book Biography of Power. Claudio Lomnitz. In Milenio.
- 1998-1999. On Vuelta’s legacy and the beginning of Letras Libres. Aurelio Asiain, Christopher Domínguez Michael, Guillermo Sheridan, Alejandro Rossi, Humberto Musacchio, Bela Kuter, Roberto Vallarino. In Proceso, Reforma, La Crónica, El Búho.
- 2001. On Subcommander Marcos. Jaime Martínez Veloz. In La Jornada.
- 2003. On the elections and the vote. Marco Rascón, Javier Sicilia, Fernando del Paso. In Proceso, Reforma, La Jornada, Unomásuno.
- 2004. On the essay "Para salir de Babel". Raúl Trejo Delarbre, Miguel Ángel Granados Chapa, Jorge Medina Viedas, Humberto Musacchio, Ricardo Raphael, Mauricio Merino, Ricardo Alemán. In Letras Libres, Nexos, El Financiero, La Crónica, Reforma, Milenio, El Universal, Excélsior, Proceso.
- 2006. On the essay "El mesías tropical". Víctor Manuel Toledo, José Agustín Pinchetti, Luis Gutiérrez Negrín. In Letras Libres, La Jornada.
- 2007. On Octavio Paz and the left. Arnaldo Córdova, Roger Bartra, Christopher Domínguez Michael, José de la Colina, Jesús Silva-Herzog Márquez. In Reforma, La Jornada, Letras Libres.
- 2008. On tacking the stands. John Ackerman, José Woldenberg, Fernando Pliego. In La Jornada, en Reforma.
- 2008. On democracy and Mexican Revolution. Porfirio Muñoz Ledo. In Reforma.
- 2009-2010. On the article "A la sombra del patriarca". Gerald Martin, Guillermo Sheridan. In Letras Libres.
- 2011. On the academy and the “history of bronze”. Roberto Breña. In Nexos y Letras Libres.
- 2011. On the freedom of speech and journalistic ethics. Several intellectuals from La Jornada mostly. In Letras Libres, Milenio, Reforma and other media.
- 2011. On the Mexican left. Armando Bartra. In Proceso.
- 2013. On oil and Mexican nationalism. John Ackerman. In Proceso.
- 2019. On a family anecdote. Sabina Berman. On Twitter.
