= LGBTQ literature in Mexico =

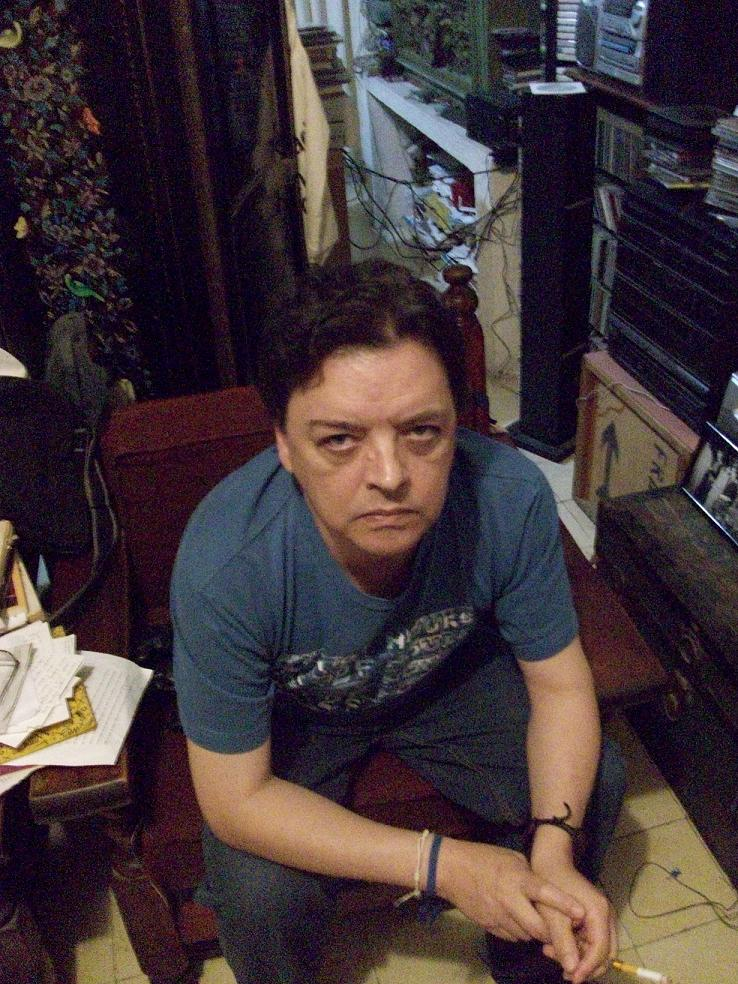
Luis Zapata

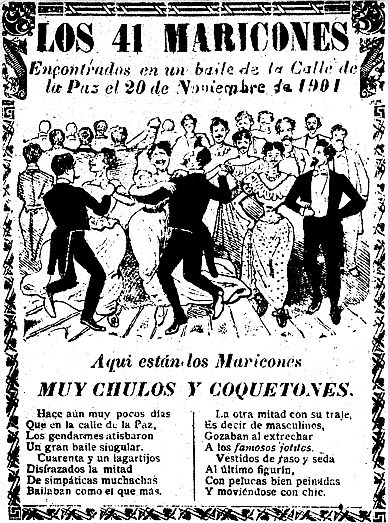
Comic panel by José Guadalupe Posada about the Dance of the 41 scandal that took place in the homophobic novel Los cuarenta y uno (1906) by Eduardo Castrejón.

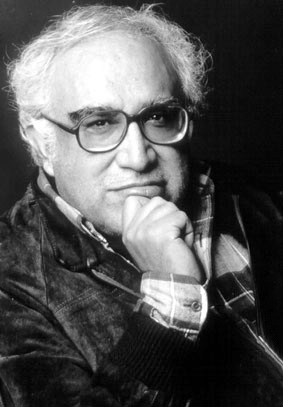
Carlos Monsiváis

LGBT literature in Mexico began to flourish beginning in the 1960s, but came into its own in the 1980s. However, until then, homosexuality had rarely been addressed in literary works, except as something ridiculous, condemnable, or perverted, thanks to the homophobia that dominates Mexican society. In 1975, the activist and theater director Nancy Cárdenas and the writers Carlos Monsiváis and Luis González de Alba published the first manifesto in defense of homosexuals, published in the magazine ¡Siempre! and, in 1979, they organized the first gay pride march. Although some notable novels preceded it (like the 1964 El diario de José Toledo, "The Diary of José Toledo," by Miguel Barbachano Ponce), the novel that marked a true change in direction regarding the scorn and silence around homosexuality was El vampiro de la colonia Roma by Luis Zapata Quiroz, published in 1978. After its publication, many authors had the courage to follow this path and take on the subject of homosexuality without reservations. The 1970s then marked the beginning of a change in perspective in Mexican society with respect to homosexuality thanks to greater recognition and visibility of gay authors.

The unique chronology of the homosexual novel reveals the strong movement of coming out of the closet [...]. It’s evident that the 70s have proven to be a watershed at least in regards to civil life.

— Antonio Marquet

Even so, these works predominantly dealt with masculine homosexuality; female authors and lesbian themes have seen far less representation, despite the notable exceptions of the novels Amora by Rosamaría Roffiel and Infinita ("Infinite") by Ethel Krauze. The debate about the existence of homosexual literature in Mexico has sometimes played out publicly in Mexican media, as happened after the publication of the essay Ojos que da pánico soñar by José Joaquín Blanco in Unomásuno.

== Twentieth Century ==
=== Early Twentieth Century ===
Prior to the 1978 publication of Luis Zapata's El vampiro de la colonia Roma, a number of works that deal with homosexuality stand out, although in some cases due to their openly homophobic positions, like Los cuarenta y uno ("The forty and one") by Eduardo Catrejón, who wanted to praise the proletariat and represent the aristocracy's corruption, alluding to what he considered the most morally repugnant: homosexuality. At the time, homosexuality was considered depraved, with connections to prostitution, and it was severely condemned by the narrator's strict moralism and homophobia. The story fictionalized a famous episode from the Porfiriato period known as the Dance of the Forty-One.

However, McKee Irwin (in Castrejón, 2010), comments that various novels from the 19th century maintain outlines of what homosexuality involves; for example, Castrejón cites the following works:

- El Periquillo Sarniento by José Joaquín Fernández de Lizardi
- Clemencia by Altamirano
- Hermana de los ángeles by Del Castillo
- Los mariditos by Cuéllar
- El fistol del diablo by Payno

These works, upon re-examination, might surprise readers, given that they portray a clear homoeroticism, although the idea of homosexuality itself is far from the temporal mediations of each author.

Salvador Novo's (1904–1974) La estatua de sal ("The Salt Statue") was not published in its entirety until 1998, but its content had appeared in journalistic articles and fragments starting in 1945. Although large parts of his work take on the topic of homosexuality, like his book of poetry, Sátira, el libro ca… ("Satire, the Ca… Book"), which contains "revelations" about many other authors. There are also Novo's essays Las locas, el sexo y los burdeles ("The Crazy Women, the Sex and the Brothels"). Similarly, the Italian Carlo Cóccili (who later lived in Mexico) wrote Fabrizio Lupo 1952, which was translated to Spanish in 1953. Both Novo and Cóccioli were noted homosexual authors. However, these works have distinct intentions: exhibitionism and provocation (in the case of Novo, who intended to scandalize the reader and society), and more critically, with a dramatic and almost tortured background, in the case of Cócciolo. Fabrizio Lupo became the gay Mexican novel par excellence. The novel deals with the relationship between the Catholic Church and homosexuality, topics that other gay novels would tackle later on, like Padre prior ("Father Prior," 1971) by Mauricio González de la Garza.

Salvador Novo's works contain more-or-less veiled allusions to homosexual love. The most explicit is El tercer Fausto, a short theatrical piece in the volume Los diálogos, which contained two other works, originally published in French in 1936. It was another 20 years before the Spanish edition was published. Much subtler in its approach to homosexuality was Xavier Villarrutia in the 1947 Invitación a la muerte ("Invitation to death").

In the first half of the 20th century, there were several gay poets in the group Los Contemporáneos who alluded to the topic of homosexuality in their works. This was the case with Xavier Villarrutia and especially with Salvador Novo. Pellicer is also often mentioned from this group. The most notable poetry is from the book titled, Del amor oscuro ("From Dark Love"), which follows the tradition of Federico García Lorca's Sonetos oscuros ("Dark Sonnets"), by an author identified only as A. R. Miguel Capistrán who compiled many personal texts (like letters) and news articles from the various members of Los Contemporáneos and began publishing them in the 1960s.

The 1950s also saw notable works like the humorous story by Jorge Ferretis, Los machos cabríos (The Macho Goats), published in the book El coronel que asesinó un palomo ("The Colonel who Murdered a Male Pigeon," 1952), and the novella El Norte ("The North") by Emilio Carballido, which tells of the relationship between a young man and an older man in Veracruz. According to Mario Muñoz, this novel was an influence on Fruta verde ("Green Fruit," 2004) by Enrique Serna.

=== 1960s and 1970s: Emergence of the homosexual novel ===
In the 1960s, two novels were published that had little impact but that, for some authors, signaled the true beginning of homosexual Mexican literature. Miguel Barbachano Ponce's El diario de José Toledo ("The Diary of José Toledo," 1964) and Manual Aguilar de la Torre's 41 o el muchacho que soñaba en fantasmas ("41, or the Boy who Dreamed of Ghosts," 1964), which was written under the pseudonym Paolo Po. El diario de José Toledo discusses the suicide of the titular character, a 20-year-old young man feeling spiteful after his lover rejected him, whose story is narrated through the pages of his private diary and comments by an anonymous, third-person omniscient narrator. The novel provides a detailed description of the protagonist's social world (with a powerful description of the everyday homophobia in Mexico). According to Antoine Rodríguez:

[it is] the first novel with a homosexual theme that features a "masculine," which is to say, non-feminized, bureaucrat. The artistic representation of the era’s homosexual that the novel refers to, essentially through cinema, was limited to the figure of the crazy woman, extremely feminized. Our protagonist is closer to the figure of the homophilic "masculine" just as he was disseminated, among others, by the French magazine Arcadie.

In 1962, Juan Vincente Melo published his story Los Amigos ("The Friends"), which was full of subtle homoeroticism. Carlos Fuentes dared to show a homoerotic relationship in his novella A la víbroa de la mar ("To the Sea Viper") 1964.

In 1968, Los Inestables ("The Unstable Ones") was published by the author Alberto X. Teruel, a name which may have been a pseudonym. Schneider (1997) commented on the work, stating:

The work traverses the theme of non-unique love, rather consecutive, chaining together a series of experiences that [...] are assessed through insecurities, instabilities. Teruel seems to establish the thesis that homosexual love is measured by adventure, by frivolities, by an absolute lack of emotional stability.

— Schneider, pp. 74–75

The year 1969 saw the publication of Después de todo ("After Everything") by José Ceballos Maldonado, an author from Uruapan. The novel, told from two locations—the provinces and Mexico City—is the story of a man who defines his essence based on criticism and established double standards, who only follows orders. However, the protagonist, Javier Lavalle, makes his own way and affirms that the only important thing is learning to be proud of who you are.

Carlos Monsiváis was one of the most well-known and most committed gay writers. He took great interest in studying and disseminating the work and life of Los Contemporáneos, a group of Mexican modernists and a magazine of the same name, so he told the story of male chauvinist persecution and homophobia that they suffered at the hands of the Stridentists and the muralists in the book Amor perdido ("Lost Love," 1977). He also wrote a work about one of the most well-known of the Stidentists, Salvador Novo: Salvador Novo, lo marginal en el centro ("Salvador Novo, Centering the Marginalized"). Another of Monsiváis' important works in denouncing chauvinism in Mexican society was Escenas de pudor y liviandad ("Scenes of Shyness and Frivolity," 1988). Heriberto Yépez synthesized Monsiváis’ contribution towards gay visibility in Mexico, stating:

The general inheritance that Monsiváis passes on to us is a magnificent gay diction: the proper nouns like Patafísica de las Costumbres; the use of garlic for relaxation; the spelling like choreography; the grammar like an anagram; the style like a parade of fashion, moods, media, fears, verbal mutes; the moral demons converted into gestures; the good behavior of the social-Me disrupted by the promiscuous interruption of voices speaking all in one inter-text; the mockery of idiomatic conventions and the feast of ostentatious intertextual appropriations, in sum, the exhibitionistm of difference displayed for a strict comedic actor and artificial irritation (circus, somersault, theater) that extra-demonstrates its ideological defiance and linguistic spectacle against High Society and the Enormous Norms. Every time that Monsiváis writes, the Spanish language comes out of the closet.

— Heriberto Yépez, "Algunas reflexiones a partir de poesía gay," in Alforja. Revista de poesía, no. xx, spring 2002.

Monstaváis was later honored with gesture of recognition for gay visibility when the LGBT flag was placed over his coffin in the Palacio de Bellas Artes in Mexico in 2010.

Jorge Arturo Ojeda wrote various novels on this subject of homosexuality including Muchacho solo ("Lonely Boy," 1976; 1987) and Octavio (1982). One novel that some consider a seminal work is El diario de José Toledo ("The Diary of José Toledo") by Miguel Barbachano Ponce, published in 1964. For some historians, this novel marked the true birth of the Mexican homosexual novel. Others point to the 1978 publication of El vampiro de la colonia Roma by Luis Zapata Quiroz as the start of queer literature in Mexico. El vampiro de la colonia Roma was supposed to be quite an event and, in the words of the academic León Guillermo Gutiérrez, it shed light on:

The hypocrisy of Mexican society, in which a lot of effort had been taken to hide in the corner of the closet: the practical, everyday life of homosexuality in all social spheres. Zapata does not conform with coming out of the closet, he takes it and travels by foot, car, bus, or motorcycle through the streets, avenues, parks, restaurants, and movie theaters of the big city and other latitudes of the country’s geography.

In the 1970s, three important stories with homosexual themes appeared: Mapache ("Raccoon," 1975) by Jorge Arturo Ojeda, Los zapatos de la princesa ("The Princess’s Shoes," 1978) by Guillermo Samperio and Siete veces el sueño ("Seven Times the Dream," 1979) by Luis Arturo Ramos. Additionally, the first fully gay work of theater in Mexico debuted in 1974, thanks to the work of Nancy Cárdenas. However, this was not a work written by a Mexican author, but was an adaptation of The Boys in the Band by Mart Crowley.

=== 1980s and 1990s: LGBT literature flourishes ===
Gay literature flourished in the 1980s, in large measure because AIDS made homosexuality visible during this period, and institutions had to run campaigns directed at this community, thus provoking interest in modes of communication that informed about the community's customs, needs, and characteristics and, in any case, began to uncover old topics and open new perspectives. This included ending the use of traditional derogatory terms (like joto, marica, loca) and starting to popularize the neutral term gay. This decade also saw increased circulation of works in Spanish by gay authors (with the tactics of the so-called Latin American Boom), like the Argentine Manuel Puig, the Colombian Gustavo Álvarez Gardeazábal, the Chilean José Donoso, or the Cuban Reinaldo Arenas.

Among later authors, critics have highlighted Las púberes canéforas ("The Pubescent Kanephoros") by José Joaquín Blanco, published in 1983, for its quality. In the same decade, other noted works from Luis Zapata came out (Melodrama in 1989, En jirones in 1985, and La hermana secreta de Angélica María in 1989). Other novels from Mexican authors in this period include Octavio (1982) by Jorge Arturo Ojeda, Sobre esta piedra ("About this Stone," 1982) by Eduardo Turón, and Utopía Gay ("Gay Utopia," 1983) by José Rafael Calva.

Utopía gay is a humorous work, structured in long interior monologues that describe the relationship between male lovers, Carlos and Adrián, the latter of which becomes pregnant. This is an activist novel, pushing for the acceptance of homosexuality and the renunciation of the heteronormative mentality and the homophobia then present in society. It also reclaims a model of homosexuality that is cut off from femininity or promiscuity, showing a stable, committed, lasting relationship, in which pregnancy does not signify feminization. However, this rejection of the feminine causes some parts of the text to come off misogynistically.

Juan Carlos Bautista is a multifaceted author, with audiovisual and narrative works, but who is most of all known for his poetry collections Lenguas en erección (1992, reprinted in 2007), Cantar del Marrakech ("To Sing of Marrakesh," 1993, 2004) and Bestial ("Bestial," 2003).

José Dimayuga won multiple prizes for his theatrical work Afectuosamente, su comadre ("Affectionately, Your Godmother," 1992), a comedy about a young transvestite and a school teacher. Homosexuality is a recurring theme in his work, although according to the author, he looks for universal themes, as in the case of his work La forma exacta de percibir las cosas ("The Exact Way to Notice Things"), which is about the breakup of a gay couple that could have just as easily been heterosexual.

In 1996, the first anthology of gay Mexican stories was published: De amores marginales, edited by Mario Muñoz. This anthology collected 16 stories by authors from various eras and was the first large-scale perspective that offered the possibility of familiarizing oneself with the country's homosexual literature. Among other stories, it included:

- "Sólo era un juego" by Víctor Rejón
- "Callejón" by Héctor Domínguez Rubalcava
- "Opus 123" by Inés Arredondo
- "También hay inviernos fértiles" by Severino Salazar
- "El alimento del artista" by Enrique Serna
- "De amor es mi negra pena" by Luis Zapata
- "El vino de los bravos" by Luis González de Alba

Joaquín Hurtado Pérez is an author of straight literature with a taste for sordid environments. Some of his notable works are Laredo Song (1997), a book set in the environment around Monterrey and La dama sonámbula, which won the Nuevo León Prize in Literature in 2006.

== 21st century ==
In the early 21st century, authors continued compiling anthologies and references about Mexico's LGBT literature. In 2001, Víctor Manuel Mendiola selected and wrote the prologue for Sol de mi antojo, antología poética de erotismo gay, a reference work about homosexual poetry in Mexico. A publication that shed light on distinct pieces of theater with homosexual themes was the anthology compiled by Tomás Urtusástegui El teatro homosexual en México ("Homomsexual Theater in Mexico," 2002). It comprised seven different texts abounding with marginalized homosexual characters.

In 2002, Fernando Zamora published Por debajo del agua (Plaza & Janés, 2002), a work that parodies novels about the Mexican Revolution. The story centers on transvestism and homosexuality, providing an ironic portrayal of the stereotypical macho revolutionary. The novel tells the story of friendship and clandestine love between Pablo Aguirre, revolutionary general in Álvaro Obregón's army, and Hugo Estrada, and a relationship ultimately destroyed because of internalized homophobia. The literary critic Braulio Peralta considered Por debajo del agua a milestone in the history of the Mexican gay rights movement for unmasking both Mexican stereotypes and internalized homophobia. For the American researcher Dieter Ingenschay, Por debajo del agua demonstrates, "the permanent relevance of a subject (gay subculture) that remains, in many senses, unexplored in the region."

In 2004, Fernando Zamora returned with the novel Triángulo de amor y muerte ("Love and Death Triangle," 2004) in which he parodied another literary genre (in this case, noir to ridicule the cliché of the macho Mexican). This novel tells, through various points of view, the murder of a piano teacher and his relationship with his dear student Cristóbal and his relationship with a woman.

In 2007, gay Yucatecan writer Will Rodríguez published Pulpo en su tinta y otras formas de morir ("Octopus in its Ink and Other Ways to Die"). It is about a book of short stories where death is very present alongside the homosexual experience. According to the author, "Gay themes are something that we cannot do without because they are in front of everyone, it’s something as natural as birth, life, or death. Sexuality is part of our everyday life."

In 2009, Raúl Rodríguez Cetina published El pasado me condena ("The Past Condemns Me"), an autobiographical work in which he describes the formation of Mexico's gay community through his own viewpoint and experiences, which he had already used in decades earlier in his novel El desconocido ("The Stranger," 1977), the first Mexican novel to take on the subject of male prostitution.

Tryno Maldonado published Temporada de caza para el león negro ("Black Lion Hunting Season," Anagrama, 2009), a novel about a successful painter, Golo, told by his lover. This work became a semi-finalist for the XXVI Premio Herralde. The critic Miguel García-Posada pointed to Maldonado as a literary representative of postmodernism and highlighted that, in his opinion, the novel's poor writing style and transgressive contents mark the novel as an example of the postmodernist movement's Weak thought (Spanish: Pensamiento débil).

In 2007, the publishing house Fondo Editorial Tierra Adentro published Sus brazos labios en mi boca rodando by Sergio Loo, a highly homoerotic poetry collection that was also printed as a special edition by Spanish publisher Foc. Although better known as a poet, Sergio Loo published his first novel, House: retratos desmontables ("House: Detachable Portraits") in 2011, composed of microchapters ordered to evoke the rhythm of house music and with chapters that demonstrate an Almodovorian inspiration, in which sex and marginalization abound. According to Fidel Reyes Rodríguez, the novel:

... is the chronic pain and sentimentality of a generation, of an era; it's a song to friendship and disloyalty; it's a cry of horror before the fleetingness of things, of life. And it is, additionally, a self-portrait of marginalized beings who find a refuge for their differences in other marginalized beings. (Drug addicts, homosexuals, dark identities, drug traffickers…)

The philologist Antiono Alatorre died in 2010. Among his posthumous papers was a novel he had spent many years working on, titled La migraña ("The Migraine"), which was published (with the consent of the children from his first marriage) in 2012. The novel, which is semi-autobiographical, is set in a seminary. It is a coming-of-age novel that relates the loss of innocence of the main character, who is in a religious institution and suffering from a crisis of absolute faith and becoming aware of his own body. Although this novel does not deal explicitly with sexuality (or homosexuality), academics have highlighted its clear and implicit presence. As the academic David Huerta explains:

I do not believe it is an exaggeration to say that this novel is a partial illustration of the old theme of the "ages of man." Here, two of these ages are being addressed: adolescence or the end of childhood and the first youth; [...] The birth of a young man thanks to La Migraña's brilliant attack means that, in these pages, there is also the birth of an atheist: the fledgling Catholic priest in the Tlalpan seminary transforms into an absolute unbeliever [...]. The other theme is the birth of a different body for the same individual, a common experience for those who are growing up, and furthermore, who have awareness of this transformation; no just the body of a young man in contrast with the adolescent body, rather more specifically the body of a homosexual; again: this birth is not explicit in Alatorre's novel, but this theme is filigreed across its pages for anyone who desires to see it. The scenes in the seminary bathroom, in the last part of the book, are transparent enough, it seems to me, to arrive at this interpretation.

— David Huerta, Revista de la Universidad de México

In 2013, Sergio Téllez-Pon published the poetry collection No recuerdo el amor sino el deseo. The author has also excelled as an essayist with Antología de la poesía homoerótica ("Anthology of Homoerotic Poetry," 2006).

In 2014, the journalist Guillermo Osorno published Tengo que morir todas las noches ("I Have to Die Every Night"), set in the 1980s and centered on the Gay bar El Nueve, located on London Street in Zona Rosa, Mexico City, one of the pillars of Mexican counterculture in this era.

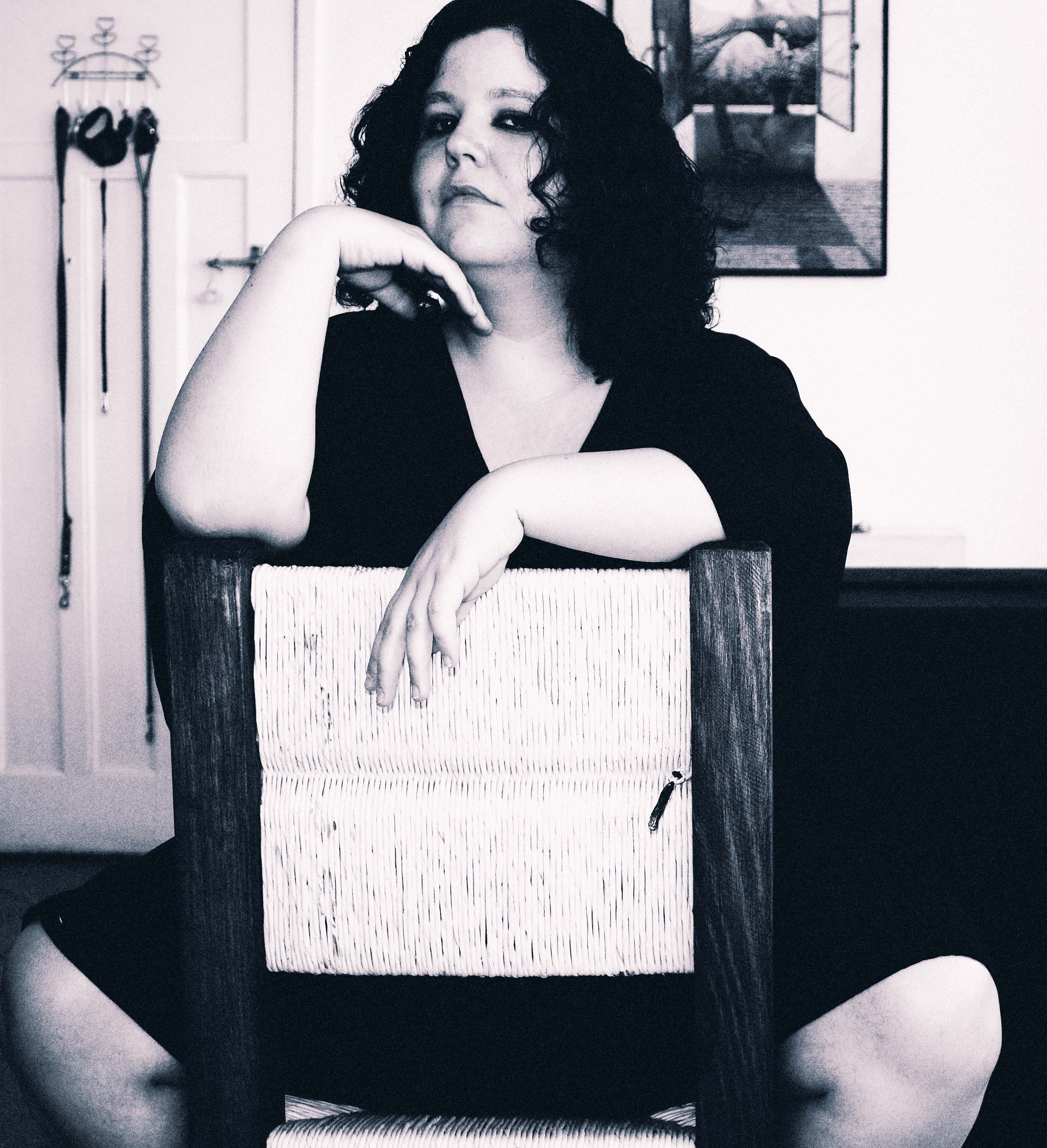
Artemisa Téllez en 2012.

In lesbian literature, one of the genre's most important contemporary figures is Artemisa Téllez. The publication of her novel Crema de vainilla ("Vanilla Cream," 2014), in particular, is considered a key moment in Mexican lesbian literature, although the story, which follows the relationship between two women and shows their violent sexual practices, also caused a controversy. Another of Téllez's narrative works featuring lesbian content is the short story collection, Fotografías instantáneas ("Instant photographs"), published in 2016. She has also published poetry collections with erotic lesbian themes like Cuerpo de mi soledad ("Body of my Solitude," 2010), Cangrejo ("Crab," 2017) and Mujeres de Cromagnon ("Cromagnon Women," 2020).

Another author from the 2010s who has portrayed the gay Mexican underworld is Wenceslao Bruciaga, particularly with his novel Funerales de hombres raros ("Funerals for Strange Men"), in which a member of a group of gay friends commits suicide. Bruciaga has also explored aspects of contemporary homosexual life in Bareback Jukebox (2017) and Pornografía para piromaniácos ("Pornography for Pyromaniacs," 2022).

In the 21st century, commercial works and comedies have begun to represent homosexuality more naturally. One of the most successful works of theater was Baño turco ("Turkish Bath") by Jorge Sánchez de Tagle, about gay characters who run into each other in the sauna.

== Specialized publishers ==
The growing market for homosexual literature fostered in the 21st century is spread out across diverse books by authors and foreign publishers in Spanish. In 2008, the Spanish publisher Egales, created by Mili Hernández and Mar de Griñó, introduced its catalog at the National Autonomous University of Mexico's Feria del Palacio de Minería and began distributing key authors in Spanish queer literature in Mexico, such as Alberto Mira, Luis Antonio de Villena, Eduardo Mendicutti, and Isabel Franc. Works from other Spanish-speaking countries are also distributed, like those of Cuban author Carmen Duarte or Argentine author Luis Corbacho.

The Spanish imprint Odisea has also started distributing its books in Mexico, especially the winners of the Odisea Prize for new storytellers, like Cruzando el límite ("Crossing the Limit") by Hecheres Beltrán and El diario de JL by Álex Rei.

Works by gay authors are also in wide circulation in Mexico, like the Peruvian Jaime Bayly (No se lo digas a nadie) or the Columbian Fernando Vallejo (La virgen de los sicarios and El Desbarrancadero). Publication of gay literature has increased in literary magazines, like essays by the Spanish author Oscar Esquivias in Tropo a la uña (2002).

In 2007, the first Mexican publisher dedicated to gay literature was established. It was called Quimera Ediciones and its catalog introduced emblematic works like La historia de siempre by Luis Zapata and No recuerdo el amor sino el deseo by Sergio Téllez Pon. Both authors are Mexican (as are others in Quimera's catalog, like Juan Carlos Bautista or Ricardo Nicolayevsky), but the publisher also edited and distributed foreign authors in Spanish (like the Cuban author Odette Alonso or the Peruvian Jorge Eduardo Eielson) and classics (Oscar Wilde), in agreement with its editorial policy, which was to:

Publish literary-quality queer texts, not only with sex-related themes, but that are also interested in the queer literary linguistic aspects of literature in today's Spanish.

In 2012, the publisher Mafia Rosa was launched by Jaun Carlos Bautista, Hernán Bravo Varela, and Víctor Jaramillo. Its aim was to publish Latin American authors of gay literature in any genre. Its first titles were works by Uruguayans Alfredo Fressia and William Johnston and planned to publish Mexican authors like Sergio Loo and Juan Carlos Bautista.

Ricardo Velmore and Dino Vanko created Anal Magazine, a magazine dedicated to all the cultural aspects of masculine homosexuality, with a focus on photography, design, literature, art, and fashion, with carefully curated issues and bilingual (English and Spanish) texts.

== Academic discussion ==
In November 2010, the National Autonomous University of Mexico organized the First International Colloquium on Sapphic Writings (Primer Coloquio Internacional de Escrituras Sáficas), coordinated by María Elena Olivera, Elena Madrigal, and Bertha de la Maza. In 2013, they held the Second International Colloquium on Sapphic Writings, this time coordinated by Elena Madrigal, Bertha de la Maza, and Leticia Romero, under the auspices of the Metropolitan Autonomous University–Azcapotzalco, the Autonomous University of Mexico City–Cuautepec, and the Cultural Voices in Ink Forum.

== See also ==
- Mexican literature
- LGBTQ culture in Mexico
- LGBTQ literature in Argentina
- LGBTQ literature in Brazil
- LGBTQ literature in Colombia
- LGBTQ literature in Costa Rica
- LGBTQ literature in Ecuador
- LGBTQ literature in El Salvador
- LGBTQ literature in Guatemala
- LGBTQ literature in Spain
- LGBTQ literature in Venezuela

== Bibliography ==
- Oscar Eduardo Rodríguez (2006), El personaje gay en la obra de Luis Zapata, Publishers.
- Luis Ulloa (2007), El tema homosexual en la narrativa mexicana del siglo XX[4], [report]. Leída en el Coloquio de Cultura Mexicana (Universidad de Guadalajara/Uppsala Universitet).
- Antonio Marquet, Castrejón, Cóccioli y Novo: la novela gay en la primera mitad del siglo XX, Universidad Autónoma Metropolitana-Azcapotzalco [5]
- León Guillermo Gutiérrez, La ciudad y el cuerpo en la novela mexicana de temática homosexual, Universidad Autónoma del Estado de Morelos.[6]
- León Guillermo Gutiérrez, Sesenta años del cuento mexicano de temática gay. Anales de Literatura Hispanoamericana, vol. 41, pp. 277–296.
- Rafael Hernández Rodríguez (2005), Notas para una generación perdida: literatura mexicana de finales del siglo XX, Revista Agulha, nº 44. [7]
- Elena Poniatowska (2011), "México se escribe con J, una historia de la cultura gay," La Jornada, Sunday, 9-XII-2011. [8]
- Claudia Patricia Giraldo A. (2009) "Qué es la literatura queer: las compilaciones de literatura queer, gay y lésbica." Universidad Santo Tomás (Colombia) [9]. Ponencia en el VII Congreso Internacional Orbis Tertius de Teoría y Crítica Literaria "ESTADOS DE LA CUESTIÓN" Actualidad de los estudios de teoría, crítica e historia literaria, May 18, 19, and 20, 2009.
- Mario Alberto Reyes, Temática gay en la literatura mexicana, de nivel inferior pero con momentos históricos vibrantes, Noticiese.org, 10-XII-2007. [10]
- Mario Muñoz, "La literatura mexicana de transgresión sexual," Amerika [online], 4 | 2011, published June 21, 2011, retrieved March 18, 2013.
- Juan Carlos Rocha Osornio, "La creación de la comunidad gay en la escritura de Raúl Rodríguez Cetina," Hipertexto, n.º 17, winter 2013, pp. 32–45.
- Juan Carlos Rocha Osornio. "El performance del insulto en los albores de la novela mexicana de temática homosexual: 41 o el muchacho que soñaba en fantasmas de Paolo Po Archivado December 23, 2015 en Wayback Machine.". CRR: Cincinnati Romance Review, n.º 34 (2012): 97–111.
- Braulio Peralta, Los nombres del arco iris: trazos para redescubrir el movimiento homosexual. Nueva Imagen, 2006.
- Elina Hernández Carballido; Diccionario de escritores mexicanos; Universidad Nacional Autónoma de México, Instituto de Investigaciones Filológicas, 2007.
- Sergio Téllez-Pon, Sergio: "Por una literatura queer," Revista Luvina, no. 60, fall 2010.
- "Diez autores gay," Revista Marvin, n.º 113. México: July–August, 2013; pp. 66–67.
- Diccionario de literatura mexicana: siglo XX. Volumen 19 of Filosofía y cultura contemporánea. Armando Pereira (coordinador). Contributors: Claudia Albarrán, Juan Antonio Rosado, Angélica Tornero. UNAM, 2004
- María Elena Olivera, Entre amoras. Narrativa lésbica mexicana, UNAM-CEIICH, 2009. http://computo.ceiich.unam.mx/webceiich/docs/libro/Entre%20amoras%20web.pdf Archived February 21, 2022 via Wayback Machine.
- Miguel Ángel Teposteco: "Paolo Po: la historia oculta tras el autor de la primera novela gay en México," Confabulario, December 19, 2015.
- Elena Madrigal y Leticia Romero, Un juego que cabe entre nosotras. Acercamientos a la crítica y a la creación de la literatura sálica. Con un comunicado y textos de Cristina Peri-Rossi. México: Voces en Tinta, 2014. ISBN 978-607-9324-03-2
