= Los días y los años =

Mexican novel chronicling the 1968 student movement

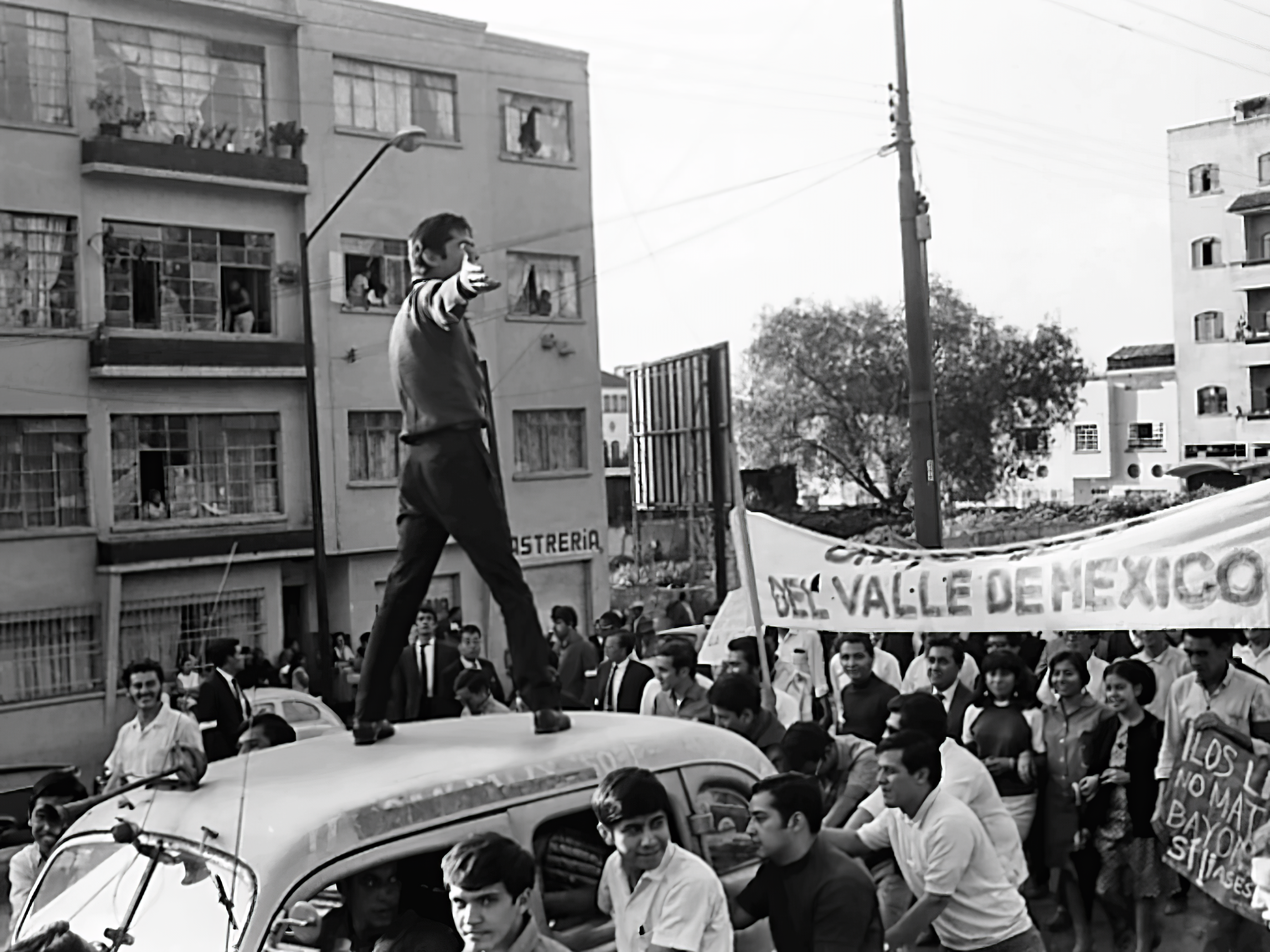
- Photo by Pedro Meyer on which the cover of the first edition of Los días y los años was based
- Author: Luis González de Alba
- Language: Spanish
- Subject: Mexican Movement of 1968, Corruption in Mexico, Tlatelolco massacre, State terrorism, Palacio de Lecumberri
- Genre: Novel
- Publisher: Ediciones Era
- Publication date: November 15, 1971
- Publication place: Mexico
- Followed by: Y sigo siendo sola (1979)

Los días y los años (English: The Days and the Years) is a political novel and narrative account by Mexican author Luis González de Alba.

== Themes ==
The novel describes the events surrounding the 1968 Mexican Student Movement from the author's point of view, including two of the incidents that preceded the massacre:

1. The formation of the National Strike Council, the protests, and the rallies.
2. The events leading to the Tlatelolco massacre, specifically the jailing of students, leaders, and professors in the Palacio de Lecumberri.

The first edition, published in 1971 and limited to just 2,000 copies, had the following description on the back cover:

This book is a testimony as well as a reflection. The conflict between students and the state, such as the one that arose in Mexico in 1968, is depicted here from the perspective of one of its participants, a student from the College of Philosophy and Letters and member of the National Strike Council, who, in order to analyze the events, does not abide by just his vision and demands, though the dialogue, his classmates' vision. We see how the Student Movement's moral, ideological, and political choices grow like waves that start from a single point and grow larger, from the individual to the collective, from the specific to the general. The author moves freely, dialectically, through the time that his story spans, confronting moments of the past and the present.

Thus, we discover in a realistic, objective, and, at the same time, intimate way, the reasons and questions from a young conscience that decided to take action, leave behind an individualistic outlook and embrace a collective one. Without a doubt, this is the first literary work born of the Student Movement, facing the crystallization of a conscience nourished on its own commitment: before the interior wound heals, it is necessary to come to terms with it. Thus, on mediating on itself, on meditating on its collision with reality, a generation prepares itself for imminent maturity.

== Context ==
González de Alba wrote the novel during the two years that he spent imprisoned in the Palacio de Lecumberri. Some of the central themes that surround the process of writing this novel include fights, marches, rallies, skirmishes, pursuits, defamation, corruption, state-sponsored terrorism, imprisonment, and lawsuits against political leaders.

== Plot ==
A 24-year-old man, Luis González de Alba, representative of the College of Philosophy and Letters before the National Strike Council as a member of the Committee of Philosophy and Letters, recreates life in the Black Palace of Lecumberri for the 1968 Student Movement's political prisoners. González de Alba narrates from his own experiences, reporting on events occurring in the context of Mexico's 1968 Student Movement. The National Strike Council convenes the entire student community in Mexico so that the government can fulfill the demands of the movement's petitionary suit, which included:

1. Freeing political prisoners.
2. Dismissing Generals Luis Cueto Ramírez and Raúl Mendiola, and Coronel Armando Frías.
3. Disbanding the grenadier corp, a direct instrument of repression, and prohibiting the creation of similar corps.
4. Repealing Article 145 and 145 B of the Federal Penal Code (which establishes the crime of social dissolution), a method used for judicial aggression.
5. Providing compensation from that point on to the families of the dead and injured who were victims of the Friday, July 26 attack.
6. Defining responsibility for the acts of repression and vandalism committed by the authorities through the police, grenadier, and the army.

Gustavo Díaz Ordaz, Mexico's president in 1968, decides to ignore the National Strike Council's petitions despite the myriad persons who have joined the cause, from politicians and celebrities to artists and writers, like Juan Rulfo and Juan José Arreola. Instead of responding to the requests for petitionary suit, and given the approach of the 1968 Summer Olympics that were held in Mexico, Díaz Ordaz decides to respond with violence, repression, and infringing on the autonomy of the National Autonomous University of Mexico. These events set off a series of tragedies, which the author narrates, in search of freedom in a country with a great lack of it.

== Contents ==
The novel consists of three parts, with two interwoven accounts. The first account narrates the events that occurred in the 1968 Student Movement and prior to the Tlatelolco massacre, seen from González de Alba's perspective and experience. The second account is a meta-narration by González de Alba in Lecumberri prison after the Tlatelolco massacre, during which he was arrested, that narrates González de Alba's experiences with his fellow inmates while he writes this very book, Los días y los años.

=== Chapters ===
I. The tragedies of the riots between prisoners and guards inside Lecumberri prison following González de Alba's arrest.

II. This chapter contains an interwoven account. It begins in Lecumberri, discussing shared opinions about ideals in the student movement's struggle, such as the differences of opinion surrounding the National Strike Council. The chapter then jumps to recollections of how the National Strike Council began: disputes between the Instituto Politécnico Nacional's vocational schools and immediate and subsequent altercations between students and grenadier, including the military's occupation of the schools.

III. Chats in the prison and recollections of the subsequent assemblies during the vocational schools' occupation.

IV. Planning the August 1, 1968 protests, the difficulties of obtaining a permit for the protest, and the irregularities in Dean Javier Barros Sierra heading the march.

V. The August 1, August 5, and August 13, 1968, protests; the national strike held throughout the country's universities; the rally for the six-point petitionary suit on behalf of the universities and the National Strike Council.

VI. National Strike council meeting after the August 13, 1968 march and discussions in the halls of Lecumberri about going on strike to demand freedom.

VII. Anecdotes, hallway conversations, sorrows, and nostalgia that González de Alba relates from inside Lecumberri. The chapter jumps to recollections of the events of the August 13, 1968 protest, continuing through planning and carrying out the August 27, 1968 protest. This chapter also deals with the National Strike Council's petition to the government to enter public talks.

VIII. Narrative account of the events that occurred during the August 27, 1968 protest.

IX. Problems with the government discrediting the National Strike Council's cause since the protests and repression following August 27, 1968; the government's noncompliance with the requests of the petitionary suit; planning a silent vigil for September 1, 1968; relating events during the August 1, 1968 march; September 15, 1968 festivities for Mexican Independence Day.

X. Military occupation of the university town on September 18, 1968, and the subsequent protests; the problems of reuniting the National Strike Council in the face of the September 18 arrests; the resignation of Rector Javier Barros Sierra from UNAM and the student movement's campaign against this injustice and his tragic resignation.

XI. The military capture of Casco de Santo Tomás (an area where one of the Instituto Politécnico Nacional campuses is located in Mexico City) and the resulting disorganization; rallies in support of Barros Sierra; attacks by the Federación Nacional de Estudiantes Técnicos (National Federation of Technical Students) armed with automatic weapons on the gates and guards of educational institutions tied to the student movement; reorganization of the National Strike Council in response to the assault on Casco de Santo Tomás; use of the student movement as a political weapon in the battle between presidential candidates; rejection of the resignation of Barros Sierra and his return to the position of rector; an end to the occupation of Ciudad Universitaria, Mexico City on the request of Barros Sierra on September 30, 1968.

== Controversy ==
=== González de Alba–Elena Poniatowska feud ===
Twenty-five years after the publication of Elena Poniatowska's La noche de Tlatelolco: Testimonios de historia oral (English: The Night of Tlatelolco: An Oral History), González de Alba decided to sue Poniatowska for having misrepresented the quotations she used in her book that originated in Los días y los años. González de Alba won the suit and forced Poniatowska to edit and reprint her book. According to González de Alba, the quotations that Poniatowska related in her book were distorted and incomplete. González de Alba denied that the suit was a matter of plagiarism, admitting that he himself sent Poniatowska accounts of his experiences before the book was published. What bothered González de Alba was that, according to him, Poniatowska had not been completely unbiased in her treatment of the accounts he provided to her.

=== González de Alba's suicide ===
González de Alba wrote a letter to Rafael Pérez Gay ceding the copyright for Los días y los años to the publisher Cal y Arena before committing suicide. This, together with the date on which González de Alba decided to kill himself, and his advanced chronic vertigo, suggests that González de Alba had been planning his suicide for months, possibly years. This theory is supported by an interview by Héctor Aguilar Camín, writer and friend of González de Alba.

== See also ==
- Luis González de Alba
- Mexican Movement of 1968
- Tlatelolco massacre
- LGBT literature in Mexico
