= Álvaro Cueva =

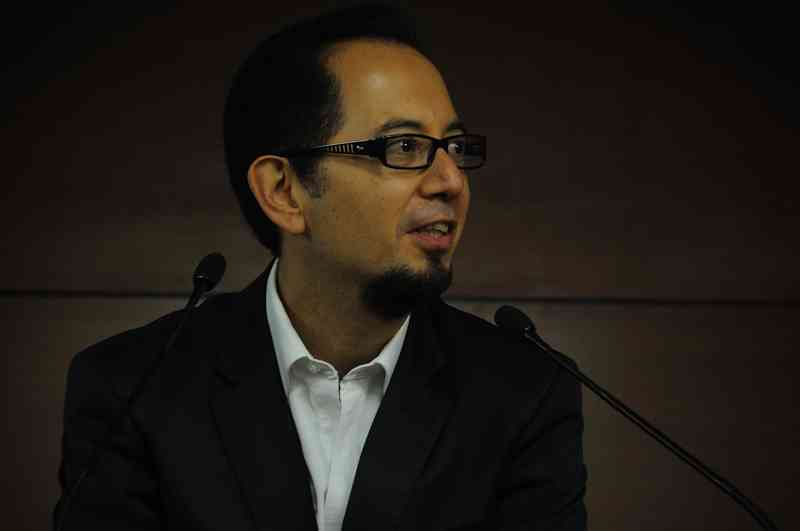
Cueva speaking at a journalism event at the Monterrey Institute of Technology and Higher Education, Mexico City

Álvaro Cueva (born January 29, 1968) is a Mexican television critic and journalist who works in print, television and radio. When he began his career in the 1980s, Mexican newspapers were not interested in columns about television and he began writing about cinema. However, he eventually convinced newspapers to let him write about television, at first under a pseudonym. He briefly left writing when offered a co anchor position on the television show Ventaneando in 1997; however, he did not like the gossip aspect of the show and in the same year left, broke and in poor health. He returned to writing as a freelancer, writing columns and books which eventually led to steady work with the Milenio newspaper, which he still writes a daily column for. Professionally he has written over 3,000 articles in over thirty newspapers and magazines and still appears on television and does regular appearances on radio shows.

== Life ==
Álvaro Cueva was born in Monterrey, Mexico on January 29, 1968. He grew up with a brother and sister but spent much time alone as a child because both parents had to work. He says he has loved television since he was a baby. He grew up with it, including watching telenovelas which are not made for children. When asked what he wanted to be when he grew up his answer was "to make television."

He received a scholarship to attend the Monterrey Institute of Technology and Higher Education in Monterrey, from 1984 to 1988, graduating with a degree in communications. He studied under teachers such as José Antonio Alcaraz, Emmanuel Carballo, Héctor Anaya, Jesús González Dávila, Ethel Krauze, Luis Reyes de la Maza, José María Fernández Unsaín, Gerardo de la Torre, Silvia Molina and Arrigo Cohen. He also took courses and seminars with the Colegio de la Frontera Norte from 1990 to 1991 and with the Sociedad General de Escritores de México from 1991 to 1993.

Since graduation he has had a career in both print and broadcast, mostly in Mexico City.

Cueva is openly gay.

== Career ==
=== Critic ===
Cueva's principal role is that of a television critic, and he has no desire to be anything else despite offers for positions in administration of major communications companies. In 2004, Mexican magazine Revista Pantalla.com described him as "the best television critic in Mexico" and credited his opinion with the weight to effect changes to Mexican television. His work has been characterized as direct, without limits in what he will say and about what programs. He believes television to be a fundamental part of popular culture and a reflection of what is happening in society.

He has no preference between broadcast and cable television and says that he "experiences television from all sides." He has an "army" of recorders for shows so he can watch and critique them. However, he believes that television in Mexico is in decline, blaming much of this on the commercialism of the two main networks in Mexico, Televisa and TV Azteca, who he says impede the making of quality television in favor of making money. He hopes that one day, television production will be valued and preserved much like cinema production is.

=== Publications ===
Cueva's work began appearing in university publications as early as 1982. However at this time, most newspapers did not want critiques of television so he had to write about movies. This eventually changed and while he principally writes about television, he also writes about media and show business as well as political and social analysis. He has written over 3,000 articles in over thirty publications professionally since 1987. Although he works in both print and broadcast media, he prefers to write over appear on television.

After some persuasion, Cueva eventually convinced the El Norte and Reforma newspapers to let him write about television in a column called Lágrimas de cocodrilo (Crocodile Tears) and later with Corre videotape (Run videotape). However, he was required to publish under the pseudonym "TV Adicto" (TV Addict). This continued until 1997, when he left to work on the television show Ventaneando on TV Azteca. However, Reforma continued to publish the columns with the same pseudonym but with a different writer.

The stint at TV Azteca did not last long and in the same year Cueva quit in poor physical and financial health. Unable to get full-time work, he used his entrepreneurship training from his college days to begin writing freelance. He would sell his columns to whoever would buy them and eventually he began to have regular success with the Diario de Monterrey, (later becoming Milenio) with his columns appearing in Monterrey and Mexico City, which allowed him to publish under his own name. He continues as a journalist with Milenio with a daily column. but his work also appears in other newspaper under columns with names such as El Pozo de los Deseos Reprimidos, Ojo por Ojo, Columna Higene Mental, Archivo Cueva, El mundo de Alvaro Cueva and more. He also publishes regularly in magazines including Telemundo, Business Style and Onexpo.

Since the late 1990s, he has published a number of books. His first book was Lágrimas de cocodrilo, historia minima de las telenovelas en México published in 1998. This book won a Galardón de Honor in 1999. His next book was Sangre de mi Sangre, verdades de las telenovelas en América Latina, published in 2001 about the phenomenon of telenovelas in Latin America. In 2005, Alvaro Cueva presenta Telenovelas de México was published, the first dictionary dedicated to the subject. It covers over 872 telenovelas and contains over 500 photographs. It was published as a series of magazines rather than in book format. This was followed by 50 años de Gloria about the history of television in Nuevo León and the rest of Mexico which was published in 2009. In addition, Cuevas has collaborated with three other books with other authors: El gran libro de las telenovelas, Crónicas de Pasión and La indiscreta, 10 años de Ventaneando.

Although his writing is mostly critique, he has written some creative works for television and film. These include scripts for television specials such as Momentos para no olvidar for the 55th anniversary of Mexican television in 2005 as well as two related to telenovelas in 1998 and 1999 as well as some of the scripts for Ventaneando when he was with them in 1997. He wrote the script for one telenovela called Rivales por accidente for TV Azteca in 1997, as well as scripts for radio shows such as Páginas de la vidas for Radio Educación in 1996. In addition, he wrote three movie scripts: Mishi, el ocaso de la esperanza in 1992, Vamos a danzar a documentary about pre Hispanic dance and Luz a ratos a short film in 1996.

=== Television and radio ===
His first experience working on television was becoming a co host on an entertainment show called Ventaneando in 1997. Although this allowed him to use his real name for the first time related to his critiques of television, his main role was that of an anchor mostly devoted to gossip, which he did not like. The stress of the experience affected his health and while the stint paid well, he spent most of it on doctors and medication. In the same year, he decided to give his resignation to Pati Chapoy, the head of the show. He then left Monterrey and headed to Mexico City broke and in poor health.

Despite the bad experience and his preference for writing, Cueva still appears on broadcast, both in television and radio. From 1999 to 2000 he appeared occasionally on Televisa as a critic. In 2002 he made appearances on a show called El Pozo of CNI. From 2004 to 2006 he appeared regularly on Canal 22. From 2005 to 2008 he appeared regularly on Canal 52MX on the MVS cable network . Also in 2005, he began to appear regularly on the program "Alta definición" (High definition) on Proyecto 40, which he created. He continues to appear with this show. He has also done specials such as repeated appearances on TV Azteca to give commentaries on the television show "Lost" in 2006.

He also gives presentations on radio stations such as MVS Radio, Radio Fórmula, Multimedios Radio de Monterrey, Radio Educación, XEW, Radio 13 and ACIR.

=== Other activities ===
In addition to his work in the media, he has had other activities, also closely relating to his work as a television critic. He has served as a judge in various festivals and television events, such as at the International Academy of Television Arts and Sciences, the Festival y Mercado de la Telenovela en Iberoamérica, the Festival Pantalla de Cristal and the Festival de Video Universitario in Venezuela. He has given multiple seminars and workshops in journalism in Mexico and Central America and has taught classes at the Universidad Regiomontana (1989 – 1990) and the Centro de Capacitación de Escritores de Televisa (2009). In 2006 he founded Alvaro Cueva presenta Súper TV a magazine about television.
