= Letras Libres =

Mexican literary magazine

- April 2006 issue
- Director: Enrique Krauze
- Categories: Literature
- Frequency: Monthly
- Publisher: Editorial Vuelta
- First issue: 1999; 27 years ago
- Country: Mexico and Spain
- Based in: Mexico City, Mexico
- Language: Spanish
- Website: Letras Libres
- ISSN: 1405-7840

Letras Libres is a Spanish-language monthly literary magazine published in Mexico and Spain.

== History and profile ==
Letras Libres, printed since 1999 in Mexico and since 2001 in Spain, has an average of eighteen to twenty articles per issue. Mexican historian Enrique Krauze is the founder of the magazine and he is also editor. The publisher is Editorial Vuelta, a prominent publishing company co-founded by the Nobel Prize laureate in Literature, Octavio Paz. The headquarters of the magazine is in Mexico City.

The magazine is heir to previous Latin American literary magazines, specifically Vuelta, which ceased publication in 1998 with the death of its founder Paz.

According to statistics publicized by the magazine on its tenth anniversary, 40% of its pieces during its first decade have been written by Mexican authors, 25% by non-Mexican Spanish-speakers, and 25% by non Spanish-speakers. The latter works were translated specifically for the magazine.

Some of the regular contributors of the magazine are leading intellectuals of Latin America and other countries, including Mario Vargas Llosa, Gabriel Zaid, Rodrigo Fresán, Guillermo Sheridan, Fernando Savater, Hugo Hiriart, Juan Villoro, Alberto Barrera Tyszka, José de la Colina, José Emilio Pacheco, Enrique Vila-Matas, Adolfo Castañón, Roger Bartra, David Rieff, Bisam Álvaro, Jorge Edwards and Patricio Pron.

Letras Libres publishes about history, culture, and social issues. Peter Standish and Steven Bell classified Letras Libres as "right-wing" in its political views, stating it represents the Mexican cultural and literary establishment, beginning in the 1980s.
