= Enrique Serna =

Mexican writer

Enrique Serna Rodríguez (born 11 January 1959) is a Mexican writer.

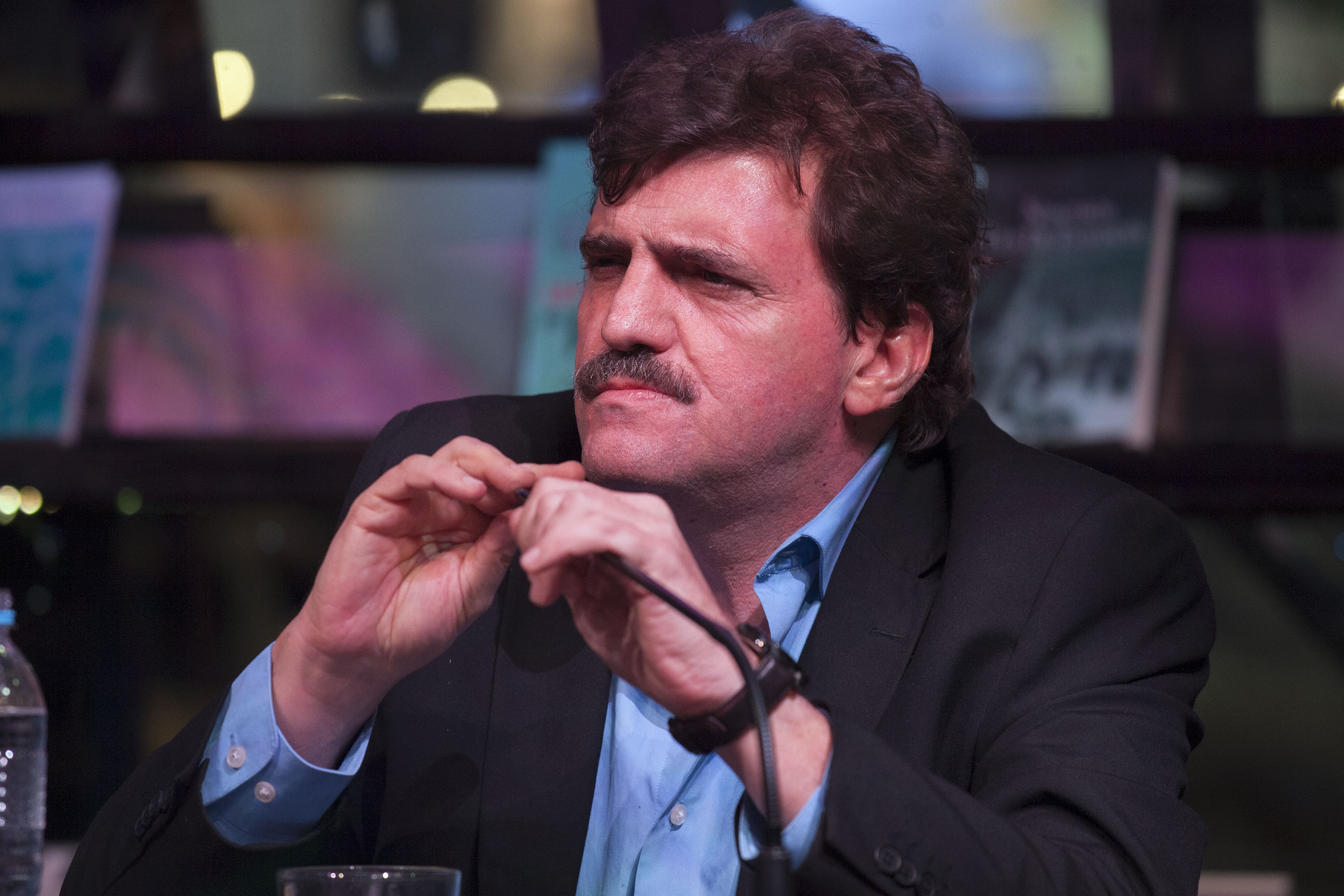
Enrique Serna

Serna was born in Mexico City. He is the son of Rosa Rodríguez Borrás and Ricardo Serna Rivera, who instilled a love of reading in him, and as a child he became fond of classic fantastic literature. Serna did his primary schooling at Instituto Patria and secondary at Instituto Simón Bolívar; in 1978 he enrolled in Journalism at UNAM's Faculty of Political Sciences, switched after three semesters to Hispanic Literature, and graduated in 1985 with a thesis on the poetry of Sandoval Zapata; he later received a scholarship for graduate study at Bryn Mawr College but left the program. Before devoting himself entirely to literature, he was a scriptwriter for various Mexican soap operas and wrote biographies of popular Mexican figures as well as working in the advertising industry as a copywriter. He has published the novels Señorita México, Uno soñaba que era rey, El miedo a los animales, El seductor de la patria (winner of the Mazatlán Prize), Ángeles del abismo (winner of the Colima Prize), Fruta verde, La sangre erguida (winner of the Antonin Artaud Prize) and La doble vida de Jesús. His short stories, collected in his books Amores de segunda mano, El orgasmógrafo and La ternura caníbal have been included in most anthologies of contemporary Mexican short stories. In 2003 Gabriel García Márquez named Serna as one of the best Mexican short story writers in an anthology published by Cambio review. As an essayist, Serna has published three books that share the dark humor of his fiction: Las caricaturas me hacen llorar, Giros negros and Genealogía de la soberbia intelectual. Some of his works have been translated into French, Italian, German, English and Portuguese. He presently writes a monthly article for the influential Mexican cultural review Letras Libres.

== Works ==
=== Novels ===
- Señorita México (1987)
- Uno soñaba que era rey (1989)
- El miedo a los animales (1995)
- El seductor de la patria (1999)
- Ángeles del abismo (2004)
- Fruta Verde (2006)
- La sangre erguida (2010)
- La doble vida de Jesús (2014)
- El vendedor de silencio (2019)

=== Short stories ===
- Amores de segunda mano (1991)
- El orgasmógrafo (2001)
- La ternura caníbal (2013)

=== Essays ===
- Las caricaturas me hacen llorar (1996)
- Giros negros (2008)
- Genealogía de la soberbia intelectual (2013)

=== Biography ===
- Jorge el bueno: La vida de Jorge Negrete (1993)
- Todas mis guerras (1993), on María Félix. He is listed as editor but was, in fact, the book's ghostwriter.

=== Children's literature ===
- La caverna encantada (1997)
- La recompensa de Nefru (2012)

=== Other work ===
- Los mejores cuentos mexicanos (2000) (Compiler)
- Tríptico de juegos (2002), by Carlos Olmos (Prologue)
- Teatro completo (2007), by Carlos Olmos (Prologue and Editor)

== Awards ==
- Premio Mazatlán de Literatura, 2000, for El seductor de la patria
- Premio Bellas Artes de Narrativa Colima, 2004, for Ángeles del abismo
- Premio Antonin Artaud, 2011, for La sangre erguida
- Premio Xavier Villaurrutia, 2019, for El vendedor de silencio
- Premio Excelencia en las Letras "José Emilio Pacheco," 2020, for his body of work
- Premio Jorge Ibargüengoitia de Literatura (Universidad de Guanajuato), 2025, for his career/body of work
