= El vampiro de la colonia Roma =

1979 novel by Luis Zapata

- Author: Luis Zapata Quiroz
- Language: Spanish
- Set in: Mexico City
- Publisher: Grijalbo
- Publication date: 1979
- Publication place: Mexico
- Media type: Novel
- Awards: Juan Grijalbo Prize

El vampiro de la colonia Roma (English: The Vampire of Colonia Roma) is a novel by Mexican writer Luis Zapata Quiroz. Some critics consider it to be the definitive work of LGBT literature in Mexico. Its publication inspired a change in direction regarding the scorn and silence around homosexuality in literature. Since El vampiro de la colonia Roma was published, other authors have taken on the subject of homosexuality without hesitation. The novel was published in 1979 after winning the Juan Grijalbo Prize.

== Plot ==
Adonis García is the nickname for a gay male prostitute in Mexico City. The book tells the story of his life though fictional interviews with a writer who records his extremely long monologue on magnetic tape. García talks about his first memories through 25 years of his life, when the recording ends.

== Genre and impact ==
El vampiro de la colonia Roma is a picaresque novel with an erotic theme. It is written in the form of a monologue beginning with recordings on magnetic tape that Luis Zapata obtained from an interview with Osiris Pérez. According to León Guillermo Gutiérrez, it shed light on:

The hypocrisy of Mexican society, in which a lot of effort had been taken to hide in the corner of the closet: the practical, everyday life of homosexuality in all social spheres. Zapata does not settle for coming out of the closet, he takes it and travels by foot, car, bus, or motorcycle through the streets, avenues, parks, restaurants, and movie theaters of the big city and other latitudes of the country’s geography.

Its publication provoked a national, and even international, scandal over its homosexual content. The scandal in Mexico, according to José Joaquín Blanco, responded "to the sanctimoniousness that thrives in the government, in the press, in some businesses, in the academy, and luckily it did not find its echo." Some prestigious writers, like Juan Rulfo and Sergio Magaña, attacked the book without having read it, going as far as to recommend selling the book in plastic bags to prevent people from leafing through what was considered a "pornographic" text. Today, El vampire de la colonia Roma is considered a classic work in gay Mexican and Latin American literature.

== Commemorating thirty years since publication ==
In 2009, to celebrate 30 years since the book's initial publication, various commemorative festivities were held in Mexico City: at the XXX International Book Fair (Feria Internacional del Libro) in the Palacio de Minería, at the Faculty of Philosophy and Letters at the National Autonomous University of Mexico, and at the Palacio de Bellas Artes.

== Translations ==
In the United States, a translation was published under the title Adonis García, A Picaresque Novel in 1981 and it received favorable critiques given that—as noted by the author, Luis Zapata, himself—the U.S. did not have the same prejudices nor Mexico's macho tradition. In the United Kingdom, however, the work was confiscated by authorities for being "indecent, pornographic, and obscene."

== Bibliography ==
- Hernandez-Rodriguez, R. “The Dark Night of Mexico: Picaresque, Sexuality, and Violence in El vampiro de la colonia Roma and Las púberes canéforas” in Growing Up in Latin America. Child and Youth Agency in Contemporary Popular Culture. Marco Ramirez Rojas & Pilar Osorio Lora, eds. Lexington Books, 2022.
- León Guillermo Gutiérrez, Sesenta años del cuento mexicano de temática gay. Anales de Literatura Hispanoamericana, vol. 41, pp. 277–296.
- León Guillermo Gutiérrez, El vampiro de la colonia Roma. Función del espacio y del cuerpo en el discurso homoerótico, Redalyc (Red de Revistas Científicas de América Latina y el Caribe, España y Portugal).
- Luis Ulloa (2007), El tema homosexual en la narrativa mexicana del siglo XX[1], [presentation]. Leída en el Coloquio de Cultura Mexicana (Universidad de Guadalajara/Uppsala Universitet).

== See also ==
- LGBT literature in Mexico
- Luis Zapata
- Colonia Roma
