= Vuelta (magazine) =

Defunct literary magazine published in Mexico

- Categories: Literary magazine
- Founder: Octavio Paz
- Founded: 1976
- Final issue: 1998
- Country: Mexico
- Based in: Mexico City
- Language: Spanish

Vuelta was a Spanish-language literary magazine published in Mexico City, Mexico, from 1976 to 1998. It was founded by poet Octavio Paz, who won the Nobel Prize for Literature. The magazine, successor to the earlier Plural (founded 1971), closed after his death. Its role was inherited by Letras Libres.

== History and profile ==
Vuelta was founded by poet Octavio Paz in December 1976 following the controversial dismantling of the workers' cooperative that ran the daily newspaper Excélsior. The magazine ceased publication following Paz's death in 1998.

The magazine published an important group of international intellectuals and writers, from Mexico, Latin America, the United States, and Europe, many of whom Paz met during his remarkable career. These included Carlos Fuentes, Mario Vargas Llosa, Gabriel Zaid, E.M. Cioran, Enrique Krauze, Jorge Luis Borges, Adolfo Bioy Casares, Samuel Beckett, Milan Kundera, Czesław Miłosz, Susan Sontag, John Kenneth Galbraith, Leszek Kołakowski, Guillermo Cabrera Infante, Isaiah Berlin, and Reinaldo Arenas, among others.

Paz published a collection of poems under the title Vuelta, which were written between 1969 and 1974.

In 1988, historian Enrique Krauze criticized Carlos Fuentes and his fiction in an article Vuelta, dubbing him a "guerrilla dandy" for the perceived gap between his Marxist politics and his personal lifestyle, as well as his long absences from the country he wrote about. This essay contributed to a permanent rift between Paz and Fuentes, formerly close friends, who were also estranged because of Fuentes' support for the Sandinistas.

Vuelta received the 1993 Prince of Asturias Award for Communications and Humanities. In the award, Vuelta was described as "one of the most important cultural phenomena in the Spanish language".
