= LGBTQ literature in Guatemala =

History of LGBTQ+ literature in Guatemala

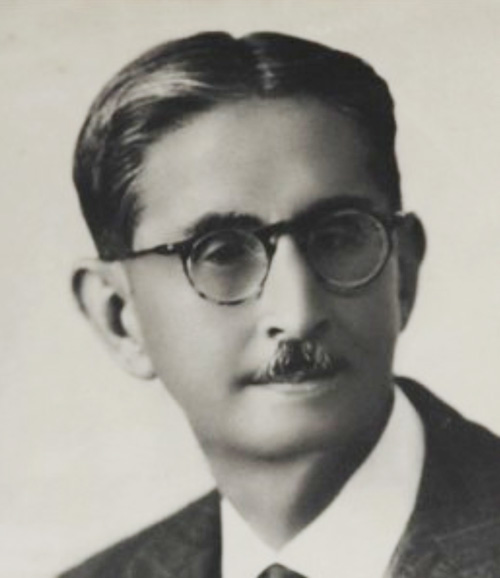
Rafael Arévalo Martínez, author of the story "The Man Who Looked Like a Horse" (1914).

LGBTQ literature in Guatemala consists of literary works written by Guatemalan authors that involve plots, themes, or characters that are part of or related to sexual diversity. Due to the conservative nature of Guatemalan society, literary works with LGBT themes have traditionally been published by independent publishers or self-managed cultural collectives.

The first representations of sexual diversity in Guatemalan literature did not, for the most part, address the issue explicitly, due to suspicion regarding the social intolerance of the time. This was the case of Rafael Arévalo Martínez, who in 1914 published his short story The Man Who Looked Like a Horse (1914), considered an essential work in Latin American LGBTQ literature and where he recounts the birth of the friendship (and subsequent distancing) between the protagonist and a man who produces an intense affinity, which has been interpreted as a romantic attraction by the language used in the text. Before Arévalo, one of the few Guatemalan authors to address homosexuality was Enrique Gómez Carrillo, particularly in his novel Of Love, Pain, and Vice (1898), who was able to do so freely by living outside the country.

In 1959, the play La calle del sexo verde by Hugo Carrillo premiered, notable for being the first Guatemalan literary work to address sexual diversity as one of its central themes, although it did so in a negative context. The following decades saw the emergence of Mario Alberto Carrera, who became the Guatemalan writer who most extensively addressed sexual diversity to date after a series of works, including Cuentos psicoeroticos (1979), Hogar, dulce hogar (1982) and especially in Don Camaleón (1985), in which he portrayed the spaces frequented by LGBTQ people at the time through a homosexual character. Other writers to explore the topic during these years were Francisco Nájera and Manuel Corleto. However, apart from them and the aforementioned figures, LGBTQ literature in Guatemala had few exponents during the 20th century.

The early years of the 21st century were marked by the emergence of a number of countercultural collectives created by LGBTQ+ activists to impact local culture. Prominent among these were Manuel Tzoc, Fabrizio Quemé, Numa Dávila, and Rebeca Lane.

== First representations ==
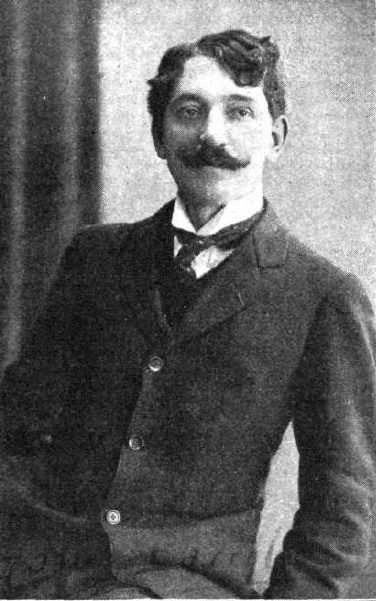
Enrique Gómez Carrillo, author of Of Love, Pain and Vice (1898).

One of the first Central American writers to address homosexuality in his writing was the Guatemalan Enrique Gómez Carrillo, particularly in his Tres novelas inmorales (1919), a compilation work made up of three short novels published between 1898 and 1899 where he portrays Parisian society at the end of the 19th century.

Because they dealt with themes such as sexuality, prostitution and dandyism, the works generated indignation in Guatemala at the time, especially the first of them, Of Love, Pain and Vice (1898), which critics accused of promoting homosexuality, infidelity and sexual freedom.

The novel tells the story of Liliana, a widowed marchioness known as The Doll who explores her sexual desires by challenging the male opinions of her acquaintances. Among the characters in the play, in addition to "androgynous" men, there is Margarita del Campo, a friend of Liliana who makes a pass at her and with whom a lesbian relationship is later suggested. Although the consummation of this encounter is never made explicit, other characters spread the rumor and the interactions between the characters themselves seem to suggest it, including the scenes in which Margarita "took her little friend in her arms and held her tightly against her chest, kissing her hair and the nape of her neck at the same time."

Gómez Carrillo continued to include depictions of female homosexuality in some of her later works, most notably the short story Marta y Hortensia, published in her book Souls and Brains: Sentimental Stories, Parisian Intimacies, etc. (1900). The story, whose plot references the novel The Girl with the Golden Eyes (1835) by Honoré de Balzac, follows the story of a man who discovers that his wife and his sister have begun a secret affair. Although the discovery fills him with rage, he ultimately decides not to confront them.

Other works by Gómez Carrillo that address lesbianism include Bohemia sentimental (1899), the second of the Tres novelas inmorales, and The Second Book of Women (1921) where he describes the homosexuality of historical figures such as the Greek poet Sappho, as well as Paul Verlaine and Socrates, and mocks academics who tried to deny it.

== 20th century ==
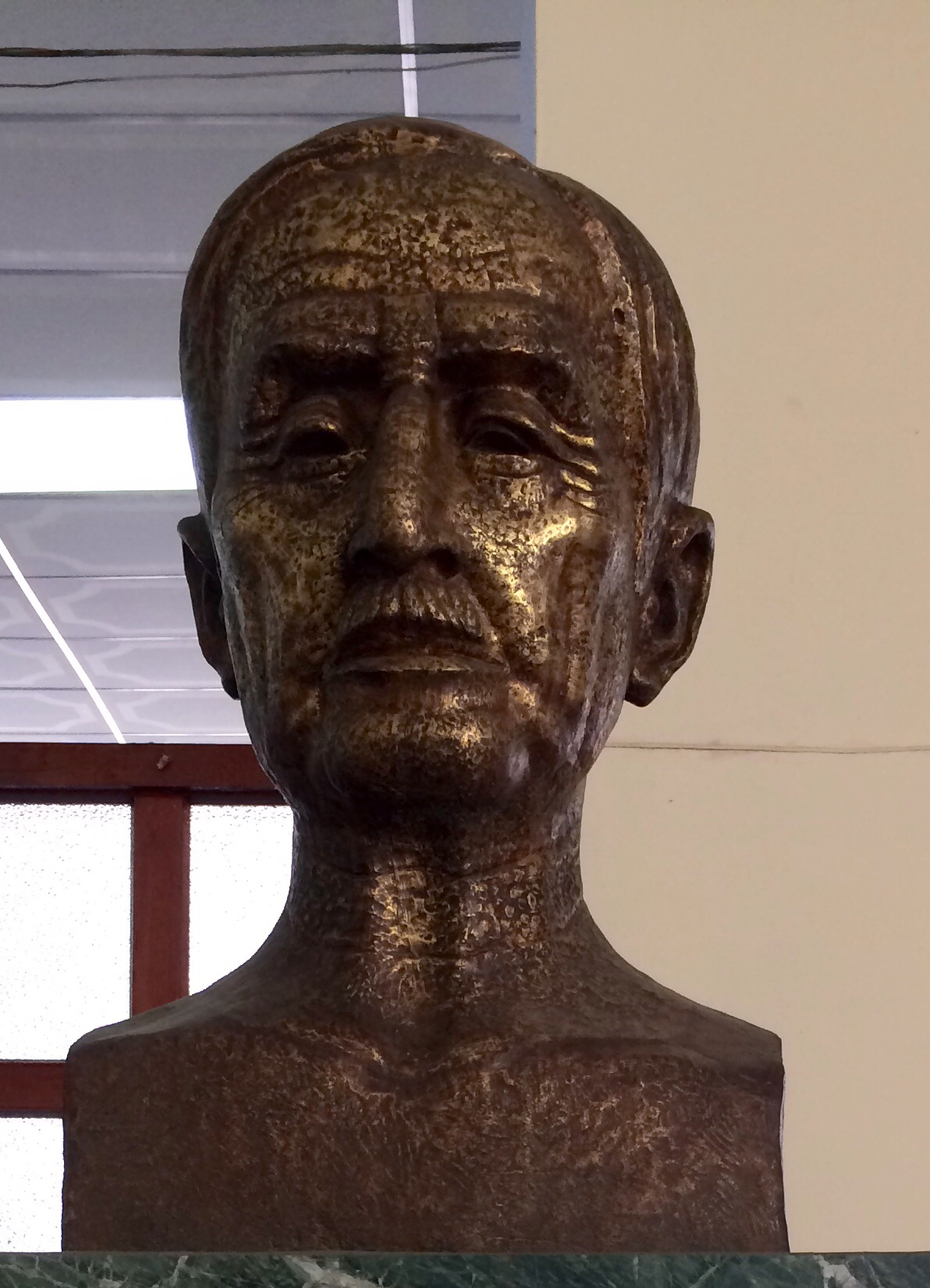
Bust of Rafael Arévalo Martínez.

Well into the 20th century, some of the earliest depictions of male homosexuality in Guatemalan literature are found in the fiction of Rafael Arévalo Martínez. Several of his works portray intense male friendships in which scholars have found homoerotic traits, especially in The Man Who Looked Like a Horse (1914); his most famous story, considered an essential text in the history of homosexuality in Latin American literature. The story's plot narrates the beginning of a friendship and the subsequent breakup between the protagonist and a man known as the Lord of Aretal, who leaves the former dazzled. The text includes moments that show the protagonist's intense desire for his friend, with phrases like "at his touch I began to burn" and "I received from that man something I had been missing before." A passage that shows this desire states:

At first, dazzled, I stretched out completely, I spread out completely, like a great white sheet, to increase my contact surface with the generous donor. The antennae of my soul dilated, touched him, and returned, trembling, moved, and joyful, to give me the good news: "This is the man you were waiting for; this is the man through whom you looked out for all unknown souls, because your intuition had already affirmed to you that one day you would be enriched by the coming of a unique being. The avidity with which you took, perceived, and cast away so many souls who made themselves desired and disappointed your hope, will today be amply satisfied: bend down and drink of this water."

The publication of the story sparked controversy due to its subject matter. It soon became an open secret that the man from Aretal in the plot was a representation of Porfirio Barba Jacob, a homosexual Colombian poet who later confirmed this rumor. Barba also revealed that he had initially asked Arévalo not to publish the story, as it was too revealing of his sexual orientation. In response to the controversy, Arévalo attempted to deny the homoerotic attraction in the story, although years later he stated, in relation to the encounter with Barba that inspired him to write the story: "From the moment I met him I felt attracted to him. I had the soul of an adolescent then... there was something in that homosexual that fitted in all its parts with something else of mine, and together with this one they formed a radiant whole." Additionally, in his novel Nights in the Palace of the Nunciature (1927), Arévalo again included the Lord of Aretal as a character, where he without hesitation identifies him as a "sodomite."

Another early work to depict homosexuality was the play La Rafaila (1918), by Enrique de la Riva, although it was in a mocking tone. Beyond these performances, it wasn't until 1959 that a Guatemalan play would address homosexuality as a central theme. That year, the play La calle del sexo verde by playwright Hugo Carrillo premiered. The play, which is framed in the aesthetics of grotesque theatre, tells in three acts separate stories that take place on the same street and are connected by the character of a beggar. One of them follows a teenager who refuses to accept his homosexuality and who later gives in to the seduction of an older man, which fills him with shame and leads him to state, in a defeated tone: "I'd rather go to hell than return home." This seduction, which is presented in the play in the context of corruption of minors, is described by Carrillo in the following dialogue:

Man: Accept your life as it is. Don't try to change it. Nobody changes their destiny.
Teenager: Nobody?
Man: Nobody!
Teenager: But I don't want to be like that...
Man: We're on the path, and it's better to walk it. And walk it well. Nobody can stop. Much less go back. You have to keep going. I'll help you. You'll see.
Teenager: But don't you understand that I don't want to be the way I am? I don't.

In the second half of the 20th century, Mario Alberto Carrera emerged, becoming the author of his generation who most extensively explored LGBT themes in his writing. Among his first works to address the subject was the play La cólera (1976), later released under the title Expreso a Pandora, as well as the short story collection Cuentos psicoeroticos (1979), particularly in stories such as Marilyn, inspired by the suicide of Arnoldo Legrand. These were followed by the novel Home, Sweet Home (1982), winner of the Quetzal de Oro and which tells the story of a family in which the youngest son explores his sexuality with other children, and Don Camaleón (1985), much more explicit in its approach to sexual diversity, which caused controversy at the time. Don Camaleón has as its protagonist a homosexual man known as Rubencito and follows his progress through the streets of Guatemala City near the National Palace of Culture and the Central Market in search of opportunities for cruising, as well as on Fifth Avenue, a traditional space for prostitution and frequented by transgender women and gay men.

Other writers who addressed LGBT issues in these years were Francisco Nájera and Manuel Corleto, although, in Corleto's case, the representation was negative. In his novel With Every Drop of Blood from the Wound (1997), winner of the Rogelio Sinán Central American Literature Prize, Corleto presents two friends who remember a traumatic event from their childhood: the discovery of the dismembered corpse of a homosexual watchmaker who dedicated himself to repairing dolls and who had raped the younger brother of one of the protagonists.

== 21st century ==
The beginning of the 21st century saw the emergence of a series of dissident cultural manifestations in Guatemala focused on literary production, particularly that related to sexual diversity. One of the first works of these years was Cartas a Diego (2004), an epistolary novel that addresses love between men and was published under the pseudonym José Griss. Other LGBT works that appeared in these years included the autobiographical novel Pecado nefando (2006) by Mario Loarca Pineda, in which he recounts his life as a young man in a religious company and explores themes such as sexual abuse, political conflicts in Central America and repressed homosexuality; as well as the collection of stories Muñeca mala (2008), by Carmen Matute, which includes stories such as Paulina, which tells the story of a lesbian woman with the same name who falls in love with a heterosexual friend and, upon understanding that her feelings would not be reciprocated, decides to commit suicide.

Manuel Tzoc, considered an important exponent of contemporary Guatemalan LGBT poetry, published his first work in 2006, Esco-p(0)etas para una muerte en versos b…ala, with the independent publishing house Ediciones Bizarras. In later years, Tzoc continued to explore sexual dissidence in his poetry in works such as Textos insanos (2009) and GAY(O) (2019), the latter considered a "homo-porn" text.

The 2010s were notable for the emergence of various countercultural movements and projects focusing on sexual diversity, including the fanzine La Macha, started in 2014 by poet Fabrizio Quemé and aimed at publishing LGBT literary content. Local LGBT writers who have contributed to an issue of the fanzine include, among others, Gabriela Maldonado, Rebeca Lane and Dulce Paniagua. The following year, Manuel Tzoc founded the publishing house La Maleta Ilegal, together with Chilean writer Rodrigo Arenas Carter, which focused on producing dissident literature. In addition to Tzoc's own texts, the publishing house published LGBT-oriented works such as Arenas Carter's Pulp (2016) and Fabrizio Quemé's Perverso & Disfórico (2015). Another one of these cultural spaces was Cuirpoétikas, which was started in 2016 by the writer Numa Dávila with the help of Tzoc and Arenas Carter, as an LGBT art showcase and later became a local creative movement.

In 2016, the novel Gavilán Blues was also published, by the Swiss writer based in Guatemala Tito Bassi, which tells the story of a family of landowners in which the firstborn son is gay, which leads him to a conflict due to the conservative character and expectations of his family.

== See also ==
- Guatemalan literature
- LGBTQ literature in El Salvador
- LGBTQ literature in Mexico
- LGBTQ rights in Guatemala

== Bibliographies ==
- Navarrete, Yosahandi (2020). "La persecución del deseo en Del amor, del dolor y del vicio". Del amor, del dolor y del vicio (PDF). Instituto de Investigaciones Filológicas de la UNAM.
- Velásquez, Antonio (2015). Miradas sobre la representación de la homosexualidad en la literatura centroamericana y el caso de Trágame tierra. Vol. 59 (2 ed.). The Latin Americanist. pp. 51–66. ISSN 1557-203X.
- Sueza, María José (2008). París, itinerario artístico en la obra de Enrique Gómez Carrillo (PDF). Universidad de Jaén. Archived from the original on 2024-10-06.
