= Luis Zapata (writer) =

Mexican writer (1951–2020)

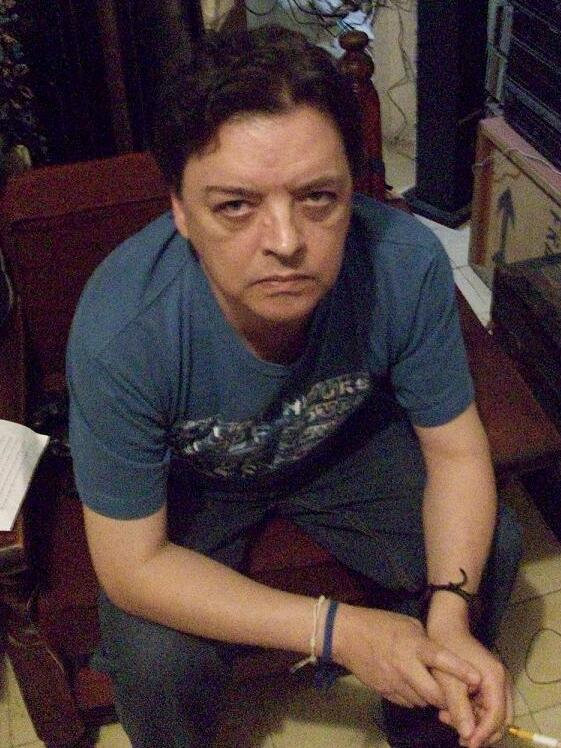
- Zapata in 2009
- Born: Luis Zapata Quiroz; 27 April 1951; Chilpancingo, Guerrero, Mexico
- Died: 4 November 2020 (aged 69); Cuernavaca, Mexico
- Education: National Autonomous University of Mexico
- Occupations: Writer, novelist
- Known for: El vampiro de la colonia Roma

Luis Zapata Quiroz (27 April 1951 – 4 November 2020) was one of the most prominent gay writers in Mexican literature.

== Career ==
Born in Chilpancingo, Guerrero, on 27 April 1951, Luis Zapata studied French literature at the National Autonomous University of Mexico (UNAM). In addition to his novels (most famously, El vampiro de la colonia Roma, 1979), he also wrote plays and short stories and was active in the field of cultural journalism. He was also a specialist translator of medieval French.

Zapata died in Cuernavaca on 4 November 2020, after being hospitalized in Morelos a month earlier.

== Select Novels ==
- Hasta en las mejores familias (Even in the Best of Families), 1975
- El vampiro de la colonia Roma (Adonis Garcia, A Picaresque Novel), 1979
- De pétalos perennes (Perennial Petals), 1981
- Melodrama, 1983
- En jirones (In Tatters), 1985
- La hermana secreta de Angélica María (Angélica Maria's Secret Sister), 1989
- ¿Por qué mejor no nos vamos? (Why Don't We Just Leave?), 1992
- La más fuerte pasión (The Strongest Passion), 1995
- Los postulados del buen golpista, 1995
- Siete noches junto al mar, 1999
- La historia de siempre (The Same Story As Always), 2007
- Escena y farsa es la vida (2014)
- Como sombras y sueños (2014)
- Autobiografía póstuma (2014)
