= Fernando Zamora (writer) =

Mexican-American writer (born 1979)

Fernando Zamora (born February 14, 1979) is a Mexican-American writer.

== Biography ==
Born in Mexico City, 14 February 1979, he is a novelist and screenwriter. His work addresses sexual diversity. Those under the water tells the secret love and friendship between Paul Aguirre (a Mexican General during the Mexican Revolution) and Hugo Estrada. This relationship will lead them both to destruction. In his second novel, Suite of love and death, he uses diverse points of view to tell the story of the love of a piano teacher for his dear student Cristobal.
