= Sergio Loo =

Mexican poet and novelist

- Born: 15 April 1982; Mexico City
- Died: 28 January 2014 (aged 31); Mexico City
- Occupation: Writer

Sergio Carrillo Loo (April 15, 1982 in Ciudad de México – January 28, 2014) was a Mexican poet and novelist.

== Biography ==
Sergio Loo was born on 15 April 1982 in Mexico City. He graduated from the Escuela de la Sociedad General de Escritores de México (SOGEM) and the Especialización en Literatura Mexicana del Siglo XX (UAM Azcapotzalco). He was the recipient Poesía de Jóvenes Creadores grant from the National Endowment for Culture and the Arts in Mexico (FONCA) between 2013 and 2014, and he was a contributor to national publications, while participating in various cultural projects. From 1997 to 2003, he formed part of the Parodia de Vivos, a multidisciplinary collective, and was preparing an anthology of Mexican poets born after 1977.

He collaborated in Fantasiofrénia, Antología del cuento dañado (2003), Paso al Frente (2004), Descifrar el Laberinto (2005) El fungible: especial de relatos (2006). In 2006, he published his first book of poems titled Claveles automáticos with Harakiri plaquettes, 2006. In 2007, he published Sus brazos labios en mi boca rodando (Fondo Editorial Tierra Adentro, 2007), with a digital version that was published in 2013 by the Spanish publishing house Foc. In 2010, he received a grant to study abroad at the Universidad Pompeu Fabra in Barcelona, Spain.

"It is the painful and sentimental chronicle of a generation, of an era; it is a hymn to friendship and disloyalty; it is a cry of horror at the transience of things, of life. And it is also the self-portrait of marginalized beings who find a refuge for their differences in other marginalized beings. (Drug addicts, homosexuals, dark identities, drug traffickers ...)"

In 2012, he published Guía Roji (IVEC, 2012). After his death, the Universidad Autónoma de Nuevo León published Postales desde mi cabeza (UANL, 2014). In November 2015, Ediciones Acapulco published the posthumous book Operación al cuerpo enfermo, in which the lines between artistic, literary and sexual genres are erased to serve one vital purpose: to bear witness to the author's path toward death.

In addition to dedicating himself to poetry and narrative texts, Loo also participated as co-scriptwriter for the short films Atmósfera (2010) and Nubes flotantes (2013), and for the feature film Yo soy la felicidad de este mundo (2014) by Mexican director Julián Hernández. Hernández also directed the short film Muchachos en la azotea (2016), based on one of Loo's ideas.

=== Death ===
Sergio Loo died in Mexico City on 28 January 2014, at the age of 31 due to complications from the cancer that had been detected in his leg in 2011. He never denied his homosexuality, an integral element to understanding his work.

=== Poetry ===
- Claveles automáticos (Harakiri ediciones, 2006)
- Sus brazos labios en mi boca rodando (Fondo Editorial Tierra Adentro, 2007)
- Guía Roji (IVEC, 2012)
- Postales desde mi cabeza (Universidad Autónoma de Nuevo León, 2014)
- Operación al cuerpo enfermo (Ediciones Acapulco, 2015). Posthumous edition.
- Operación al Cuerpo Enfermo / Operation on a Malignant Body (Kin(d)* Texts & Projects, 2019). Posthumous edition, translated into English by Will Stockton.

=== Novel ===
- House: retratos desarmables (Zeta, 2011)
- Narvarte pesadilla (Editorial MoHo, 2017). Posthumous edition.
