= Luis González de Alba =

Mexican writer, psychologist, intellectual and popular science writer (1944–2016)

- Born: March 6, 1944; Charcas, San Luis Potosí
- Died: October 2, 2016 (aged 72)
- Cause of death: Suicide (bullet wound)
- Education: National Autonomous University of Mexico
- Occupation(s): Writer and activist
- Known for: Los días y los años

Luis González de Alba (March 6, 1944 – October 2, 2016) was a Mexican writer, psychologist, intellectual, and popular science writer.

== Biography ==
=== Early years and education ===
Luis González de Alba was born in the town of Charcas in the state of San Luis Potosí, but his family moved to Guadalajara, Jalisco, when he was ten years old. He studied psychology at the National Autonomous University of Mexico (UNAM), although he never practiced because, after completing his studies, he got involved in the Mexican Movement of 1968. Afterwards, he primarily dedicated himself to writing and to his own business like restaurants and gay bars.

González de Alba collaborated with various Mexican media outlets like Grupo Milenio, Excélsior, Punto, Punto de Partida, Revista de Revistas, Siempre!, Unomásuno, and Nexos, mainly writing opinion pieces and science journalism. In addition to his work in magazines and newspapers, he also published novels, short stories, essays, and poetry.

=== National Strike Council ===
Upon completing his studies, Luis González de Alba joined the National Strike Council, which led the 1968 Mexican Student Movement. On October 2, 1968, he was apprehended during the Tlatelolco massacre and was imprisoned in the Palacio de Lecumberri for two years. While there, he studied Hebrew and wrote his first novel, Los días y los años ("The Days and the Years"), in which he gave his own account of what happened in the student movement. After his release, he underwent a self-imposed exile in Chile for a year and later traveled through Argentina and Brazil.

=== Homosexual activism ===
As an out homosexual, in 1975, Luis González de Alba, along with theater director Nancy Cárdenas and writer Carlos Monsiváis, published the first Mexican manifesto in defense of homosexuality in the magazine Siempre! During the 1970s and 1980s, he was connected to movements and figures on the Mexican left—an ideology he later abandoned, converting instead into a fierce critic.

Luis González de Alba was always involved in defending members of the lesbian, gay, bisexual, trans, and intersex community (LGBT), and was one of the founders of the Frente Homosexual de Acción Revolucionaria (Homosexual Front for Revolutionary Action), the first openly gay organization to carry out a protest in Mexico.

=== Founding La Jornada ===
In 1983, González de Alba stopped publishing in Unomásuno and spent a sabbatical year in Paris, France. Upon his return, he joined a group of journalists and writers to found the newspaper La Jornada, led by Carlos Payán. He also helped found the Unified Socialist Party of Mexico (PSUM), Mexican Socialist Party (PMS), and Party of the Democratic Revolution (PRD).

=== La ciencia en la calle ===
For over a decade, Luis González de Alba published a column called La ciencia en la calle ("Science on the Street") in the Mexican newspaper La Jornada, until he was fired from the paper in 1997 over a controversy with Elena Poniatowska, whose book, La noche de Tlatelolco: Testimonios de historia oral, included information from González de Alba's Los días y los años.

Later on, he published the column Se descubrió que... in Milenio—which covered science, politics, and national events—until he died.

== Participation in the October 2, 1968 movement ==
Luis González de Alba participated in the 1968 student movement when he was just 24 years old after studying psychology at the National Autonomous University of Mexico in Mexico City. During the bloody events of the Tlatelolco massacre on October 2, 1968, soldiers arrested González de Alba and held him in the Palacio de Lecumberri for two years. While there, he wrote his first novel, Los días y los años, in which he gave his own account of his experiences in Tlatelolco where some of his classmates and friends were tortured and killed.

As a prisoner, he learned Hebrew and, once freed, he underwent a self-imposed exile in Chile. He continued to publish while exiled, beginning with his second novel Y sigo siendo sola in 1979. He also made his way into essays, short stories, and science reporting.

González de Alba had a dispute with Elena Poniatowska over the launch of her book La noche de Tlatelolco: Testimonios de historia oral because she had not been part of the movement nor had she been to prison like he had. He said that he had lived through the solitude, suffering, and imprisonment. Some of González de Alba's comrades, like Gilberto Guevara Niebla, had also suffered in prison, including the solitude and lack of communication; however, they never offered their opinion about the book's commercial and critical success. At the end of the 1990s, the content in La noche de Tlatelolco was corrected. Its re-release was not a mere coincidence but rather the product of a legal ruling. The re-release represented proof of changes made by Poniatowska.

== Lawsuit against Elena Poniatowska ==
Though the article "Para limpiar la memoria," Luis González de Alba asked Elena Poniatowska to correct the paragraphs in La noche de Tlatelolco: Testimonios de historia oral that corresponded to his novel, Los días y los años. These paragraphs were used with permission, but after being interspersed and distorted in Poniatowska's narrative, they introduced falsehoods and serious inaccuracies and did not at all represent the facts.

The request explicitly referenced 28 paragraphs—a little more than 500 lines of text—that needed to be corrected and published in "a reissue, meticulously corrected and historically devoted to the facts".

He explained this request by stating that what was written in Los días y los años were González de Alba's narrative accounts. He was there for these incidents was the main participant of experiences related in the novel. The same could not be said for Elena Poniatowska who was not in Tlatelolco on October 2, 1968, and only indirectly learned of the events. "It must be based on interviews because, not having been familiar with events but rather through distorted accounts in the press at the time and conversations with her older son, who told her the most exciting parts, it should have been based on leaders and other participants informing her."

The publication of "Para limpiar la memoria," in the magazine Nexos resulted in Elena Poniatowska resigning from the magazine's editorial board. Furthermore, the publication of "Las fuentes de la historia / I" in La Jornada resulted in the newspaper's deputy director, Carmen Lira Saade, ordering, on Carlos Monsiváis's demand, Luis González de Alba to be fired.

Initially, Poniatowska did not agree to González de Alba's demands, which led to him filing a legal suit (a joint filing with Mexico's copyright office, the Instituto Nacional del Derecho de Autor) demanding that corrections be made to Poniatowska's book. After González de Alba won the suit, La noche de Tlatelolco was corrected and republished by the author. According to González de Alba, with the changes "the version of her story available today has improved a lot."

== Criticism ==
One of Luis González de Alba's most well-known incidents was his criticism of the Zapatista Army of National Liberation, calling Subcomandante Marcos "a fraud, a boor, and an imbecile."

In another incident, the Mexican National Human Rights Commission (then led by Raúl Plascencia Villanueva) accused students of the Ayotzinapa Rural Normal School for having started the gas station fire in Iguala, Guerrero, on December 12, 2011, which led to the death one of the gas station's employees, Gonzalo Rivas Cámara, who suffered third-degree burns on 40% of his body while trying to extinguish the fire (Rivas was posthumously awarded the Belisario Domínguez Medal of Honor in 2016). González de Alba joined in making these accusations, insinuating that the students were responsible for Rivas's death. From 2015 until he died, González de Alba used his weekly column Milenio Diario to consistently repeat the claims and was further agitated by the case of the Iguala mass kidnapping in 2014. The Ayotzinapa students denied having caused the conflagration, pointing out that it was probably the result of civil unrest.

== Suicide ==
Luis González de Alba committed suicide at the age of 72 in his house in Guadalajara, Jalisco, on October 2, 2016—the 48th anniversary of the Tlatelolco massacre. According to the forensic report, he died from a bullet wound to the thorax.

With the news of his death, media outlets dedicated space to remembering his life and work, as El Diario NTR Guadalajara did. However, the newspaper he helped found, La Jornada, did not.

== Published works ==
=== Novels ===
- Los días y los años (1971)
- Y sigo siendo sola (1979)
- Jacob, el suplantador (1988)
- Agápi mu (Amor mío) (1993)
- Los derechos de los malos y la angustia de Kepler (1998)
- Cielo de invierno (1999)
- El sol de la tarde (2003, with a new version in 2009)
- AMLO La construcción de un liderazgo fascinante (2007)
- Cuchillo de doble filo (2008)
- Otros días, otros años (2008)
- Olga (2010)
- No hubo barco para mí (2013)

=== Short stories ===
- El vino de los bravos (1981)

=== Poetry ===
- Malas compañías (1984)
- El sueño y la vigilia (2006)

=== Essays ===
- Las mentiras de mis maestros (2004)

=== Science writing ===
- Teoría de los grafos en las ciencias sociales (1984)
- Bases biológicas de la bisexualidad (1985)
- La orientación sexual: reflexiones sobre la bisexualidad originaria y la homosexualidad (2003)
- La ciencia, la calle y otras mentiras (1989)
- El burro de Sancho y el gato de Schrodinger:un paseo al trote por cien años de física cuántica y su inesperada relación con la conciencia (2001)
- Niño o niña. Las diferencias sexuales (2006)
- Maravillas y misterios de la física cuántica: un paseo por la física del siglo XX y su inesperada relación con la conciencia (2010)

=== Posthumous publications ===
- Mi último tequila (2016)
- Tlatelolco aquella tarde (2016)
