= Ethel Krauze =

Mexican writer (born 1954)

Ethel Kolteniuk Krauze
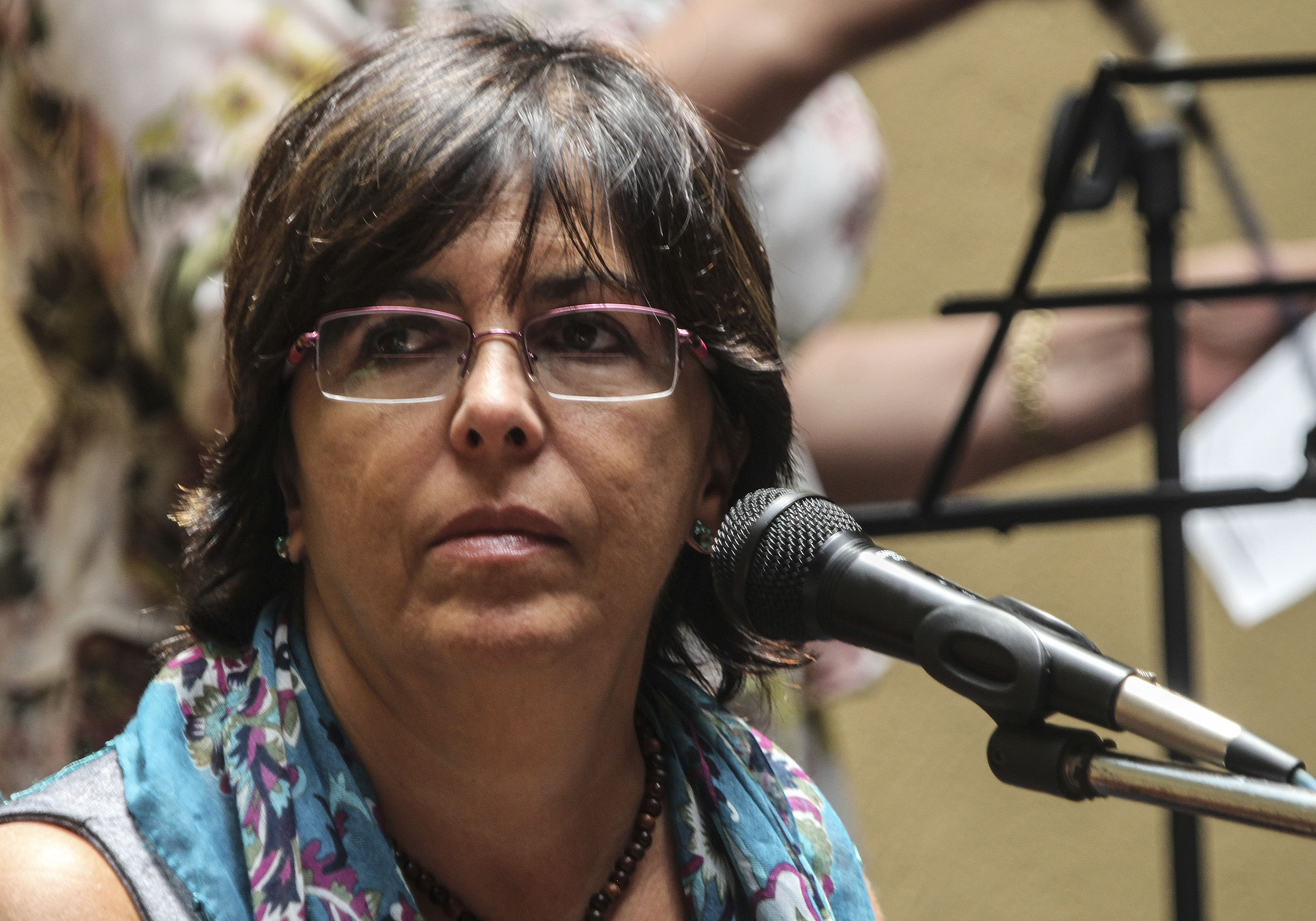
- Ethel Krauze at the Casa de Cultura Tamaulipas, Mexico City
- Born: June 14, 1954 (age 72); Mexico City, Mexico
- Education: National Autonomous University of Mexico
- Occupations: Writer, television presenter
- Notable work: Infinita
- Mother: Rosa Krauze
- Relatives: Berta Kolteniuk (sister), Miguel Krauze (brother), Enrique Krauze (cousin)
- Website: Luis Kolteniuk Talesnik

Ethel Krauze (Mexico City, June 14, 1954) is a Mexican writer and television presenter.

== Biography ==
Ethel Kolteniuk Krauze was born in 1954 in Mexico City to Polish philosopher Rosa Krauze Pacht and Russian doctor Luis Kolteniuk Talesnik, both Jews. She has a sister, Berta Kolteniuk, and a brother, Miguel. Her cousin is the writer Enrique Krauze.

She studied Hispanic languages and literature at the National Autonomous University of Mexico. Since then, she has served as the host for the television show Cara al Futuro, broadcast on Canal Once (Mexico). Krauze often collaborates with newspapers that have a national audience like El Universal and Excélsior.

Her novel Infinita ("Infinite") was one of the first to speak openly about lesbianism and it is considered a landmark work of LGBT literature in Mexico.

== Works ==
Some of Krauze's most notable works are:

- Intermedio para mujeres (1982)
- Para cantar (1984)
- Donde las cosas vuelan (1985)
- El lunes te amaré (1987)
- Canciones de amor antiguo (1988)
- Ha venido a buscarte (1989)
- Entre la cruz y la estrella (1990)
- Cómo acercarse a la poesía (1992)
- Infinita (1992)
- Mujeres en Nueva York (1992)
- Juan (1994)
- Houston (1996)
- Amoreto (1999)
- El secreto de la infidelidad (2000)
- Desnudando a la musa: ¿qué hay detrás del talento literario? (2011)
- Todos los hombres (2012)
- El país de las mandrágoras (2016)
- Samovar (Alfaguara, 2023)
