= Nexos =

Mexican cultural and political magazine

Coordinates: 19.412478°N 99.17824°W

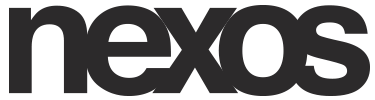

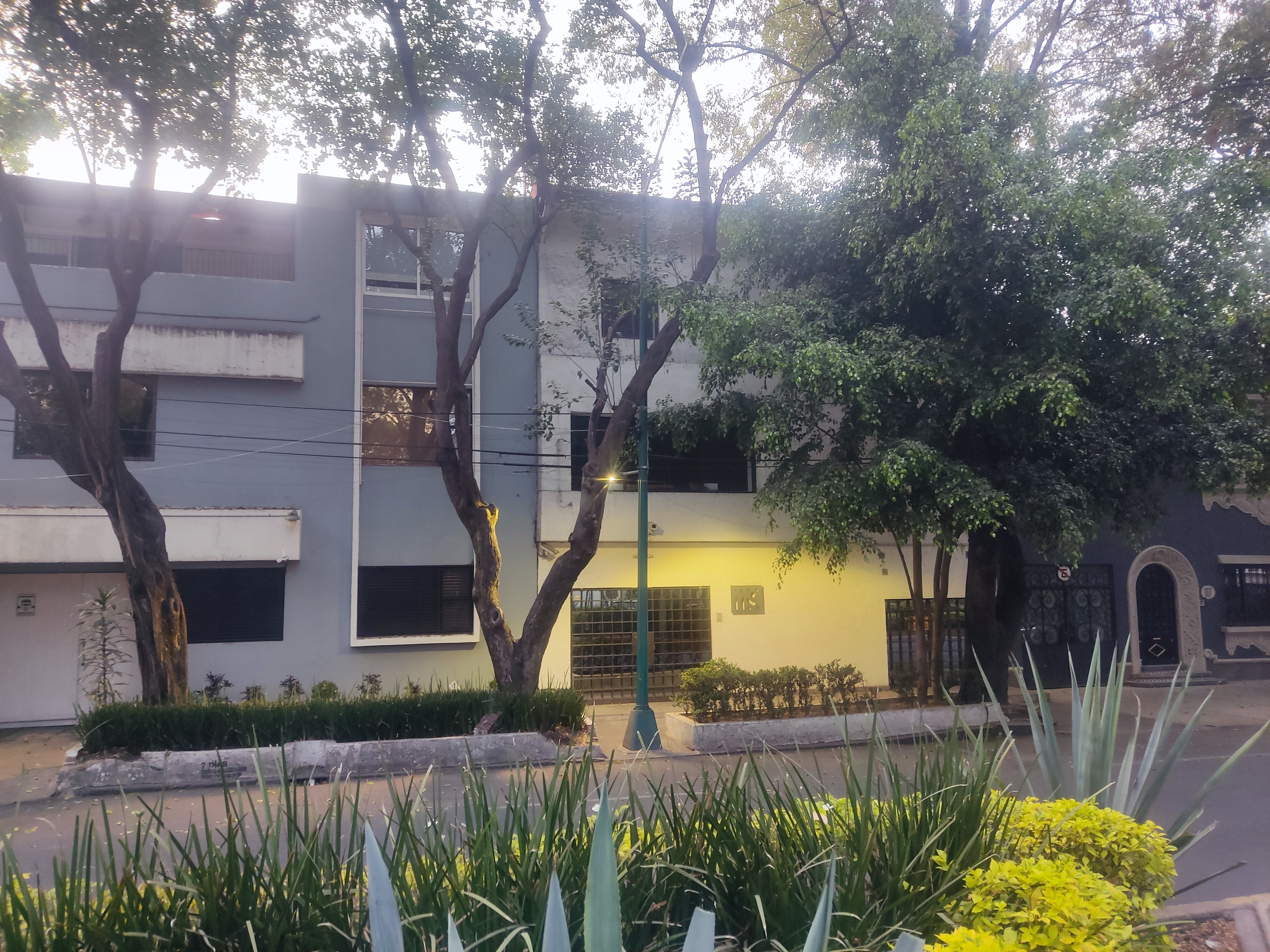
- Director: Héctor Aguilar Camín
- Categories: Culture, Politics
- Frequency: Monthly
- Founded: 1978
- Country: Mexico
- Based in: Colonia Condesa, Cuauhtémoc, Mexico City
- Language: Spanish
- Website: link (in Spanish)
- ISSN: 0188-0144
- OCLC: 647889089

Nexos is a cultural and political magazine based in Mexico City, Mexico.

== History and profile ==
Nexos was founded in 1978. The founders were a group of Intellectuals headed by Héctor Aguilar Camín. The magazine modeled on the New York Review of Books. Since the establishment of the magazine a number of leading intellectuals among its writers and contributors, such as José Woldenberg and Wendy Guerra have edited it. The magazine is published on a monthly basis.

The magazine has socialist political views, and is a representative of the left-wing cultural and literary establishments in the country. It supported militant actions to offer social justice and equality to the poor in the 1980s. However, since the leftist government of Andrés Manuel López Obrador took office in 2018 in Mexico, the director of Nexos, Hector Aguilar Camín, called for a citizen alliance against López Obrador.
