= Héctor Aguilar Camín =

Mexican writer, journalist and historian

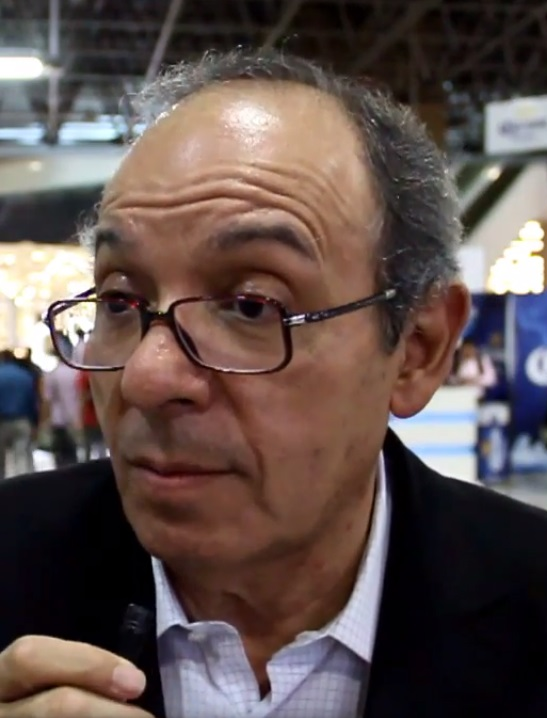
Héctor Aguilar Camín in 2012.

Héctor Aguilar Camín (born July 9, 1946) is a Mexican writer, journalist, and historian, director of Nexos magazine.

Born in Chetumal, Quintana Roo, he was the son of Emma Camín García, an Asturian woman born in Cuba. He is the grandnephew of Alfonso Camín, author of the poem “Macorina,” dedicated to the life of María Calvo Nodarse, which was made famous by the singer Chavela Vargas when it was set to music.

Aguilar Camín graduated from the Ibero-American University with a bachelor's degree in information sciences and received a doctorate's degree in history from El Colegio de México. In 1986 he received Mexico's Cultural Journalism National Award and three years later he received a scholarship from the John Simon Guggenheim Memorial Foundation while working as a researcher for the National Institute of Anthropology and History.

As a journalist, he has written for La Jornada (which he also co-edited), Unomásuno and currently for Milenio. He edited Nexos and hosted Zona abierta, a weekly current-affairs show on national television. He has worked as a researcher at the National Institute of Anthropology and History (INAH) was editorial director of literary magazine Cal y Arena. In 1998 he received the Literature Award for his book Mazatlán: A breath in the river. The jury described him "a brilliant historian". He is remarried to Ángeles Mastretta and has three sons.

== Prizes and recognition ==
- Premio Nacional de Periodismo Cultural 1986, categoría de artículo de fondo
- Beca Guggenheim (1989)
- Medalla al Mérito, estado de Quintana Roo (1992)
- Premio Mazatlán de Literatura 1998 por Un soplo en el río
- Medalla Gabriela Mistral (Chile) (2001)

== Selected books ==
- Toda la vida (2016, novel) ISBN 9786073142595
- Adiós a los padres (2015, novel) ISBN 9786073126892
- Pensando pendientes y otras historias conversadas (2012, short stories) ISBN 9786070710681
- Una agenda para México 2012 (2012, nonfiction) with Jorge G. Castaneda ISBN 978-6071115546
- La modernidad fugitiva (Esta edición incluye dos libros clave del autor: Después del milagro, publicado en 1988, y La ceniza y la semilla, publicado en el año 2000. Añade un ensayo sobre la experiencia de los últimos años: Los límites de la democracia mexicana, 2000-2012) ISBN 978-6070711503
- Regreso al futuro (2011, essays) with Jorge G. Castaneda ISBN 9786071108517
- Informe Jalisco: Más allá de la guerra de las drogas (2010, nonfiction by various authors including Aguilar Camín) ISBN 9786077638766
- Un futuro para México (2010, essays) with Jorge G. Castaneda ISBN 9786071104007
- La invención de México (2010, essays) ISBN 9786077000617
- La tragedia de Colosio (2009, "novela sin ficción") ISBN 9786077000938
- Pensando en la izquierda (2008, essays) ISBN 9789681685614
- La provincia perdida (2007, novel) ISBN 9789703706044
- Pensar en Mexico (2006, essays) ISBN 9789681679835
- La conspiración de la fortuna (2005, novel) ISBN 9788408059011
- Antologia Letras en el Golfo Festival de Literatura 2003 (2003,various authors including Aguilar Camín) ASIN: B00563O2GY
- Mandatos del corazón (2002, novel) ISBN 9789500722568
- Las mujeres de Adriano (2002, novel) ISBN 9788420464336
- México La ceniza y la semilla (2000 3rd edition, nonfiction) ISBN 978-9684933804
- El resplandor de la madera (1999, novel) ISBN 9788420441917
- Un soplo en el río (1997, novel) ISBN 9788420483665
- El error de la luna (1995, novel) ISBN 9789681902612; reprinted 2010, 2013 ISBN 9789681902612
- Diez para los maestros (1993, essays by various authors including Aguilar Camín) ISBN 9789686605068
- Subversiones silenciosas: Ensayos de historia y politica de Mexico (Nuevo siglo) (1993, nonfiction) ISBN 978-9681901813
- A La Sombra De La Revolución Mexicana (1992, nonfiction); reprinted 2010 with Lorenzo Meyer ISBN 978-9687711317
- Historias conversadas (1992, short stories) ISBN 978-9684932432
- La guerra de Galio (1990 novel); reprinted 1994 ISBN 9788420481630; 2010 ISBN 9786079357221
- Despues del Milagro (1989, nonfiction); reprinted 2010 ISBN 978-9687711164
- Historia gráfica de México (1989, with Lorenzo Meyer).
- En Torno a La Cultura Nacional (1989, Editor Aguilar Camín) ISBN 978-9682924972
- Morir en el Golfo (1985, novel); reprinted 2012 ISBN 9786070710674
- México ante la crisis / Volumen 2. El impacto social y cultural. Las alternativas (1985, nonfiction) with Pablo Gonzalez Casanova ISBN 978-9682313455
- México ante la crisis / Volumen 1. El contexto internacional y la crisis economica (1985, nonfiction) with Pablo Gonzalez Casanova ISBN 978-9682313387
- La decadencia del dragon (1985, nonfiction, 2nd ed) ISBN 978-9684930346
- Saldos De La Revolucion: Historia Y Politica De Mexico 1910-1968 (1984, essays) revised 2010 ISBN 978-6070710667
- Los Dias de Manuel Buendia: Testimonios (1984, nonfiction) ISBN 978-9684930636
- Caudillo and Peasant in the Mexican Revolution, coautor; Cambridge University Press, 1980
- Historia: ¿Para qué?, coautor; Siglo XXI, México, 1980
- Con el filtro azul (1979, short stories) ISBN 978-9684341098
- La frontera nómada, Sonora y la Revolucion Mexicana (history, first edition, Siglo XXI, 1977, second edition 1997, Cal y Arena); 1985 ISBN 9789682906879; 2010 ISBN 978-6077638230
- En torno de la cultura nacional, coautor; Instituto Nacional Indigenista, México, 1976
