= Gabriel Zaid =

Mexican writer, poet and intellectual

Gabriel Zaid is a Mexican writer, poet and intellectual.

== Early life ==
He was born in the city of Monterrey, Nuevo León, on January 24, 1934, son of Palestinian immigrants, is a Mexican thinker (poet, essayist, economist, businessman, engineer, anarchist, reader, Catholic, liberal, critical of progress that does not produce) difficult to classify due to its wide variety of knowledge and culture.

He has been recognized, mainly, for his critical essays, which cover topics on politics, culture and the economy of Mexico.

He is considered an independent intellectual, since he publishes on his own and in favor of readers. He has never worked for universities, neither for the government nor political parties.

He studied Engineering at the Tecnológico de Monterrey.

He was a member of the Board of Directors of the Vuelta magazine from 1976 to 1992. He has been a member of El Colegio Nacional since September 26, 1984. He has been a member of the Mexican Academy of Language since 1986. He has distinguished himself for never appearing in public—not even his picture has been taken. This springs from a strongly held opinion that a writer should be known by his work, not his real life personality. His essays have been very influential on a vast array of topics, most significantly poetry, economics, and criticism of the literary establishment.

- Fábula de Narciso y Ariadna (Fable of Narciso and Ariadna) (1958);
- Seguimiento (Following) (1964);
- Campo nudista (Nudist Camp) (1969);
- Lina (1972);
- Práctica mortal (Deadly Practice) (1973);
- Cuestionario (Questionnaire) (1976);
- Canciones de Vidyapati (Songs of Vidyapati) (1978);
- Sonetos y canciones (Sonnets and Songs) (1992);
- Reloj de sol (Sun Clock) (1995).

== Essays on poetry ==
- La poesía, fundamento de la ciudad (Poetry, Foundation of the City) (1963);
- La máquina de cantar (The Singing Machine) (1967);
- Leer poesía (Reading Poetry) (1972 Xavier Villarrutia Award);
- La poesía en la práctica (Poetry in Practice) (1985 Magda Donato Award);
- Un amor imposible de López Velarde (An Impossible Love of López Velarde) (1986);
- Muerte y resurrección de la cultura católica (Death and Resurrection of Catholic Culture) (1992);
- Ensayos sobre poesía (Essays on Poetry) (1993);
- Tres poetas católicos (Three Catholic Poets) (1997).

== Poetry anthologies ==
- Ómnibus de poesía mexicana (Omnibus of Mexican Poems) (1971);
- Asamblea de poetas jóvenes de México (Assembly of Young Mexican Poets) (1980);
- Antología poética de Manuel M. Ponce (Poem Anthology of Manuel M. Ponce) (1980).

== Criticism about the Cultural World ==
- Cómo leer en bicicleta (How to Read on a Bicycle) (1975);
- Problemas de una cultura matriotera (Problems of a Mother-Idolizing Culture) (1982);
- Imprenta y vida pública de Daniel Cosío Villegas (Printing House and Public Life of Daniel Cosío Villegas) (1985);
- ¿Adivinos o libreros? (Fortune Tellers or Book Store Owners) (1986);
- De los libros al poder (From Books to Power) (1988);
- Legítima defensa de la exención autoral que hacen numerosos autores mexicanos con buenas razones y ejemplos desde los tiempos prehispánicos (Legitimate Defense of the Author Exemption made by several Mexican Authors with Good Reasons and Examples since Pre-Hispanic Times) (1993);
- Los demasiados libros (So Many Books) (1996); English translation by Natasha Wimmer in 2003 (Paul Dry Books, Philadelphia).

== Social criticism ==
- El progreso improductivo (The Improductive Progress) (1979);
- La feria del progreso (The Progress Fair) (1982);
- La economía presidencial (The Presidential Economy) (1987);
- La nueva economía presidencial (The New Presidential Economy) (1994);
- Hacen falta empresarios creadores de empresarios (There's a Need of Entrepreneur-creating Entrepreneurs) (1995);
- Adiós al PRI (Farewell to the PRI) (1995).
