= Italian immigration to Mexico =

Mexican citizens of Italian descent

Italian Mexicans
Italo-messicani (Italian) Ítalo-mexicanos (Spanish)
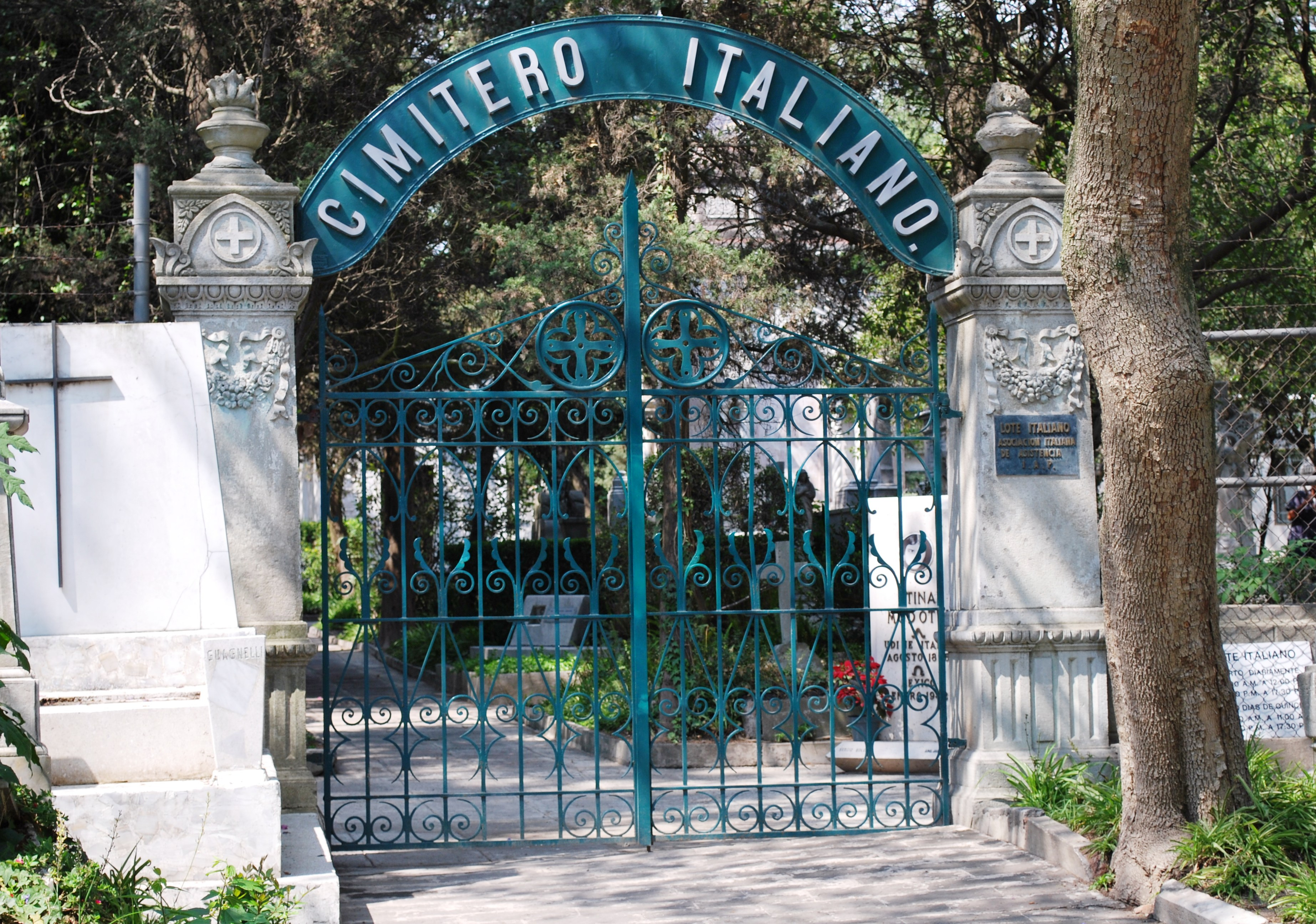
- Entrance to the Italian section of the Panteón de Dolores in Mexico City

Total population
- c. 10,000 (by birth) c. 850,000 (by ancestry)

Regions with significant populations
- Michoacán, Mexico City, Puebla, Nuevo León, Veracruz

Languages
- Mexican Spanish · Italian and Italian dialects · Chipileño

Religion
- Roman Catholicism

Related ethnic groups
- Italians, Italian Americans, Italian Argentines, Italian Bolivians, Italian Brazilians, Italian Canadians, Italian Chileans, Italian Colombians, Italian Costa Ricans, Italian Cubans, Italian Dominicans, Italian Ecuadorians, Italian Guatemalans, Italian Haitians, Italian Hondurans, Italian Panamanians, Italian Paraguayans, Italian Peruvians, Italian Puerto Ricans, Italian Salvadorans, Italian Uruguayans, Italian Venezuelans

Italian Mexicans (Italian: italo-messicani; Spanish: ítalo-mexicanos) are Mexican-born citizens who are fully or partially of Italian descent, whose ancestors were Italians who emigrated to Mexico during the Italian diaspora, or Italian-born people in Mexico. The ancestors of most Mexicans of Italian descent arrived in the country during the late 19th century. Their descendants have generally assimilated into mainstream Mexican society.

== History ==
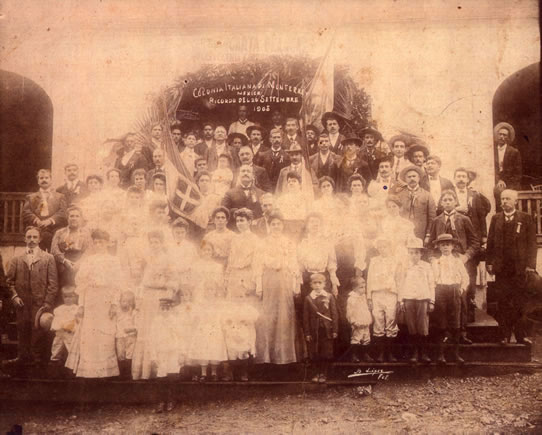
Italian community of Monterrey in 1905

During the colonial era there was a small number of non-Spanish European entrants, in particular Catholic missionaries. There are records of a few Italian soldiers and mariners in early New Spain. Prominent among the Italians was Juan Pablos (born Giovanni Paoli in Brescia), who founded the first printing shop in the Americas. The most important missionary was Eusebio Kino who led the evangelization of Pimería Alta.

Italian-Mexican identity rests on the common experience of migration from Italy in the late 19th century, a period characterized by a general Italian diaspora to the Americas. About 13,000 Italians emigrated to Mexico during this period, and at least half returned to Italy or went on to the United States. Most Italians who came to Mexico were farmers or farm workers from the northern Italian regions of Veneto, Trentino-Alto Adige/Südtirol, and Lombardy. Others, who arrived in the early 20th century, were from southern Italy. Many Italian settlers arriving in the late 19th and early 20th centuries received land grants from the Mexican government. When Benito Mussolini came to power, thousands of Italian families left Italy for Mexico.

The regions with the greatest populations of Mexican Italians are Mexico City, Monterrey, Michoacán, Puebla, Hidalgo and Veracruz. In Michoacán, many Northern Italian immigrants settled, most notably Dante Cusi. His legacy is seen in towns with names like Lombardia, Michoacán and Nueva Italia, Michoacán. In Hidalgo, there are a large number of people of Southern Italian descent. Many of these Italian families in Hidalgo received land grants from the government and Mexican citizenship. They still carry out traditions from their ancestors.

== Society ==
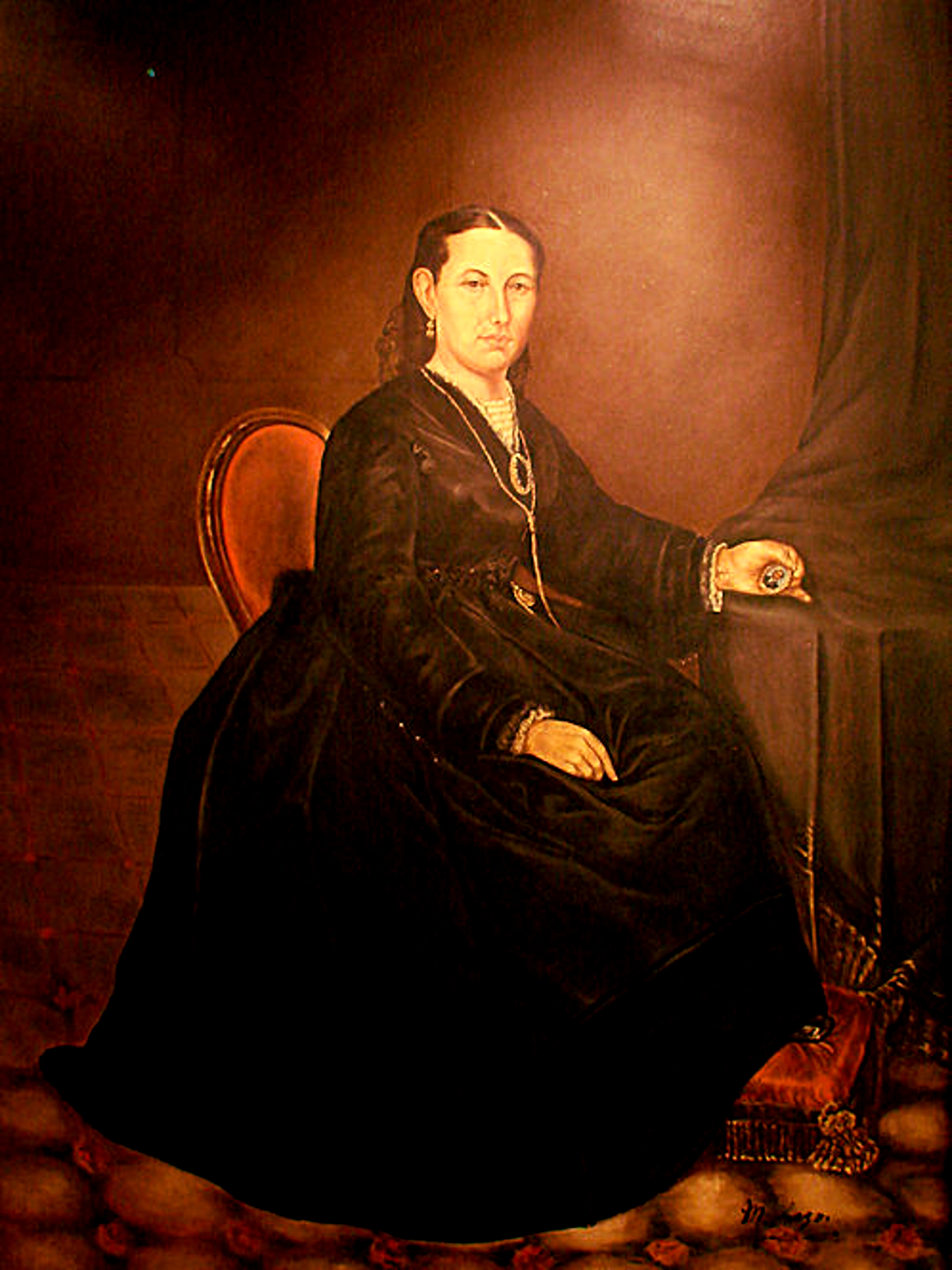
First Lady Margarita Maza, wife of Benito Juárez, was the daughter of a Genoese immigrant.

Although Italian-Mexicans claim an Italian ethnic identity, they generally note that they are Mexican as well. There were an estimated 850,000 Mexicans descended from Italian colonists. Population figures are uncertain because, unlike other countries, Mexico's census does not gather information on specific ethnic groups. Most Italian Mexicans speak Spanish, but in Italian communities Italian and its related languages and dialects (usually mixed with Spanish) are used to communicate among themselves.

== Italian community ==
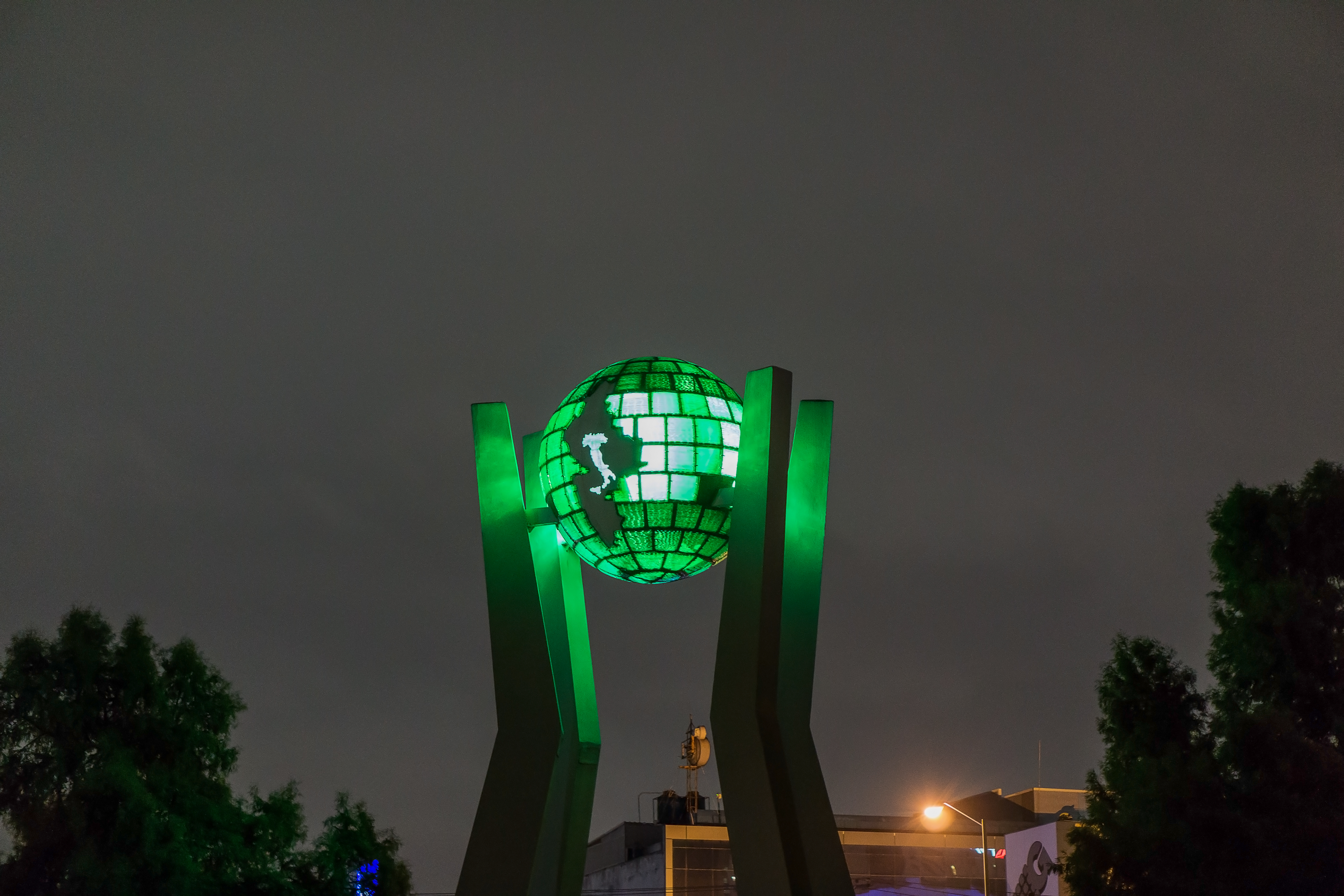
Monument in San Pedro Garza García commemorating the Italian presence in Nuevo León

Many Italian-Mexicans live in cities founded by their ancestors in the states of Veracruz (Huatusco), Michoacán, and San Luis Potosí. Smaller numbers of Italian-Mexicans live in Guanajuato and the State of Mexico, and the former haciendas (now cities) of Nueva Italia, Michoacán and Lombardia, Michoacán, both founded by Dante Cusi from Gambar in Brescia.

Playa del Carmen, Mahahual and Cancun in the state of Quintana Roo have also received a significant number of immigrants from Italy. Several families of Italian-Mexican descent were granted citizenship in the United States under the Bracero program to address a labor shortage.

Italian companies have invested in Mexico, primarily in the tourism and hospitality industries. These ventures have sometimes resulted in settlements, but residents primarily live in the resort areas of the Riviera Maya, Baja California, Puerto Vallarta and Cancun. Although they generate employment, mainly in restaurants, hotels and entertainment centers, most employees have not become permanent residents of Mexico and live as ex-pats.

There were over 850,000 Mexicans of Italian descent, while there were around 10,000 Italian citizens.

== Italian culture in Mexico ==
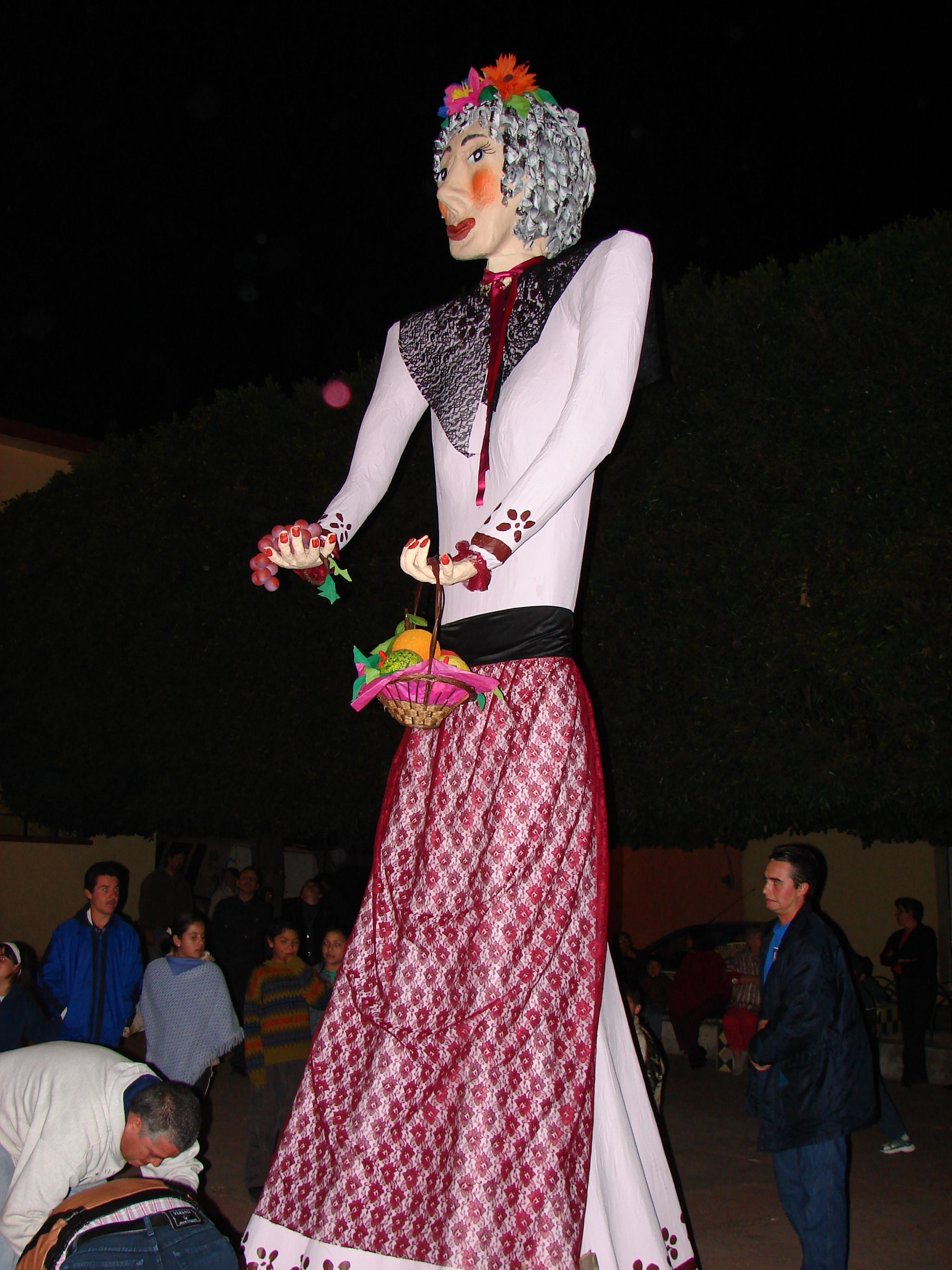
Italian feast of Befana in Chipilo, Puebla

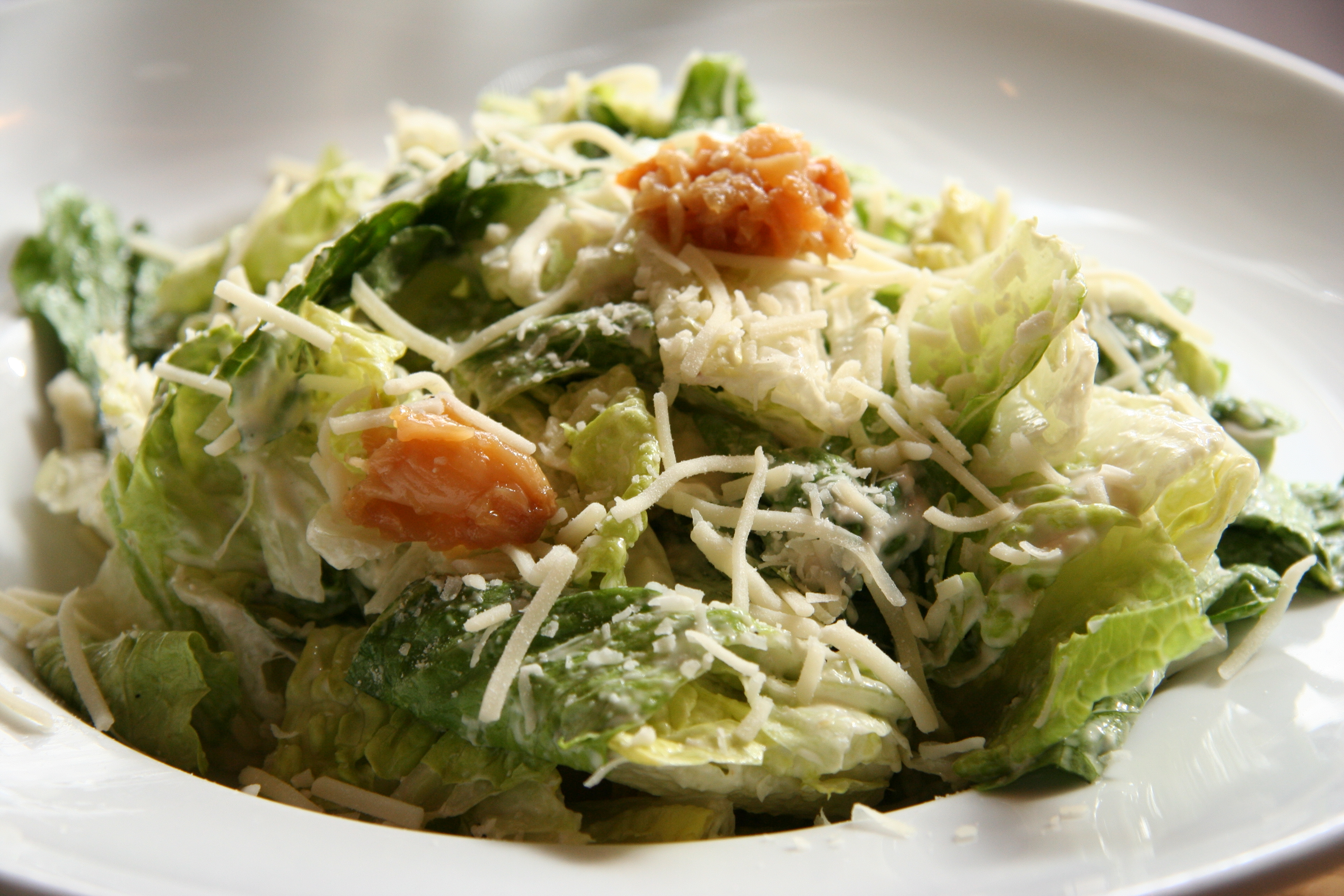
Caesar salad is part of Baja California gastronomy but originates in Italian cuisine

The Befana is a feast that comes from Veneto, a region in northern Italy. This is one of the best-known festivals in Mexico, even though there are other typical Italian traditions that have spread among the Chipileños such as bowling, some songs and various traditions practiced by children.

Eduardo Montagner Anguiano is a Mexican writer born in Chipilo, in the state of Puebla. He writes in Venetian and, precisely, in the Chipile variant. His literary works are part of Mexican literature of the 21st century and maintain the unique identity of the town of Chipilo. Eduardo Montagner Anguiano has a degree in Linguistics and has been a staunch defender of the minority languages of Mexico (focusing, in particular, on the Chipileño variant).

As far as Mexican cuisine is concerned, there are many food contributions that have been brought by Italian immigrants. Caesar salad, for example, is part of Baja California gastronomy but originates in Italian cuisine. The salad's creation is generally attributed to the restaurateur Caesar Cardini, an Italian immigrant who operated restaurants in Mexico and the United States. Wines are also of significant importance in the cuisine of Baja California and, in Valle de Guadalupe, the Italian Mexican Cetto family promoted the wine industry together with other entrepreneurs.

The craft of the Mexican piñata has its origins in Italy, due to the historical connection that arose in the old world between Italy and other nations. In Mexico, the tradition of breaking piñatas was initially limited to the holiday season, but then spread to children's birthdays as well. Piñatas are part of a fusion of traditions from various regions of the world. In fact, the custom arose in China and reached Italy through Marco Polo, then it was spread by the Italian friars who brought it to New Spain, where it took root and acquired a Christian particularity with Aztec roots. Today it is part of the most common customs in Mexico.

== Italian dialects ==
Areas where Chipilo Venetian dialect is spoken in Puebla state

Most Italian immigration to Mexico occurred in the establishment of colonies. Dialects of Italian and languages of Italy which are still spoken include:

- Lower Bellunese, a dialect of the Venetian language from the Province of Belluno in Colonia Diez Gutierrez in San Luis Potosí
- Chipilo Venetian, a dialect of the Venetian language, as spoken in the province of Treviso, currently spoken in the city of Chipilo, Puebla
- Lombard in Sinaloa, Colonia Manuel González, Nueva Italia and Colonia Lombardia in the state of Michoacán
- Trentino dialects of Lombard and Venetian in Colonia Manuel González, Veracruz and Tijuana, Baja California
- Piedmontese in Gutierrez Zamora, Veracruz (the oldest Italian colony in Mexico) and La Estanzuela, Jalisco, another Italian colony
- Sicilian, primarily in Mexico City, Reynosa and Monterrey

== Notable Italian-Mexicans ==
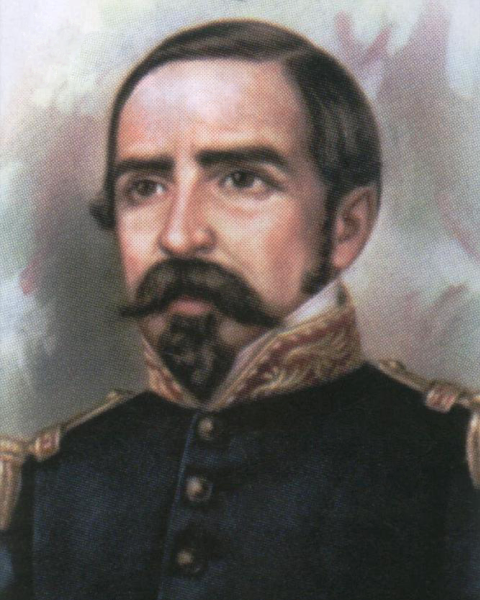
Manuel María Lombardini, President of Mexico in 1853.

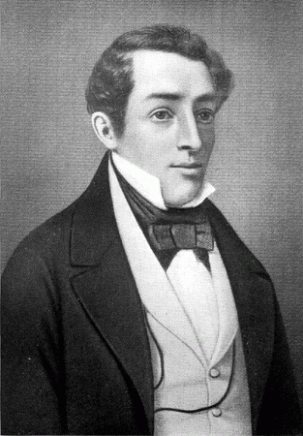
Claudio Linati is known for his lithographs depicting life in early independent Mexico.

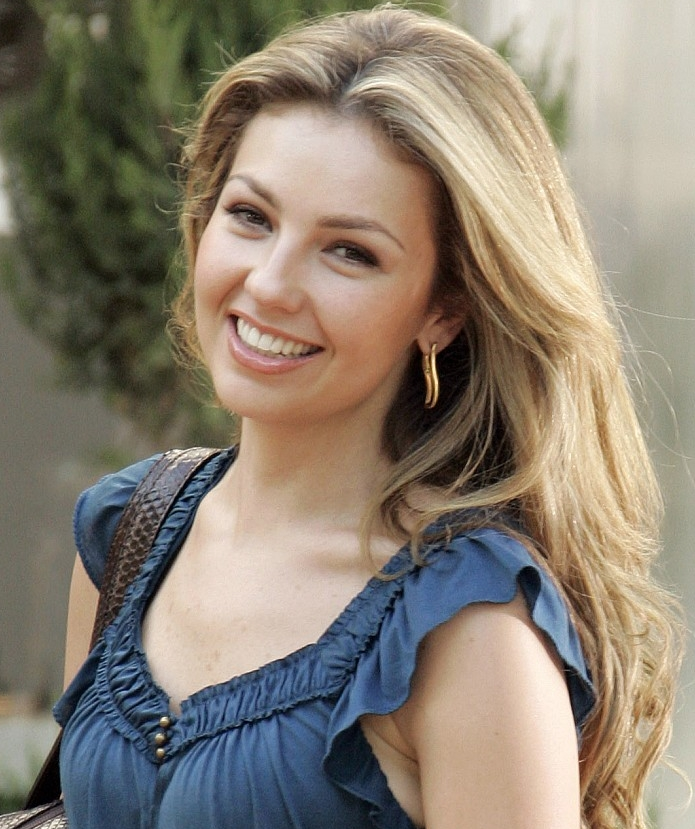
Thalía. Her father's paternal grandfather was born in Florence, Italy.

- Marcelo Andreani, wrestler
- Rosángela Balbó, actress
- Katie Barberi, actress
- Óscar Bonfiglio, footballer
- Éder Borelli, footballer
- Jared Borgetti, footballer
- Tomás Boy, footballer and manager
- Caesar Cardini, restaurateur, chef, and hotel owner
- Horacio Carochi, priest and grammarian
- Arturo Brizio Carter, football referee
- Cassiano Conzatti, botanist
- Aldo de Nigris, footballer
- Alfonso de Nigris, actor and influencer
- Antonio de Nigris, footballer
- Raúl Allegre, american football player
- David Toscana, writer
- Alberto Del Rio, wrestler
- Adolfo Dollero, historian
- Walter Erviti, footballer
- Eugenio Pizzuto, footballer
- Isidro Fabela, judge, politician, professor, writer, publisher, governor of the State of Mexico, diplomat, and delegate to the now defunct League of Nations.
- Vicente Filísola, military and politician
- Pedro Friedeberg, artist and designer born in Florence to a German-Jewish family.
- Francesca Gargallo, writer
- Luis Ghilardi, general
- Filippa Giordano, singer
- Guillermo González Calderoni, commander of the Mexican Federal Judicial Police, and one of the strongmen of the Attorney General of Mexico
- Eusebio Kino, missionary
- Claudio Linati, artist
- Manuel María Lombardini, President of Mexico in 1853
- Teoberto Maler, explorer
- Tina Modotti, photographer
- Nicky Mondellini, actress
- Sasha Montenegro, actress
- Aldo Monti, actor
- Fabio Morábito, writer and poet
- Mario Pani, architect and urbanist
- Carlos Panini, businessman
- Giovanni Paoli, printer
- Pío Pico, politician, ranchero, and entrepreneur, famous for serving as the last governor of Alta California under Mexican rule
- Eugenio Pizzuto, footballer
- Michael Ronda, actor and singer
- Alejandro Rossi, writer
- Martha Roth, actress
- Laurette Séjourné, archeologist
- Camila Sodi, singer, actress and model
- Luciano Spano, painter
- Fabrizio Tavano, footballer
- Thalía, singer and actress
- Gutierre Tibón, writer
- Rodolfo Neri Vela, scientist and astronaut
- Uberto Zanolli, composer
- Salvador Zerboni, actor

== See also ==
- Immigration to Mexico
- Italy–Mexico relations
