= Premio de Traducción Literaria Tomás Segovia =

- Sponsored by: National Council for Culture and Arts; Fondo de Cultura Economica
- Country: Mexico
- Hosted by: Guadalajara International Book Fair
- First award: 2012
- Website: Website

Premio de Traducción Literaria Tomás Segovia was a Mexican literary award given to translators. The honorarium included a cash prize of US$100,000, which made it one of the richest literary prizes in the world. The award was going to alternate every year between translators who translate into Spanish, and those translating from Spanish. It was named in honor of Spanish-born Mexican author, translator and poet Tomas Segovia (1927–2011).

The award was established in 2012 by the National Council for Culture and Arts (Conaculta), a Mexican government agency responsible for promoting the arts. It was financed by Conaculta in partnership with Fondo de Cultura Economica (Mexico's leading publisher) and the Guadalajara International Book Fair, where the award will be presented. The prize, however, was only awarded once in its history.

== Recipients and current status ==
The sole recipient of the award was the Mexican translator Selma Ancira in 2012. Ancira was recognized for her distinguished career in literary translation, specifically for her work translating from Russian into Spanish. The jury for the 2012 edition included Daniel Divinsky (President), Cecilia García-Huidobro, Felipe Garrido, Fabio Morábito, and Angelina Muñiz-Huberman. Despite the initial plan for it to be an annual prize, the competition was never repeated after the 2012 edition.
