= Count of Rodoretto =

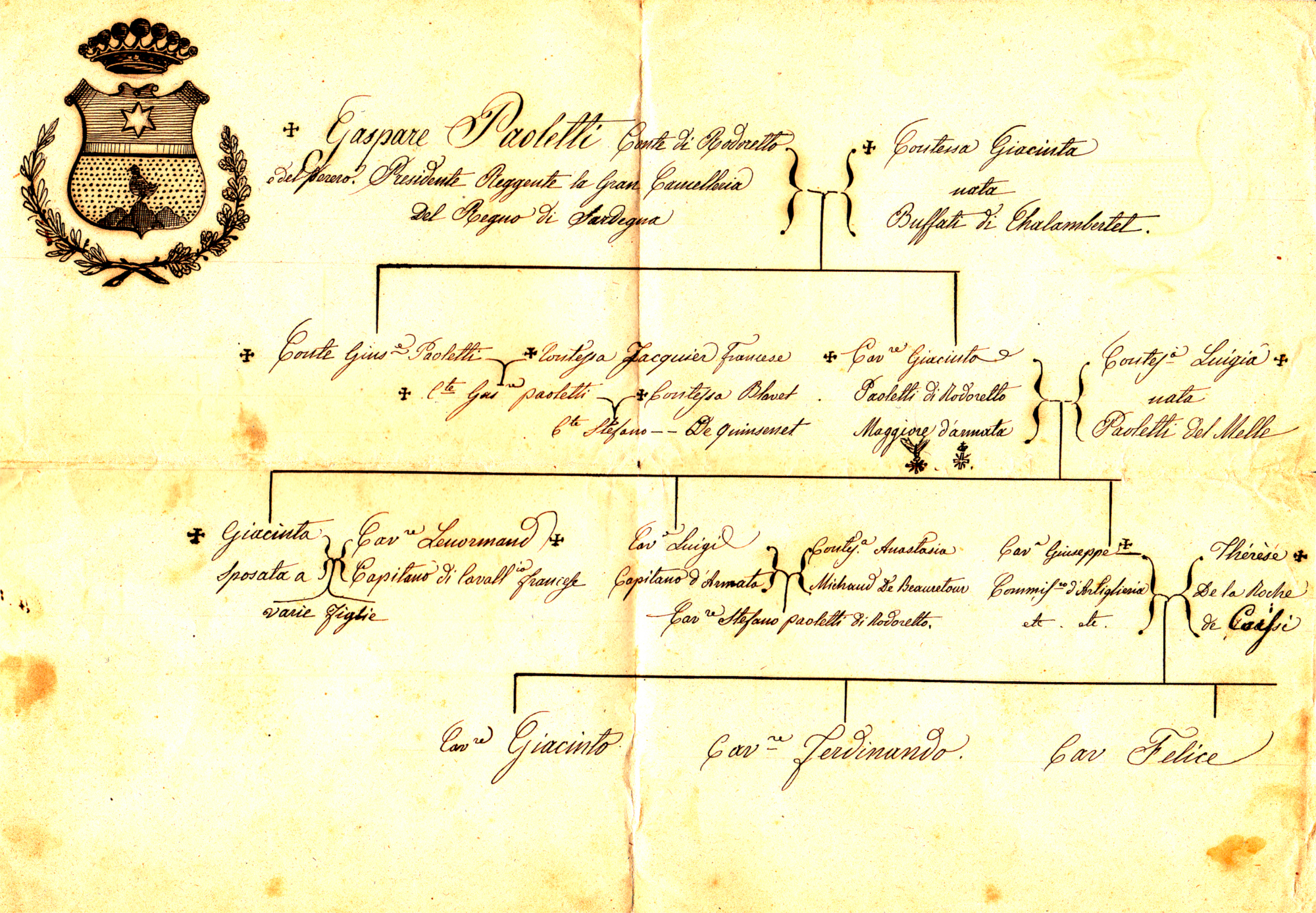
This is a hand-drawn Family tree by Jacinto Paoletti. It depicts the lineage of the Count of Rodoretto and the family crest.

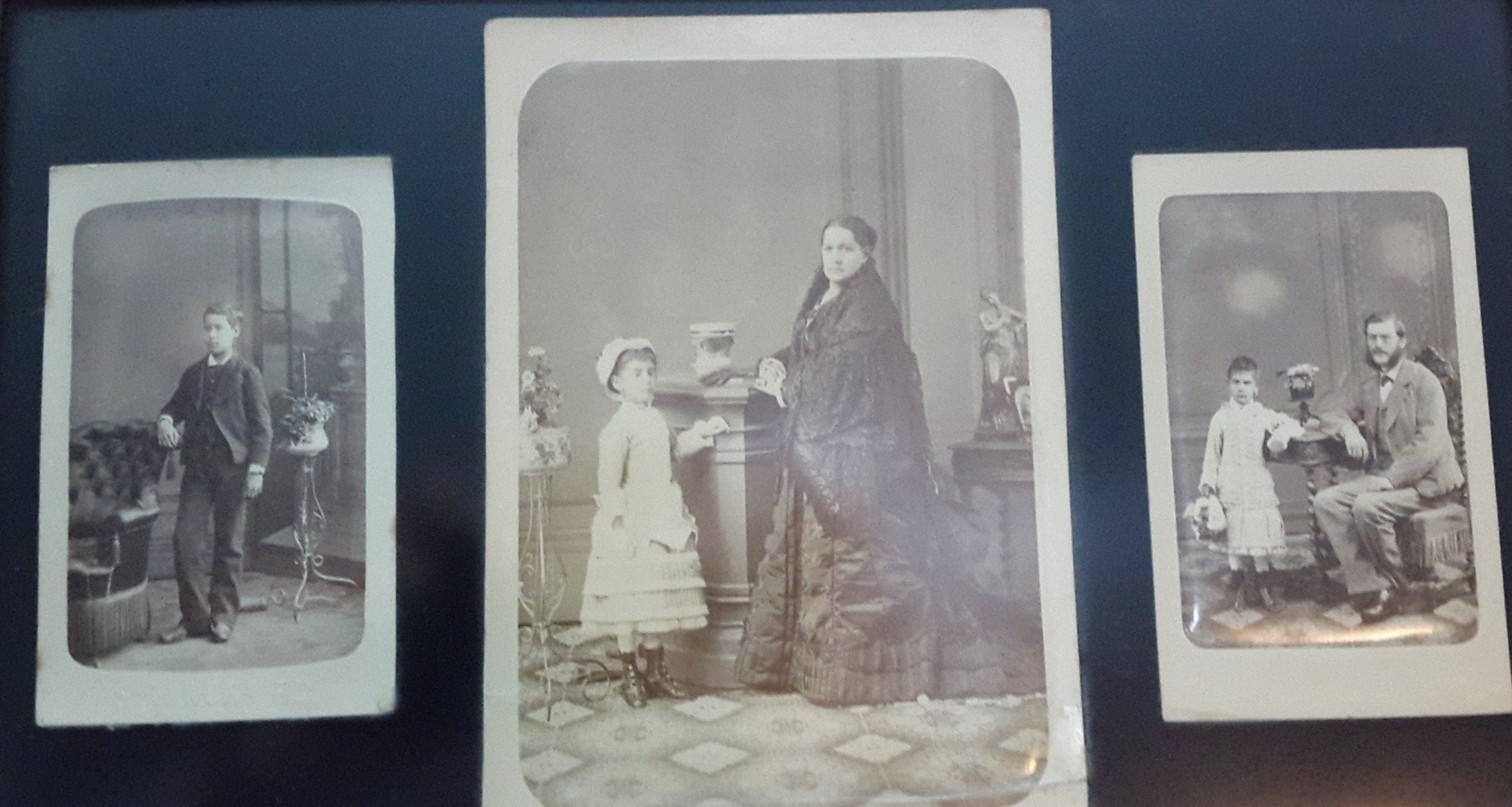
Family Portrait of Jacinto Paoletti with his daughter, Maria Luisa Paoletti (Left); Patricia Güell (Jacinto's wife) with Maria Luisa Paoletti (Center); and Jose Paoletti son of Jacinto (Right)

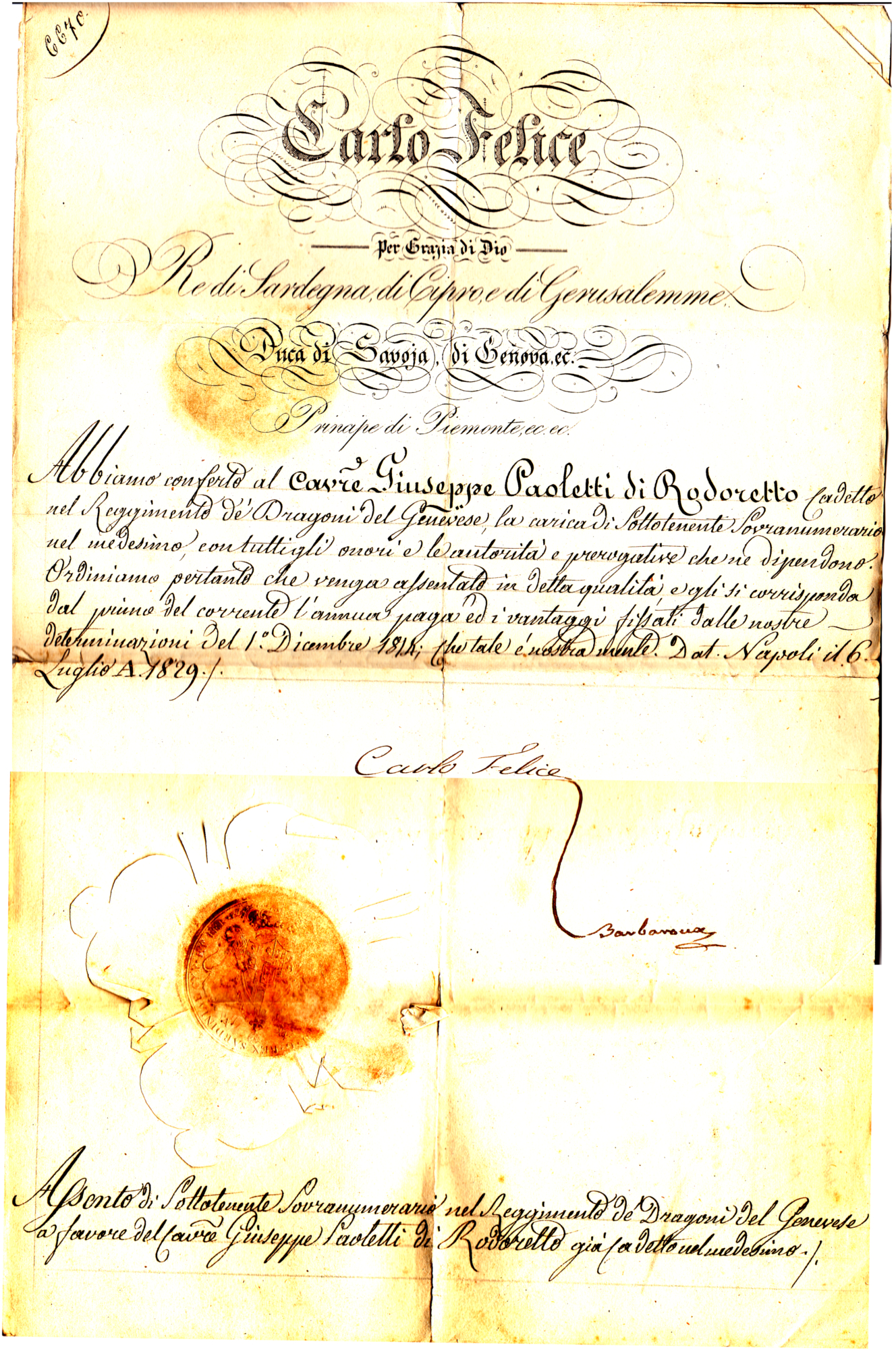
A count title for Giuseppe Paoletti from the king of Italy Charles Felix of Sardinia

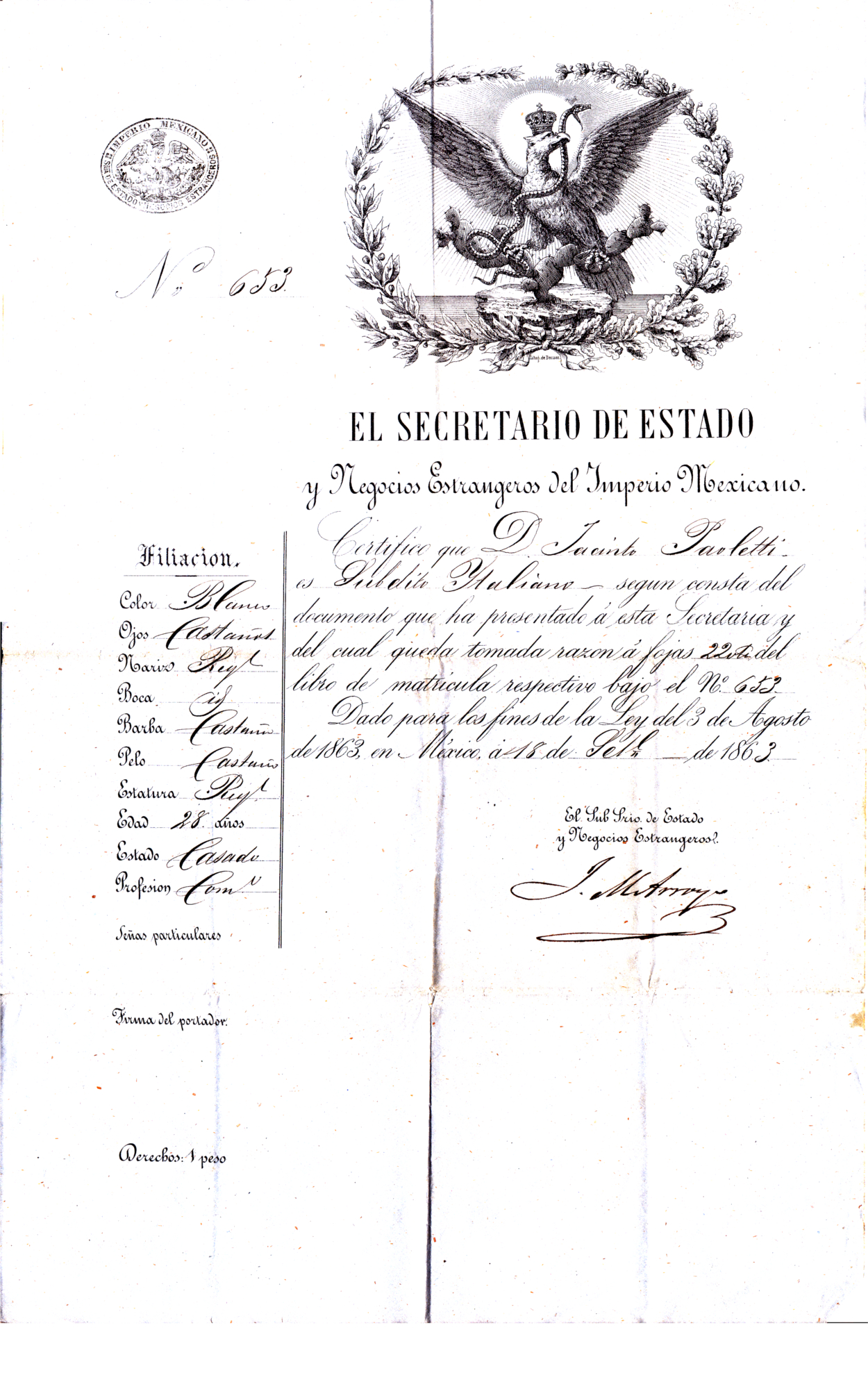
This document places the Paoletti Family in the Mexican Empire, Historically

== History ==
=== Beginning of the Lineage ===
The village of Rodoretto is a small village in the Region of Piedmont, Italy which still exists today^{[1]}. At some point in its history, Gaspare Paoletti di Rodoretto was made Count, presumably due to his military proficiency. The Count of Rodoretto lineage begins with the aforementioned Gaspare Paoletti Conte di Rodoretto dell Perero Presidente Reggente de la Gran Camelleria del Regno di Serdegna^{[4]} sometime before 1800s. Afterwards it continues to Giacinto Paoletti di Rodoretto Maggiore d'amanta. Then Giuseppe Paoletti. Next is Jacinto (Written as Giacinto in the family tree) Paoletti who was the father of Maria Luisa Paoletti who was the last Countess of Rodoretto.

At some point in the lineage, most likely around the 1860s, the family moved out of the Kingdom of Italy into the Mexican empire, José was born on 11 July 1864, where Maria Luisa was born on June 21, 1874.^{[2]}^{[3]}

=== End of the Lineage ===
Jacinto Paoletti decided to leave every possession and title to Maria Luisa Paoletti due to the life-style choices of his son, Jose Paoletti who pursued a career in opera and arts while Maria Luisa studied languages and piano. However, after Maria Luisa Paoletti married Adolfo Dollero, they travelled to Europe where Adolfo cheated on the Countess with his secretary and took all of Maria Luisa's possessions and titles and left her stranded in France. After several years of maintaining herself with piano lessons, her family managed to help her return to Mexico. Several years later and after spending everything and falling ill, Dollero returned to Maria Luisa. Both died in Mexico.
