= The Dinosaur (short story) =

Flash fiction by Augusto Monterroso

- Short story by Augusto Monterroso
- Original title: El Dinosaurio
- Country: Guatemala
- Language: Spanish
- Genre: Short story

Publication
- Published in: Obras completas (Y otros cuentos)
- Media type: Print (Hardcover)
- Publication date: 1959

El dinosaurio (The dinosaur) is a flash fiction written by the Honduras-born Guatemalan writer Augusto Monterroso, published as a part of the book Obras completas (y otros cuentos), in 1959. It is considered one of the shortest stories in Spanish, and its whole text is the following:

Cuando despertó, el dinosaurio todavía estaba allí.

Meaning: When he/she/it woke, the dinosaur was still there.

It is a simple sentence that forms a flash story, probably the most famous of all those published by Monterroso throughout his career. It was considered the shortest short story in the Spanish language until the publication of another three works during the 21st century: one in 2005, El emigrante, by Luis Felipe Lomelí; other, in 2006, Luis XIV, by Juan Pedro Aparicio, and one in 2015, Epitafio para un microrrelatista, by Marcelo Gobbo.

== Impact in Mexican popular culture ==
In the history of Mexico, the Institutional Revolutionary Party remained in power for more than seven decades. It was compared to a "Dinosaur" by commentators due to the length of its time in power; as such, the El dinosaurio poem was often used to mock them.

== Bibliography ==
- Varios (2009). Cuentos breves para leer en la cama [Short stories to read in bed.] (in Spanish). Madrid: Santillana Ediciones Generales SL. ISBN 978-84-663-2340-6.
