= Tomás Segovia (poet) =

Mexican author, translator and poet

Tomás Segovia (Spanish pronunciation: [toˈmas seˈɣoβja]; 21 May 1927 – 7 November 2011) was a Mexican author, translator and poet of Spanish origin. He was born in Valencia, Spain, and studied in France and Morocco. He went into exile to Mexico, where he taught at the Colegio de México and other universities. Segovia founded the publication Presencia (1946), was director of La Revista Mexicana de Literatura (1958–1963), formed part of the magazine Plural, and collaborated in Vuelta. He was married to the writer Inés Arredondo from 1953 to 1965.

At the time of his death he resided in Madrid, Spain.

== Works ==
His work as a poet is not separate from his literary criticism and works of translation. Notable books of poetry include La luz provisional (1950), El sol y su eco (1960), Anagnórisis (1967), Figura y secuencias (1979) and Cantata a solas (1985). Prose works include: Contracorrientes (1973), Poética y profética (1986) and Alegatorio.

== Awards ==
Segovia won the Xavier Villaurrutia Prize in 1972, the Juan Rulfo Prize in 2005, and the García Lorca International Poetry Prize in 2008.

In honour of the poet, in August 2012, the National Council for Culture and Arts (Conaculta) announced the US$ 100,000 Tomás Segovia Literary Translation Prize, to be awarded in alternating years for the best translation into Spanish or from Spanish.

== Films ==
- La primera segunda matriz (1972). Mexican filmmaker Alfredo Gurrola made this critically acclaimed short film based on Segovia's poem of the same name. The film includes narration by Juan José Gurrola, images of the Avándaro festival and music by avant-garde composers Ligeti, Stockhausen, Luigi Nono among others.
