= Isabel Fraire =

Mexican writer, poet, translator and literary critic (1934–2015)

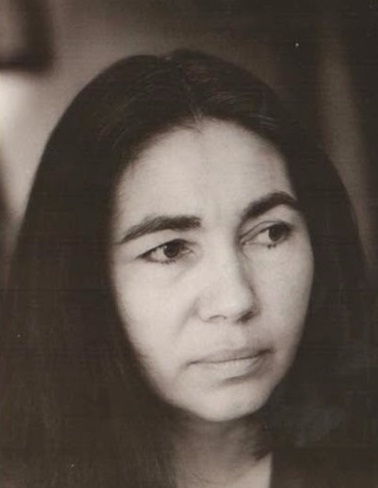
Isabel Fraire

Isabel Fraire (December 8, 1931 – April 5, 2015), also known as Isabel Fraire Benson, was a Mexican writer, poet, translator and literary critic. She was one of the prominent members of her generation of literary figures in Mexico.

== Biography ==
Born on December 8, 1931, in Mexico City, Mexico, of an American mother and a Mexican father, Isabel Fraire studied philosophy and letters at the National Autonomous University of Mexico, where she later became a professor of Literature. She served as a member of the editorial board of the Revista Mexicana de Literatura.

The book named Only This Light, published in 1969 is considered to be her first book of poems, though her earliest poems appeared in 1959 as 15 Poems of Isabel Fraire. Her poems were highly “celebrated for its exquisite images of natural beauty.”

As a bilingual since her childhood, she translated the works of a number of well-known literary critics including Ezra Pound, T. S. Eliot, Wallace Stevens, E. E. Cummings, William Carlos Williams and W. H. Auden.

Her translations from English to Spanish on the literary works of renowned scholars appeared in many popular Latin American journals and anthologies. She also extensively wrote critical essays about Latin American art and literature.

She was the recipient of the Guggenheim Fellowship awarded in 1973. In 1978, she also received the Xavier Villaurrutia Award for her third collection of poetry, Poems in the Lap of Death (1977).

She was 84 years old when she died in Mexico City, Mexico, on April 5, 2015.

== Works ==
=== Poetry ===
- 15 poemas (1959)
- Sólo esta luz (1969)
- Isabel Fraire, poems (1975)
- Poemas en el regazo de la muerte (1977)
- Un poema de navidad para Alaíde Foppa (1982)
- Puente colgante. Poesía reunida (1997)
- Kaleidoscopio insomne. Poesía reunida (2004)
