= Bárbara Jacobs =

Mexican writer, poet, essayist and translator

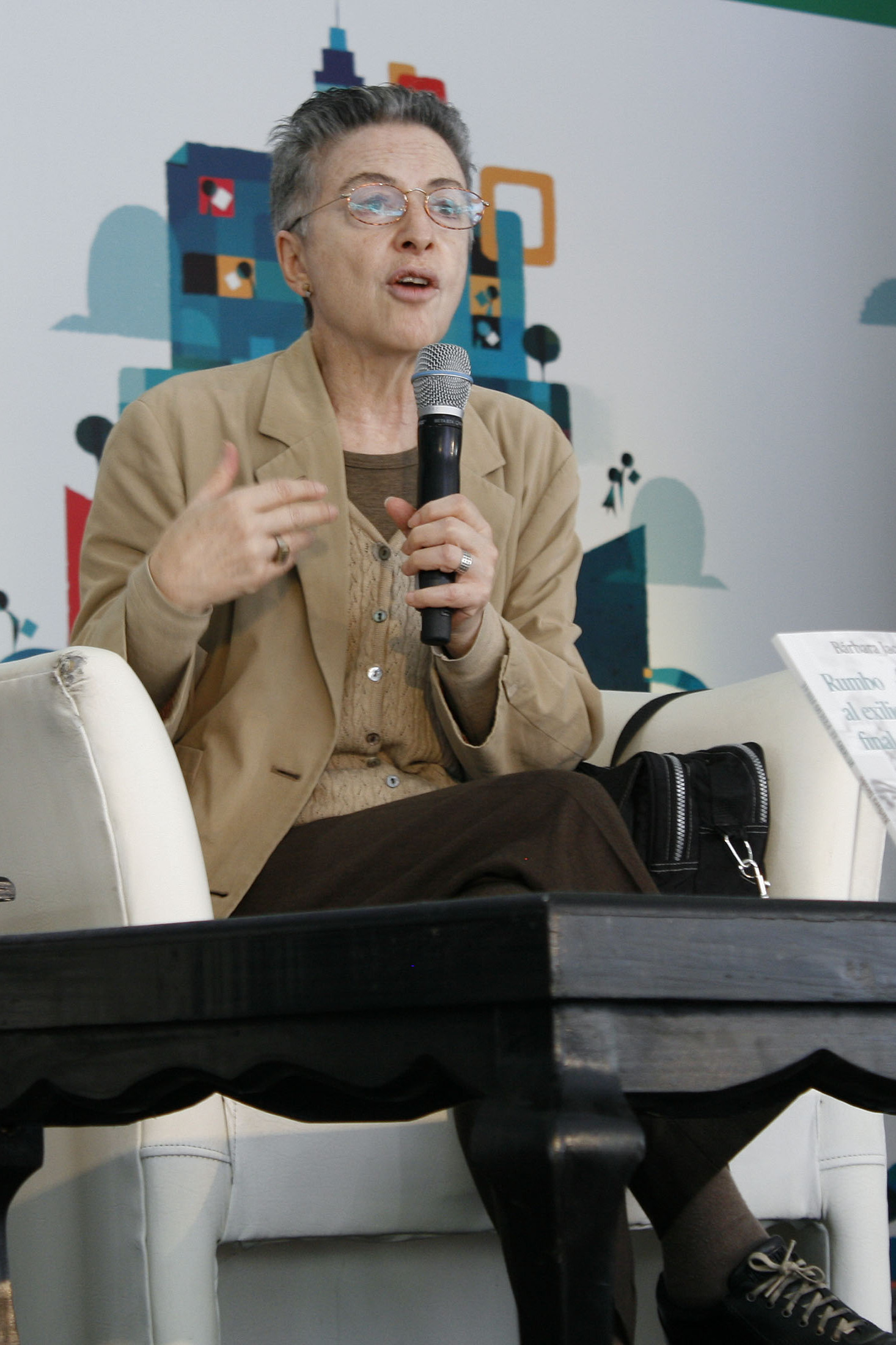
- Born: 19 October 1947 (age 78); Mexico City, Mexico
- Occupation: Writer
- Spouse: Augusto Monterroso
- Writing career
- Language: Spanish
- Notable awards: Xavier Villaurrutia Award

Bárbara Jacobs (born 19 October 1947) is a Mexican writer, poet, essayist and translator.

== Biography ==
Born in Mexico City in 1947, Jacobs grew up in a home where five languages were spoken. Her grandparents were Lebanese Jewish and Lebanese Maronites. After attending school in Montreal, Quebec, Canada, she returned to Mexico and received a degree in psychology from the National Autonomous University of Mexico.

From 1974 to 1977, Jacobs taught and conducted research at the College of Mexico. Beginning in 1970, Jacobs has published stories and essays in literary magazines and supplements. Her novel, Las hojas muertas (Dead leaves; 1987), received the Xavier Villaurrutia Award, and has been translated into English, Italian and Portuguese. It was also a selection of the Secretariat of Public Education. Some of Jacobs' works have been published in collective anthologies in Castilian, English, French, Italian and German. Her books have been published in Mexico, US, Spain, Portugal, Argentina and Italy.

Jacobs was married to the writer Augusto Monterroso (died 2003), who was the Prince of Asturias Award for Literature laureate in 2000. She donated his work to the University of Oviedo.

== Awards and honours ==
- 1987, Xavier Villaurrutia Award
- 1992–93, Scholarship, National Foundation for Culture and Arts (Mexico)
- 1993, AT&T Fellow, International Writing Program, University of Iowa

== Selected works ==
=== Stories ===
- Un justo acuerdo, La Máquina de Escribir, 1979
- Doce cuentos en contra, Martín Casillas, 1982, ISBN 9789703508051

=== Novels ===
- Las hojas muertas, Era, 1987; Las hojas muertas. Ediciones Era. 6 November 2014. ISBN 978-607-445-292-1.<
  - The Dead Leaves, Curbstone Press, 1993, ISBN 9781880684085
- Las siete fugas de Saab, alias el Rizos, Alfaguara / CONCAULTA, Botella al Mar, 1992, ISBN 9789681904425
- Vida con mi amigo, Alfaguara, Madrid, 1994, ISBN 9788420481586
- Adiós humanidad, Alfaguara, 2000. ISBN 9789681906931
- Florencia y ruiseñor, Alfaguara 2006. ISBN 9789707704633
- Lunas. Ediciones Era. 15 June 2010. ISBN 978-607-445-093-4.

=== Essays ===
- Escrito en el tiempo, Era, 1985, ISBN 9789684111332
- Juego limpio (ensayos y apostillas), Alfaguara, 1997, ISBN 9789681903213
- Dos libros, Alfaguara, 2000, ISBN 9788420441825
- Atormentados, Alfaguara, 2002

=== Anthologies ===
- Bárbara Jacobs (2000). Carol dice y otros textos. UNAM. ISBN 978-968-36-8031-0.
