= Lisa Block de Behar =

Uruguayan linguist

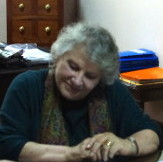
Image of Lisa Block de Behar

Lisa Block de Behar (Montevideo, Uruguay) is a Uruguayan linguist, professor, and researcher in literary theory, comparative literature, and communication media.

== Education and career ==
De Behar was born in Montevido in 1937, graduating from its Instituto de Profesores Artigas in 1960 before going on to her PhD at the École des hautes études en sciences sociales in Paris. She taught at the Instituto de Profesores Artigas from 1972 to 1990, before becoming a professor of the University of the Republic (Universidad de la Republica) in 1985. She is currently at its Instituto de Ciencias de la Comunicacion. She formerly taught Linguistics and Literary Theory at the Instituto de Profesores Artigas (IPA).

After graduation, her dissertation titled Una retórica del silencio was published in Spanish in Mexico, and won the Xavier Villaurrutia Award in 1984. As a visiting professor, she has lectured on semiotics, linguistics, literary theory, comparative literature, and hermeneutics at universities across North America, Europe, Latin America, and Israel. She has been twice awarded a Fulbright Commission scholarship, and has been a fellow of the John Simon Guggenheim Memorial Foundation and the Institute for Advanced Studies at Bloomington University, Indiana.

=== Research ===
Her most recent research is concerned with the poetics of disappearance in relation to space and writing, a rhetoric of discursive negativity and how hermeneutics imagines literality. She observes the transformation of the connection between showing and telling and the uncertainties that technology introduces in literary discourse and daily communication. The incidences of Jewish culture and thought are very present in Block de Behar's research.

She is the author and editor of books on Louis Auguste Blanqui's cosmological phantasmagoria as well as on Jorge Luis Borges, Adolfo Bioy Casares, Haroldo de Campos, Felisberto Hernández, Jules Laforgue, Carlos Real de Azúa and Emir Rodríguez Monegal.

In 2002 she received the Humboldt Research Award from the Alexander von Humboldt Foundation, and in 2011 she was nominated emeritus Professor of Spanish at the Instituto de Profesores Artigas in Uruguay where she had formerly studied.

In 2017 she was awarded the title of Doctor Honoris Causa by the Universidad de la República, Uruguay.

The Ministry of Education and Culture of Uruguay awarded her the Delmira Agustini medal in 2021[3] and in 2022 she received a medal from the French Senate.[4] In 2025 she received the degree of Chevalière de l'ordre des Arts et des Lettres de la République française.

=== Digital Libraries ===
With the collaboration of colleagues and graduate students, she is developing various digital libraries at the site Anaforas:

- Biblioteca digital de autores uruguayos
- Publicaciones periódicas del Uruguay
- Figuras

== Bibliography ==
- Derroteros literarios. Temas y autores que se cruzan en tierras del Uruguay. Universidad de la República/CSIC, Montevideo, 2015
- Borges, The Passion of an Endless Quotation. SUNY Press. Second Edition, New York, 2014
- Borges, Bioy, Blanqui y las leyendas del nombre. Siglo XXI Editores, México, 2011
- Medios, pantallas y otros lugares comunes. Sobre cambios e intercambios verbales y visuales en tiempos mediáticos, Katz, Buenos Aires, 2009
- Adriana Contreras. Fragmentos de obra (en colaboración con Haroldo de Campos), Albedrío, México, 2001
- Borges. La pasión de una cita sin fin, Siglo XXI Editores, México, 1999. Trad. inglesa: Borges. The passion of an endless quotation, SUNY Press, New York, 2002
- Borges ou les gestes d'un voyant aveugle, Champion, París, 1998
- Una palabra propiamente dicha, Siglo XXI Editores, México y Buenos Aires, 1994
- Dos medios entre dos medios. Sobre la representación y sus dualidades, Siglo XXI Editores, México y Buenos Aires, 1990
- Jules Laforgue o las metáforas del desplazamiento, Montevideo, 1987. Trad. francesa: Jules Laforgue. Les métaphores du déplacement, L'Harmattan, París, 2004
- Al margen de Borges, Siglo XXI Editores. Buenos Aires y México, 1987. Trad. italiana: Al margine di Borges, Edizioni dal Sud, Bari, 1997
- Una retórica del silencio. Funciones del lector y procedimientos de la lectura literaria, Siglo XXI Editores, México, 1984. Trad. inglesa: A rhetoric of silence and other selected writings, Mouton De Gruyter, Berlín, 1995
- El lenguaje de la publicidad, Siglo XXI Editores, México y Buenos Aires, 1973
- Análisis de un lenguaje en crisis. Recursos del humor verbal en la narrativa latinoamericana contemporánea, Nuestra tierra, Montevideo, 1969

== Editions, forewords and translations ==
- Louis-Auguste Blanqui: L'Éternité par les astres. Seconde édition avec amendements at ajouts, édité avec une introduction et notes par Lisa Block de Behar, Slatkine, Genève, 2009
- Haroldo de Campos, Don de poesía: ensayos críticos sobre su obra. Coordinación de Lisa Block de Behar, Linardi & Risso, Montevideo, 2009
- Cine y totalitarismo. Lisa Block de Behar & Eduardo Rinesi (Editores), La Crujía, Buenos Aires, 2007
- France - Amérique latine: Croisements de lettres et de voies. Sous la direction de Walter Bruno Berg & Lisa Block de Behar, L'Harmattan, París, 2007
- Emir Rodríguez Monegal: Obra selecta. Prólogo y antología de Lisa Block de Behar, Biblioteca Ayacucho, Caracas, 2003
- Entre mitos & conocimiento. Coordinación y prólogo de de Lisa Block de Behar, ICLA, Montevideo, 2003
- Comparative Literature Worldwide / La littérature comparée dans le monde. Vol. II. Editor Lisa Block de Behar, ICLA, Montevideo, 2000
- Louis-Auguste Blanqui: La eternidad a través de los astros. Traducción y prólogo de Lisa Block de Behar, Siglo XXI Editores, México, 2000
- Escrito sobre el cine. Edición y prólogo de Lisa Block de Behar, CSIC, Montevideo, 1997
- Louis-Auguste Blanqui: L'Éternité par les astres. Préface de Lisa Block de Behar, Slatkine, París/Genève, 1996
- De la amistad y otras coincidencias: Adolfo Bioy Casares en el Uruguay. Coordinación de Lisa Block de Behar e Isidra Solari, CCIS, Montevideo, 1993
- Lautréamont y Laforgue: La cuestión de los orígenes/La quête des origines. Editado por Lisa Block de Behar, François Caradec y Daniel Lefort, Academia Nacional de Letras, Montevideo, 1993
- Christian Metz y la teoría del cine. Versión, Buenos Aires, 1992
- Términos de comparación. Los estudios literarios entre historias y teorías. Edición y prólogo de Lisa Block de Behar, Academia Nacional de Letras, Montevideo, 1991
- Diseminario. La desconstrucción, otro descubrimiento de América. Edición y prólogo de Lisa Block de Behar, xyz, Montevideo, 1987
- Emir Rodríguez Monegal. Homenaje. Edición y prólogo de Lisa Block de Behar. Ministerio de educación y cultura, Montevideo, 1987.
- Alberto Oreggioni, (dirección), Diccionario de literatura uruguaya, vol. 1, Arca, 1987, pages 108–109
- Gran Enciclopedia del Uruguay, vol. 1, El Observador, 2001, no page number
- Miguel Ángel Campodónico, Nuevo Diccionario de la Cultura Uruguaya, Librería Linardi y Risso, 2003, page 52
