= Augusto Monterroso =

Guatemalan writer

- Born: December 21, 1921; Tegucigalpa
- Died: February 8, 2003 (aged 81); Mexico City
- Occupations: Short story writer, editor, diplomat
- Spouse: Bárbara Jacobs
- Writing career
- Language: Spanish
- Period: 1941 - 2002
- Notable awards: Premio Príncipe de Asturias de las Letras; 2000 Premio Nacional de Literatura Miguel Angel Asturias; 1997; Premio Juan Rulfo; 1996 Premio Xavier Villaurrutia; 1975
- Literary movement: Generación del Cuarenta, "Boom" generation

Augusto Monterroso Bonilla (December 21, 1921 – February 8, 2003) was a Honduran writer who adopted Guatemalan nationality, known for the ironical and humorous style of his short stories. He is considered an important figure in the Latin American "Boom" generation, and received several awards, including the Prince of Asturias Award in Literature (2000), Miguel Ángel Asturias National Prize in Literature (1997), and Juan Rulfo Award (1996). Monterroso was a member of the Honduran Academy of Language.

== Life ==
Monterroso was born in Tegucigalpa, Honduras, to a Honduran mother and Guatemalan father. In 1936 his family settled definitively in Guatemala City, where he would remain until early adulthood. Here he published his first short stories and began his clandestine work against the dictatorship of Jorge Ubico. To this end he founded the newspaper El Espectador with a group of other writers.

He was detained and exiled to Mexico City in 1944 for his opposition to the dictatorial regime. Shortly after his arrival in Mexico, the revolutionary government of Jacobo Arbenz triumphed in Guatemala, and Monterroso was assigned to a minor post in the Guatemalan embassy in Mexico. In 1953 he moved briefly to Bolivia upon being named Guatemalan consul in La Paz. He relocated to Santiago de Chile in 1954, when Arbenz's government was toppled with help and intervention of the United States of America.

In 1956 he returned definitively to Mexico City, where he would occupy various academic and editorial posts and continue his work as a writer for the rest of his life.

In 1988, Augusto Monterroso received the highest honor the Mexican government can bestow on foreign dignitaries, the Águila Azteca. He was also awarded the Spanish Prince of Asturias Award, in 2000. In 1997, Monterroso was awarded the Guatemala National Prize in Literature for his body of work.

He died of heart failure at the age of 81 on February 8, 2003, in Mexico City.

== Work ==
Although Monterroso limited himself almost exclusively to the short story form, he is widely considered a central figure in the Latin American Boom, a movement centered on the work of a group of young Latin American novelists. He is recognized alongside such canonical authors as Julio Cortázar, Carlos Fuentes, Juan Rulfo and Gabriel García Márquez.

Save for Lo demás es silencio ("The Rest is Silence"), his foray into the form of the novel, Monterroso only published short pieces. He worked throughout his career to perfect the short story form, often delving into analogous genres (most famously the fable) for stylistic and thematic inspiration. Even Lo demás es silencio, however, largely eschews the traditional novelistic form, opting instead for the loose aggregation of various apocryphal short texts (newspaper clippings, testimonials, diary entries, poems) to sketch the "biography" of its fictional main character.

Monterroso also was known for popularizing short stories and was the author of what is often credited to be one of the world's shortest stories, "El Dinosaurio" ("The Dinosaur"), published in Obras completas (Y otros cuentos). The story reads, in its entirety:

Cuando despertó, el dinosaurio todavía estaba allí.
("When he awoke, the dinosaur was still there.")

Carlos Fuentes wrote of Monterroso (referring specifically to The Black Sheep and Other Fables): "Imagine Borges' fantastical bestiary having tea with Alice. Imagine Jonathan Swift and James Thurber exchanging notes. Imagine a frog from Calaveras County who has seriously read Mark Twain. Meet Monterroso."

== Bibliography ==
- Obras completas (y otros cuentos), 1959.
  - Complete Works (and Other Stories)
- La oveja negra y demás fábulas, 1969.
  - The Black Sheep and Other Fables, trans. Walter I. Bradbury (Doubleday, 1971)
  - The Black Sheep and Other Fables, trans. Rupert Glasgow and Philip Jenkins (Tadworth: Acorn, 2005. ISBN 978-0954495954)
- Movimiento perpetuo, 1972.
  - Perpetual Motion
- Lo demás es silencio, 1978.
  - The Rest Is Silence, trans. Aaron Kerner (New York Review Books, 2024)
- Viaje al centro de la fábula, 1981.
- La palabra mágica, 1983.
- La letra e (Fragmentos de un diario), 1987.
- Esa fauna, 1992. drawings.
- Los buscadores de oro, 1993.
  - The Gold Seekers, trans. Jessica Sequeira (Sublunary Editions, 2023)
- La vaca, 1998.
- Pájaros de Hispanoamérica, 2002.
- Literatura y vida, 2004.

=== Compilations in English ===
- Complete Works and Other Stories, trans. Edith Grossman; University of Texas Press, 1995. ISBN 978-0292751842
  - Includes both Complete Works (and Other Stories) as well as Perpetual Motion
