= Jorge Aguilar Mora =

Mexican writer (1946–2024)

- Born: 9 January 1946; Chihuahua City, Chihuahua, Mexico
- Died: 5 January 2024 (aged 77); Bethesda, Maryland, U.S.
- Occupations: Essayist, novelist, poet, professor, literary critic
- Writing career
- Language: Spanish
- Notable awards: Xavier Villaurrutia Award (2015)

Jorge Aguilar Mora (9 January 1946 – 5 January 2024) was a Mexican essayist, novelist, poet, professor and literary critic.

== Biography ==
Aguilar Mora studied Hispanic language and literature at the National Autonomous University of Mexico (UNAM) and received his doctorate from El Colegio de México. He was a professor at both institutions. During the 1968 Movement, he was a representative of El Colegio de México assembly and was arrested. He had to leave the country and settled in Paris with a scholarship, where he established a relationship with Roland Barthes, who became his teacher. Aguilar Mora spread Barthes' ideas and put him in contact with other Mexican intellectuals, whom he influenced.

Among Aguilar Mora's essays, the one he dedicated to Octavio Paz in 1978, titled La divina pareja: Historia y mito en Octavio Paz, was especially important. Its critical nature gave a twist to the academic literature that had been written until then about Paz. He collaborated in the Cancionero folklorico de México, a compilation of popular Mexican lyrics of the 20th century, directed by philologist Margit Frenk and published between 1975 and 1985 by El Colegio de México. Aguilar Mora won the Xavier Villaurrutia Award in 2015.

Among his students was Gabriela Brimmer, whom Aguilar Mora encouraged to write poetry.

== Death ==
Aguilar Mora died in Bethesda, Maryland, on 5 January 2024, at the age of 77.

== Works ==
=== Novels ===
- Cadáver lleno de mundo
- Si muero lejos de ti
- Los secretos de la aurora

=== Poems ===
- US Mail Special Delivery
- No hay otro cuerpo
- Esta tierra sin razón y poderosa
- Stabat Mater

=== Essays ===
- La divina pareja: Historia y mito en Octavio Paz
- Una muerte sencilla, justa, eterna: Cultura y guerra durante la Revolución Mexicana
- Un día en la vida del general Obregón
- Sueños de la razón, 1799 y 1800. Umbrales del siglo XIX
