= Fernando Curiel =

Mexican writer (1942–2021)

- Born: 27 July 1942; Mexico City, Mexico
- Died: 14 or 15 August 2021 (aged 79)
- Education: National Autonomous University of Mexico
- Occupations: Writer, lawyer, professor
- Awards: Xavier Villaurrutia Award

Fernando Curiel Defossé (27 July 1942 in Mexico City, Mexico – 14/15 August 2021) was a Mexican writer, lawyer and professor at the National Autonomous University of Mexico since 1980.

He attended the National Autonomous University of Mexico. In 1980, Curiel won the Xavier Villaurrutia Award for his essay Onetti: obra y calculate infortunio. He regularly contributed to the El Financiero.
