= Tita Valencia =

Mexican novelist, poet, screenwriter, pianist and cultural manager

- Born: Guadalupe Valencia Nieto; June 4, 1938 (age 88); Mexico City, Mexico
- Education: Conservatorio Nacional de Música; École Normale de Musique de Paris
- Occupations: Writer, pianist, cultural manager
- Notable work: Minotauromaquia
- Awards: Xavier Villaurrutia Award (1976)

Guadalupe Valencia Nieto (born June 4, 1938), better known as Tita Valencia, is a Mexican novelist, poet, screenwriter, pianist, and cultural manager. She won the 1976 Xavier Villaurrutia Award for her novel Minotauromaquia.

== Biography ==
Tita Valencia studied piano at the Conservatorio Nacional de Música. After graduating, she earned a postgraduate degree at the École Normale de Musique de Paris, and offered concerts in prominent venues, such as the Palacio de Bellas Artes in Mexico City. She also attended literary workshops taught by Juan José Arreola and Juan Rulfo.

In addition to working in radio and television as a screenwriter and music critic, she has held various positions related to cultural management – as a literary coordinator for the National Workers' Culture Council, coordinator of the National Autonomous University of Mexico's cultural extension program in San Antonio, deputy director of the Museo de Arte Moderno, and coordinator of cultural events such as Operalia 94 and the International Plácido Domingo Opera Contest.

Valencia has written for various national and international print media, such as Cuadernos del Unicornio, Excélsior, La Música en México, México en la Cultura, Plural, Revista de la Universidad Iberoamericana, Revista de Literatura Mexicana Contemporánea, Revista Universidad de México, and American Review.

Her 2007 novel Urgente decir te amo (1932–1942) is an introspective attempt to recreate the story of her parents' relationship, interwoven with other stories in the era after the Mexican Revolution, drawing on letters from her father, Mario Carlos Valencia, who died when she was five years old.

== Awards and recognitions ==
- Xavier Villaurrutia Award (1976) for Minotauromaquia

== Selected works ==
- El hombre negro (1958), with Juan José Arreola, short stories
- Minotauromaquia. Crónica de un desencuentro (1976; republished in 1999), ISBN 9789701835555, novel
- Rafael Nieto : la Patria y más allá: antología (1995), ISBN 9789681653880, biography
- El trovar clus de las jacarandas (1995), ISBN 9789683641120, poetry
- Esencia y presencia guadalupanas: un contracanto secular (2000), ISBN 9789683675255, essay
- Urgente decir te amo (1932–1942) (2007), ISBN 9789707620292, novel
