= María Luisa Puga =

Mexican writer

María Luisa Puga (3 February 1944 – 25 December 2004) was a Mexican writer and essayist. She wrote for the Mexican newspapers El Universal, La Jornada, La Plaza and Unomásuno. Her 1983 novel Pánico o peligro won the Xavier Villaurrutia Award. She won the Juan Ruiz de Alarcón prize in 1996.

== Biography ==
Puga was born in Mexico City. She and her siblings went to live with her grandmother in Acapulco when she was 9 years old, after the death of their mother. After her father's second marriage, they moved to Mazatlán. When she was 24 years old, she traveled to both Europe and Africa (Nairobi, Kenya). After about a decade in Europe, María Luisa Puga returned to Mexico and published her first novel, Las Posibilidades del Odio (The Possibilities of Hate), in 1978. There was a lot of critical attention about her first novel because of the comparison she made of Kenya’s seventy-year struggle for a better future with the situation in Mexico.

Many critics remark that Puga's work is simple storytelling; the simplicity of her writing is what gives it its charm. Common themes in Puga's work include the socio-psychological makeup of the individual and history. She is said to examine the social situation in Mexico from the late 1960s to the present day by telling her own personal story. Political and social situations are reflected by how they affect the protagonists in the stories she writes.

The last years of her life she lived in Zirahuén, Michoacán, Mexico. She was a coordinator of literary workshops around Mexico. María Luisa Puga died on 25 December 2004 in Mexico City. Her unpublished diaries, where Puga touched upon many facets of her literary and personal life, were donated to the University of Texas at Austin's Benson Latin American Collection by her sister Patricia in January 2017.

== Works ==
=== Novels ===
- Las posibilidades del odio. México: Siglo XXI, 1978; 2nd edition: 1981; 3rd edition: Aldus-Conaculta, 2003.
- Cuando el aire es azul. México: Siglo XXI, 1980.
- Pánico o peligro. México, Siglo XXI, 1983. 2nd edition: Fondo de Cultura Económica, 2002.
- La forma del silencio. México: Siglo XXI, 1987.
- Antonia. México: Grijalbo, 1989. 2nd edition: Ariadne: 1999; 3rd edition: Punto de Lectura, 2004.
- Las razones del lago. México/ Barcelona/ Buenos Aires: Grijalbo, 1991.
- La viuda. México: Grijalbo, 1994.
- La reina. México: Planeta Mexicana, 1995. (= Biblioteca Breve)
- Inventar ciudades. México: Alfaguara, 1998.
- Nueve madrugadas y media. México: Alfaguara, 2003.
- Diario del dolor. Mèxico: Alfaguara, 2004.

=== Collections of short stories ===
- Inmóvil sol secreto. México: La Máquina de Escribir, 1979.
- Accidentes. México: Martín Casillas, 1981.
- Intentos. México: Grijalbo, 1987.
- De intentos y accidentes. México: Instituto de Seguridad y Servicios Sociales de los Trabajadores del Estado, 2001.

=== Essays, chronicles and interviews ===
- La cerámica de Hugo X. Velázquez: cuando rinde el horno. México: Martín Casillas, 1983.
- Itinerario de palabras, together with Mónica Mansour. México: Folios Ediciones, 1987.
- De cuerpo entero (autobiography). México: UNAM/ECO, 1990.
- Ruptura y diversidad. México: Coordinación de Difusión Cultural, Dirección de Literatura, UNAM, 1990.
- Lo que le pasa al lector. México: Grijalbo, 1991 (= Narrativa Grijalbo).
- Crónicas de una oriunda del kilómetro X en Michoacán. México: Consejo Nacional para la Cultura y las Artes, 1995 (= Cuaderno de viaje).
- Diario del dolor. México: Alfaguara/Universidad del Claustro de Sor Juana/Consejo Nacional para la Cultura y las Artes, 2004.

=== Children's literature ===
- El tornado. Illustrations by Rosario Valderrama. México: CIDCLI - LIMUSA, 1985 (= La Hormiga de Oro).
- Los tenis acatarrados. México: ECO, 1991.
- La ceremonia de iniciación. México: FCE, 1994 (= Travesías).
- A Lucas todo le sale mal. México: FCE, 2005 (= A la orilla del viento).

=== Translations ===
- Helmut and Florian.. Trans. Leland H. Chambers. Mississippi Review 16, no. 1 (1987): 66-70.
- The Trip.. Trans. Nick Caistor. The Faber Book of Contemporary Latin American Short Stories, 86-91. London & Boston: Faber & Faber, 1989.
- The Hidden Language of Reality.. Trans. Leland H. Chambers. Rolling Stock 17/18 (1990):28.
- You Take Off for the Beach.. Trans. Leland H. Chambers. Rolling Stock 17/18 (1990):29.
- Butterflies.. Trans. Alfred Mac Adam. Review: Latin American Literature and Arts 44 (January–June 1991): 165-171.
- Memories of the Oblique.. Trans. Leland H. Chambers. Secrets of Wood and Silence: Short Stories by Latin American Women Writers. Special issue of Latin American Literary Review 19, no. 37 (January–June 1991): 165-171.
- A Terrible Situation.. Trans. Leland H. Chambers. Latin American Literary Review 20, no.39 (January–June 1992):58-61.
- The Hidden Language.. Trans. Annette Cowart and Reginald Gibbons. New Writing from Mexico. Special issue of TriQuarterly 85 (Fall 1992):317-335.
- The Natural Thing to Do.. Trans. Judith de Mesa. New Writing from Mexico. Special issue of TriQuarterly 85 (Fall 1992):219-225.
- New Paths.. Trans. Elizabeth Gamble Miller. Manoa: A Pacific Journal of International Writing 4, no.2 (Fall 1992): 17-20.
- The Trip.. Trans. Nick Caistor. Pyramids of Glass: Short Fiction from Modern Mexico, 157-163. San Antonio: Corona, 1994.

== Selected criticism ==
- Bradu, Fabienne: Señas particulares: Escritoras (Ensayos sobre escritoras mexicanas del siglo XX). México: Fondo de Cultura Económica, 1987, 118-135. ISBN 968-16-2689-3 (Spanish)
- De Beer, Gabriella. Contemporary Mexican Women Writers: Five Voices. Austin: University of Texas Press, 1996, 11-57. ISBN 0-292-71586-2
- López, Irma M.: Historia, escritura e identidad: la novelística de Maria Luisa Puga. New York / Vienna [etc.]: Peter Lang, 1996. (Wor(l)ds of change; 23) ISBN 0-8204-3052-8 (Spanish)
- Pfeiffer, Erna: EntreVistas. Diez escritoras mexicanas desde bastidores. Frankfurt a.M.: Vervuert Verlag, 1992, 123-135. ISBN 3-89354-051-2 (Spanish)
