= José Luis Rivas =

Mexican writer(born January 28, 1950)

- Jose Luis Rivas in 2015
- Born: January 28, 1950 (age 76); Tuxpan, Veracruz
- Education: National Autonomous University of Mexico
- Occupations: Poet; translator; scholar
- Writing career
- Notable awards: Xavier Villaurrutia Award (1990); National Prize for Arts and Sciences (2009); Fine Arts Medal (2026)

José Luis Rivas Vélez (January 28, 1950) is a Mexican poet, translator, essayist, and literary scholar.

== Biography ==
Rivas was born in Tuxpan, Veracruz on January 28, 1950. In 1969, he moved to Mexico City to study Philosophy and Hispanic Literature at the School of Philosophy and Letters, part of the National Autonomous University of Mexico (UNAM).

He has written over a dozen poetry books. His published works include Tierra nativa (1982), Relámpago la muerte (1985), La transparencia del deseo (1987), Brazos de mar (1990), Luz de mar abierto (1992), Río (1996) and Estuario (1997). He has also worked extensively as a literary translator. He has worked in T. S. Eliot, Arthur Rimbaud, Saint-John Perse, Derek Walcott, and other international writers.

Rivas is a researcher at the Institute for Linguistic and Literary Research (Spanish: Instituto de Investigaciones Lingüístico-Literarias) at the Veracruzana University (Spanish: Universidad Veracruzana).

Rivas has received numerous awards, including the Carlos Pellicer National Poetry Prize (1982), the Aguascalientes National Poetry Prize (1986), the Xavier Villaurrutia Award (1990), the Ramón López Velarde National Poetry Prize (1996), the Poetry Translation Prize (Spanish: Premio de Traducción de Poesía) and the Gonzalo Aguirre Beltrán Medal.

In 2009, he received Mexico's National Prize for Arts and Sciences in the Linguistics and Literature category, the highest distinction by the Mexican Government to writer. In 2011, Conaculta organized an homage ceremony for him.

In 2013, he was elected as a corresponding member of the Mexican Academy of Language. In 2026, Rivas received the Fine Arts Medal (Spanish: Medalla Bellas Artes) from the Instituto Nacional de Bellas Artes y Literatura (English: National Institute of Fine Arts and Literature).

== Selected works ==
- Raz de marea, anthology (1975–1992)
- Ante un cálido norte, anthology (1993–2003)
- Fresca de risa (1981)
- Tierra nativa (1982)
- Relámpago la muerte (1985)
- La balada del capitán (1986)
- La transparencia del deseo (1986)
- Brazos de mar (1990)
- Asunción de las islas (1992)
- Luz de mar abierto (1992)
- Río (1996)
- Estuario (1998)
- Pájaros (2005)
- Un navío un amor (2005)
- Paraíso para todos (2020), poems anthology (1982‑2014)

== Awards and recognition ==
- 1982: Carlos Pellicer National Poetry Prize for his book Tierra nativa
- 1986: Aguascalientes National Poetry Prize for his book La transparencia del deseo
- 1990: Xavier Villaurrutia Award for his book Brazos de mar
- 1996: Ramón López Velarde National Poetry Prize for his book Río
- 1990: National Poetry Translation Prize, for his book Poetas metafísicos ingleses
- 2002 Gonzalo Aguirre Beltrán medal, from the Veracruz Government
- 2009 National Prize for Arts and Sciences in the Linguistics and Literature category from the Mexican Government
- 2011: Recognition ceremony by the National Council for Culture and Arts (Spanish: Consejo Nacional para la Cultura y las Artes or CONACULTA)
- 2020: Sinaloa National Literature Award (Spanish: Premio Nacional de Letras Sinaloa)
- 2026: Fine Arts Medal (Spanish: Medalla Bellas Artes) from the Instituto Nacional de Bellas Artes y Literatura (English: National Institute of Fine Arts and Literature)
