= Myriam Moscona =

Mexican journalist, translator and poet (born 1955)

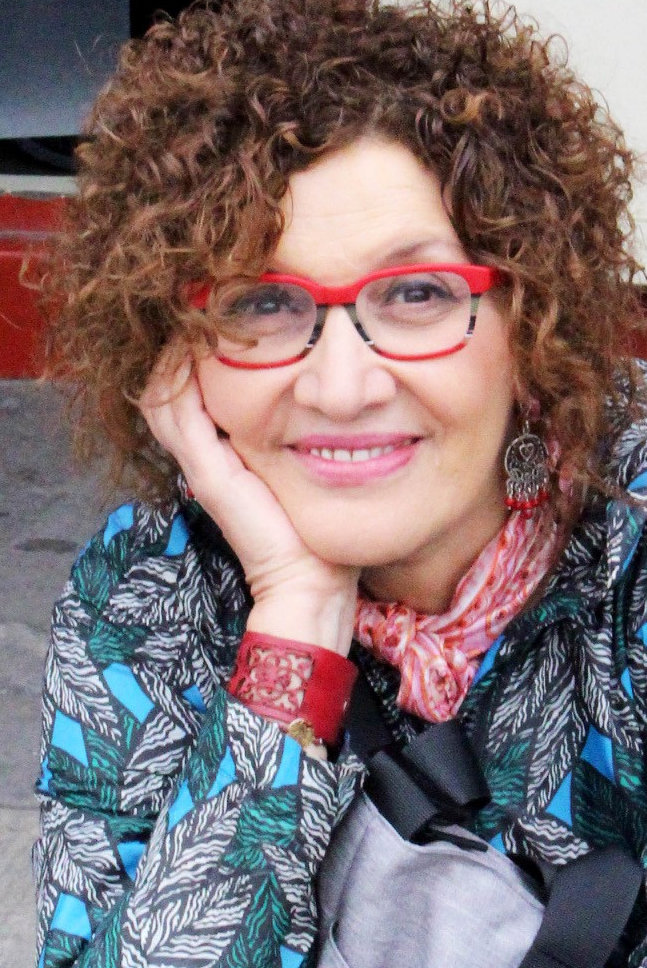
- Born: 1955 (age 70–71); Mexico City, Mexico
- Occupations: Journalist; translator; poet

Myriam Moscona (מרים מוסקונה) (born 1955 in Mexico City) is a Mexican journalist, translator and poet in the Ladino and Spanish languages who comes from a Bulgarian Sephardi Jewish family. She teaches at Miami University. She was the artist in-residence from the Banff Centre for the Arts in 2000.

== Awards ==
- 2012 Xavier Villaurrutia Award
- 2006 Guggenheim Fellowship
- 1998 Aguascalientes National Poetry Award, for Las visitantes.

== Selected works ==
=== Poem ===
Rectas son las curvas de Moebius/En torcedumbre y doloridos/Con esas cintas nos krearon

- LA CINTA DE MOEBIUS

Moebius' curves are straight/Within twisting and sorrow/We were created with these ribbons

- MOEBIUS RIBBON

=== IMER ===
- "Instructivo para descifrar un mal", IMER

=== Books ===
- Último jardín El Tucán de Virginia, 1983
- Las visitantes (1989, Premio Nacional de Poesía de Aguascalientes)
- Las preguntas de Natalia Illustrator Fernando Medina, CIDCLI, 1991, ISBN 978-968-494-049-9; CIDCLI, 1997, ISBN 978-968-494-049-9
- El árbol de los nombres Secretaría de Cultura, Gobierno de Jalisco, 1992, ISBN 978-970-624-000-2
- De frente y de perfil: Semblanzas de poetas Ciudad de México, DDF, 1994
- Vísperas Fondo de Cultura Económica, 1996, ISBN 978-968-16-5085-8
- Negro marfil Universidad Autónoma Metropolitana, 2000; Universidad del Claustro de Sor Juana, 2006
- El que nada, Ediciones Era, 2006, ISBN 978-968-411-671-9
- En la superficie azul, Costa Rica 2008.
- De par en par (2009)
- Tela de Sevoya (2012)

=== Anthologies ===
- "Excerpt from Black Ivory", The Oxford Book of Latin American Poetry: A Bilingual Anthology, Editors Cecilia Vicuña, Ernesto Livon-Grosman, Oxford University Press US, 2009,ISBN 978-0-19-512454-5
- The River Is Wide/el Rio Es Ancho: Twenty Mexican Poets, Editor Marlon L. Fick, Translator Marlon L. Fick, UNM Press, 2005, ISBN 978-0-8263-3438-1

== Review ==
Ivory Black's edition was made by Sandra Lorenzano, rector of the UCSJ, with a foreword by the Chilean writer Soledad Bianchi. Se trata de un poema de largo aliento, una suma de fragmentos que construyen el conjunto" de versos que, en algunos tramos, se pueden leer de diversas maneras: de izquierda a derecha, de derecha a izquierda, de arriba hacia abajo y viceversa. It is a long-winded poem,a sum of fragments that make up the whole "of verses which, in some sections, can be read in different ways: from left to right, right to left, top to bottom and vice versa.
