= Inés Arredondo =

Mexican writer (1928–1989)

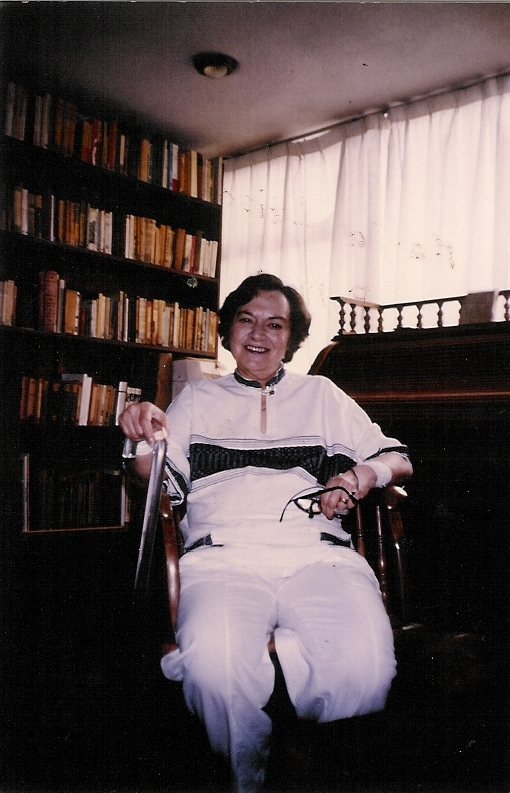
- Inés Arredondo in her apartment in Mexico City, May 1989.
- Born: Inés Camelo Arredondo; March 20, 1928 Culiacán, Mexico
- Died: November 2, 1989 (aged 61) Mexico City, Mexico
- Occupation: Writer
- Education: School of Philosophy and Letters (National Autonomous University of Mexico)
- Genre: Short story, essay, novel
- Notable awards: Xavier Villaurrutia Award (1979)

Inés Camelo Arredondo (March 20, 1928 – November 2, 1989) was a Mexican writer. In 1947 she enrolled in the department of Philosophy at the National Autonomous University of Mexico. In 1958 she married the writer Tomás Segovia. She won the Xavier Villaurrutia Award in 1979 for her novel Río subterráneo .

== Biography ==
Inés Camelo Arredondo was born in Culiacán, Sinaloa to a middle-class family that grew poor later on; her father, Mario Camelo y Vega, was a liberal doctor, and Arredondo was the oldest of nine. She passed a large part of her childhood in the Eldorado sugar plantation where her maternal grandfather Francisco Arredondo once worked. Between 1936 and 1944 she studied at the Colegio Montferrant in Culiacán, a school run by Spanish nuns. From 1945 to 1946 she studied at the Colegio Aquiles Serdán in Guadalajara.

In 1947 she enrolled in the National Autonomous University of Mexico in Mexico City, for a degree in philosophy. However, she underwent a spiritual crisis as a result of reading Friedrich Nietzsche and Søren Kierkegaard, and due to the skeptical and atheist environment that surrounded her. She became suicidal, at which point her doctor advised her to change her area of study. So, in 1948 she began studying Hispanic Literature. She finished her studies in 1950 with a thesis on "Political and social ideas and feelings in Mexican theater, 1900–1950" ("Sentimientos e ideas políticas y sociales en el Teatro Mexicano de 1900 a 1950"). Between 1950 and 1952 she studied drama, and in 1953 she took a Library Science course. During her studies she came to know many people who had been exiled during the Spanish Civil War. The republicans were, for her, a strong counterpoint to the strong nationalist tendencies in Mexico at the time. During this period, she also discovered French existentialism, surrealism, the Generation of 27, and the writing of Juan Rulfo and Juan José Arreola. She lived with classmates Rosario Castellanos, Jaime Sabines and Rubén Bonifaz Nuño, and her teachers included Julio Torri, Francisco Monterde and Carlos Pellicer. In 1958, she married writer Tomás Segovia, who she shared many interests with. After the birth of their first daughter, Inés, her second child, José, was stillborn, leading to another spiritual crisis.

Between 1952 and 1955 she worked in the National Library; later, she took the position of Emilio Carballido in the School of Fine Arts for Theater. She collaborated on the drafting of the Dictionary of Latin American Literature edited by UNESCO, and between 1959–1961 she edited the Dictionary of Mexican History and Biographies. She also wrote for radio and television shows and worked as a translator. Her translation work led to the idea for her first original work, "El membrillo" (published in 1957 in the university magazine). From that point on, she did not stop writing.

She gave birth to two more children, Ana and Francisco Segovia, and worked with her husband on the Mexican Literature Review, although her name did not appear on it until she separated from him. Elena Poniatowska said that she was something of a muse, the only woman in her generation, and that Huberto Batis and Juan García Ponce were her "admirers" (Poniatowska 1994: 2). Several of her stories were published in the Review. In 1961 she received a scholarship from the Mexican Center for Writers and in 1962 she received another one from the Fairfield Foundation in New York.

Despite their marital troubles, she and her husband decided to wipe the slate clean and move to Montevideo (Uruguay), where she worked in the Latin American Free Trade Association (LAFTA). However, in 1962 they separated, and Inés returned to Mexico. Their divorce became official in 1965. As a divorced mother, she held the following positions to support her children:

- Member of the editing committee for the Mexican Literature Review until its end in 1965
- Investigator in the Coordination of the Humanities (1965–1975)
- Invited to conferences at Indiana University and Purdue University in 1966
- Professor at the National Autonomous University of Mexico (UNAM), teaching courses on the Golden Age and literature (1965–1968)
- Critic in the review section of "México en la cultura", supplement to the magazine Siempre! (1965–1967)
- Collaborator in the University Radio of UNAM (1965–1970)
- Collaborator in the Dictionary of Mexican Writers in the Center for Literary Studies at UNAM (1967)
- Professor in the School of Theater in the National Institute of Fine Arts (1965–1967)
- Editor in the Department of Information and Press, UNAM (1965–1968)
- Co-wrote the feature-length film Mariana with Juan García Ponce (1967)
- Professor of History of Theater in the Iberoamerican University (1970)
- Researcher in the Center for Historical Studies of Mexico, CONDUMEX (1966–1973)

En 1965 she published her first book of short stories, La Señal (The Signal). From this point on, the short story was her preferred style; Only Opus 123 (1983) could be considered a short novel. Perhaps as a result of her excessive workload or her psychological conflicts she began to have issues with her spinal column. She underwent five operations and spent many years in a wheelchair. During this period, Elena Poniatowska described her as "A bedridden women with an indomitable spirit".

In 1972 she remarried with the surgeon Carlos Ruiz Sánchez. She picked up her literary studies again, and wrote her masters thesis on the Mexican poet and essayist, Jorge Cuesta. In 1980 she finished her studies with an honorable mention.

In 1979 she published her second book, Río subterráneo (Underground River), which won the Xavier Villaurrutia Award and critical praise. In 1979 the US Library of Congress in Washington, DC made recordings of three of her stories for the series Voz Viva de México. In 1983 the editorial Oasis publish Opus 123, and one year later her children's story Historia Verdadera de una Princesa (True Story of a Princess) was published. In 1988, her final book of short stories, Los espejos (The Mirrors) was published. In the same year she edited her Obras Completas (Complete Works) with the publisher Siglo XXI. Around her 60th birthday she received several prizes and honors, the most important being an honorary degree from the Autonomous University of Sinaloa on May 27, 1988. In November 1988, a festival dedicated to her was organized in Culiacán. She spent the last years of her life confined to her bed and on November 2, 1989, she died in her apartment in Mexico City.

== Literary works ==
=== About her works and contexts ===
Inés Arrendondo's work was a turning point for Mexican literature, especially that written by women due to the taboo topics she embarked on in her many works. Her main focus was family and partner relationships. Her stories questioned roles and the status quo. Not only did she expand on eroticism, madness, death, perversion, love, passion, voyeurism, loss of innocence, infidelity and betrayal, but she also denounced hidden secrets in Mexican families, such as sexual abuse, the abuse between parents to their children, authoritarianism, machismo, abortion, incest and bullying. Her work as a literary critic and essay writer is reflected and captured in a series of texts published by different magazines and cultural supplements of Mexico throughout her time, in which she left her footprint as an intellectual reader and cultural promoter. Today all these texts can be found under the book titled Ensayos, written by Ines Arredondo and published in 2012. In the book she emphasizes her autobiography and the extensive study she conducted on Jorge Cuesta, An original investigation that she analyzed for the first time in Mexico, on one of the main examples of the Contemporáneos (Contemporary) group. Arredondo like many others of her time, was a loyal followers of his works.

Arredondo was part of the Half Century Generation, a decade that consists of the forties to the mid-fifties. This time period became definitive for many Mexican artists of all sorts. Arredondo was also baptized as a member of the Casa del Lago (The Lake House Group), of “La Revista Mexicana de Literatura” ( The Mexican Literature Magazine). The members of The Lake House Group not only developed a creative play, they also did critical work with different artistic approaches such as theater, cinema, painting, music, poetry, novels, tales and essays, while also working with topics that were once censored in Mexico.

During Arredondo's lifetime she received four official recognitions from the Mexican government and from the Autonomous University of Sinaloa (Universidad Autónoma de Sinaloa or (UAS). Arredondo received the medal “Fray Bernardo de Balbuena” granted for the first time in the history of Sinaloa in November 1986. An honorary ceremony was held in Culiacan, Mexico in recognition of Arredonodo's literary merits in March 1987. An honorary doctorate was given to her by the UAS in May 1988. There was also a second tribute made for her for her quality literary work during the cultural festival of Sinaloa in 1988. [open translation from the website "Enciclopedia de la literatura en México"

On El río subterráneo:

Winning the “El Premio Villaurrutia” (1970), The book “Río subterráneo” published in 1979 is the second book out of her three storybooks. The book translates to “the underground river” and the title of the book suggests its contents, which is the hidden actions of men and women. The book takes up various concerns and thematics of “La Señal” (another book written by Arredondo) like the filtration of evil, the lack of love, the passion, the triangulation of desire and perversion. Most of her characters are involved in ill-fated searches for the Absolute through both excessively passionate and sadomasochistic relationships. (Open translation from)

Anthologies

- Obras Completas, Mexico: Siglo XXI/DICOFUR, 1988.
- Cuentos completos. México: Fondo de Cultura Económica, 2011.

=== Books of short stories ===
- La señal. México: Era, 1965 (Colección Alacena).
- Río subterráneo. México: Joaquín Mortiz, 1979 (Col. Nueva Narrativa Hispánica). ISBN 9789706901682, OCLC 433823945
- Los Espejos. México: Joaquín Mortiz/Planeta, 1988 (Serie del Volador).

=== Novels ===
- Opus 123. México: Oasis, 1983 (Los Libros del Fakir, 23)

=== Essays ===
- Acercamiento a Jorge Cuesta. México: SEP/Diana, 1982.
- Ensayos. México: Fondo de Cultura Económica, 2012. ISBN 9786071609656, OCLC 807040570

=== Children's books ===
- Historia Verdadera de una Princesa. Cuento para niños. México: CIDCLI/ Secretaría de Educación Pública 1984 (Reloj de Cuentos).

=== English translations ===
- The Underground River and Other Stories. Trans. Cynthia Steele. Lincoln/London: University of Nebraska Press, 1996. OCLC 807718151
- Margarita Vargas and Juan Bruce Novoa. “The Shunammite.” By Inés Arredondo. Mundus Artium (1985): 36–45.
- Margarita Vargas and Juan Bruce Novoa. “Mariana.” By Inés Arredondo. Fiction (1981): 156–64.

=== German translations ===
- "Die Sunemiterin", traducción por Barbara Kinter, en: Alcántara, Marco (ed.): Frauen in Lateinamerika 2. Erzählungen und Berichte. München: Deutscher Taschenbuch Verlag, 1986, pp. 80–91 (dtv, 10522).
- "Sommer", traducción por Erna Pfeiffer, en: Pfeiffer, Erna (ed.): AMORica Latina, Viena: Wiener Frauenverlag, 1991, pp. 55–64.
