= Adolfo Dollero =

Italian Mexican historian

- Born: Adolfo Dionigi Giacinto Giacomo Maria Dollero; November 11, 1872; Turin, Piedmont, Italy
- Died: September 2, 1936 (aged 63); Mexico City, Mexico, Mexico
- Spouse: Maria Luisa Paoletti

Adolfo Dollero (November 11, 1872), son of Tancredi Dollero and Ernestina Cane, was an Italian Mexican historian who travelled and lived in many countries in Latin America. He married Maria Luisa Paoletti, countess of Rodoretto, from the region of Piemonte in Italy.

== Works ==
He authored various books among them:

- México al día (impressiones y notas de viaje), 1911, publisher Paris/México, Librería de la Viuda de C Bouret, 972 pagine, con immagini
- Il Messico d’oggi, 1914, Milano, Ulrico Hoepli ed, 909 pagine, con 300 illustrazioni, 20 tavole e una carta itineraria
- ¿El problema social ha sido ó no el móvil de las últimas revoluciones mexicanas?, 1915, en: La Reforma Social, La Habana, Tomo IV, abril a julio de 1915, pp 412–423
- Consideraciones sobre la guerra europea, 1915, en: La Reforma Social, La Habana, Tomo V, agosto a noviembre de 1915, pp 29–47
- Cultura Cubana/Cuban Culture, 1916, Habana, Imprenta “El Siglo XX”, 478 pagine, bilingue: spagnolo e inglese, con numerose immagini
- Las simpatias de Cuba por Italia (Con motivo de la reimpresión del folleto del Dr Fernando Ortiz, “Los Mambises Italianos”), 1917, in: Revista Bimestre Cubana, Vol XII, Septiembre-Octubre 1917, Núm5, pp 327–331, e successivamente, come Proemio, in: Italia y Cuba, 1917, di Fernando Ortiz, pp 3–6
- Cultura Cubana (La provincia de Matanzas y su evolución), 1919, Habana, Imp Seoane y Fernández, 438 pagine
- Cultura Cubana Evolución de la provincia de Matanzas Suplemento, 1919, 32 pagine
- Ideas e Ideales (Revista mensual de propaganda y defensa de la causa aliada), 1919, La Habana, diretta da Adolfo Dollero; pubblicati solo 7 numeri: junio-diciembre 1919
- Cultura Cubana (La provincia de Pinar del Río y su evolución), 1921, Habana, Imp Seoane y Fernández, 436 pagine
- Cultura Cubana Evolución de la provincia de Pinar del Río Suplemento, 1921; non consultato
- Cultura Colombiana Apuntaciones sobre el movimiento intellectual de Colombia, desde la Conquista hasta la época actual, 1930, Bogotá, editorial Cromos, non consultato
- Cultura de Venezuela Apuntaciones sobre la evolución de la cultura desde la Conquista Excursiones, 1933, Caracas, Tipografía Americana, 2 Tomos; il secondo non consultato
- Cultura de Venezuela Apéndice, 1933; non consultato
- Italia y los italianos en la historia y en la cultura de Venezuela, stampatore e anno sconosciuti; non consultato
- Las glorias de Italia en la civilización del mundo, inedito (?), coautore: Manuel Dollero
