= Xavier Villaurrutia Award =

Mexican literary prize

- Awarded for: Literary excellence in Spanish-language literature
- Country: Mexico
- Presented by: Unión de Escritores Mexicanos
- First award: 1955
- Website: Official website

The Xavier Villaurrutia Award (Premio Xavier Villaurrutia) is a literary prize given in Mexico, to a Latin American writer published in Mexico. Founded in 1955, it was named in memory of Xavier Villaurrutia.

Its jury is composed of previously awarded writers. Sometimes, it is not awarded for a specific work, but for an individual's body of work.

Multiple awards have been given in some years, specially between 1972 and 1992. No award was made in 1968, when it was suspended in protest for the imprisonment of José Revueltas, who had won the award in 1967. It wasn't given in 1969 since Elena Poniatowska rejected the award in protest for the 1968 Tlatelolco massacre. (Note: Elena Poniatowska was offered the 1969 award for her chronicle of the 1968 Tlatelolco massacre, called La noche de Tlatelolco, but she rejected it in an open letter published in Excélsior newspaper, addressed to then-President Luis Echeverría, who was responsible for the massacre, stating, 'Who will award the dead?')

It's a distinct award from the Xavier Villaurrutia Medal (Spanish: Medalla Xavier Villaurrutia), a theatre award from the Instituto Nacional de Bellas Artes y Literatura (English: National Institute of Fine Arts and Literature).

== Recipients of the award ==
- 1955: Juan Rulfo, for Pedro Páramo (novel)
- 1956: Octavio Paz, for El arco y la lira (essay)
- 1957: Josefina Vicens, El libro vacío (novel)
- 1958: no award
- 1959: Marco Antonio Montes de Oca, for Delante de la luz cantan los pájaros (poetry)
- 1960: Rosario Castellanos, for Ciudad Real (novel)
- 1961: no award
- 1962: no award
- 1963
  - Elena Garro, for Los recuerdos del porvenir (novel)
  - Juan José Arreola, for La feria (novel)
- 1964: Homero Aridjis, for Mirándola dormir (poetry)
- 1965: Salvador Elizondo, for Farabeuf (novel)
- 1966: Fernando del Paso, for José Trigo (novel)
- 1967: José Revueltas, for life’s work
- 1968: suspended
- 1969: Suspended
- 1970: Eduardo Lizalde, for El tigre en la casa (poetry)
- 1971: Carlos Montemayor, for Las llaves de Urgell (short story)
- 1972
  - Juan García Ponce, for Encuentros (short story)
  - Gabriel Zaid, for Leer poetry (essay)
  - Hugo Hiriart, for Galaor (novel)
  - Jaime Sabines and Ernesto Mejía Sánchez, for life’s work
- 1973
  - Federico Arana, for Las jiras (novel)
  - Esther Seligson, for Otros son los sueños (novel)
  - José Emilio Pacheco, for El principio del placer (novel)
  - Tomás Segovia, for Terceto (poetry)
  - Héctor Azar, for Los juegos de azar: seis obras en un acto (theatre)
- 1974
  - Arturo Azuela, for El tamaño del infierno (novel)
  - Julieta Campos, for Tiene los cabellos rojizos y se llama Sabina (novel)
  - Gustavo Sainz, for La princesa del Palacio de Hierro (novel)
  - Manuel Echeverría, for Un redoble muy largo (novel)
- 1975
  - Carlos Fuentes, for Terra Nostra (novel)
  - Augusto Monterroso, for Antología personal (short story)
  - José Vázquez Amaral, for Ezra Pound, cantares completos (essay)
  - Efraín Huerta, for life’s work
- 1976
  - Tita Valencia, for Minotauromaquia (poetry)
  - Jorge Enrique Adoum, for Entre Marx y una mujer desnuda (theatre)
  - Daniel Leyva, for Crispal (novel)
  - Enrique González Rojo, for El quíntuple balar de mis sentidos (poetry)
- 1977
  - Silvia Molina, for La mañana debe seguir gris (novel)
  - Jaime Reyes Rodríguez, for Isla de raíz amarga, insomne raíz (poetry)
  - Amparo Dávila, for Árboles petrificados (short story)
  - Luis Mario Schneider, for La resurrección de Clotilde Goñi (novel)
- 1978
  - José Luis González, for Balada de otro tiempo (novel)
  - Isabel Fraire, for Poemas en el regazo de la muerte (poetry)
  - Emiliano González Campos, for Los sueños de la Bella Durmiente (short story)
  - Ulalume González de León, for El riesgo del placer (essay)
- 1979
  - Carlos Eduardo Turón, for La libertad tiene otro nombre (poetry)
  - Inés Arredondo, for Río subterráneo (novel)
- 1980
  - Sergio Fernández, for Segundo sueño (novel)
  - Fernando Curiel, for Onetti: obra y calculado infortunio (essay)
  - Jesús Gardea, for Septiembre y los otros días (short story)
  - Alí Chumacero, for life’s work
- 1981
  - Margarita Villaseñor, for El rito cotidiano (poetry)
  - Jaime del Palacio, for Parejas (novel)
  - Noé Jitrik, for Fin del ritual (novel)
  - Sergio Pitol, for Nocturno de Bujara (short story)
- 1982
  - Alberto Dallal, for El “dancing” mexicano (essay)
  - Eraclio Zepeda, for Andando el tiempo (short story)
  - Luisa Josefina Hernández, for Apocalipsis cum figuris (theatre)
  - Francisco Cervantes, for Cantado para nadie (poetry)
- 1983
  - Sergie I. Zaitzeff, for El arte de Julio Torri (essay)
  - Carlos Illescas, for Usted es la culpable (poetry)
  - María Luisa Puga, for Pánico o peligro (novel)
  - Héctor Manjarrez, for No todos los hombres son románticos (novel)
- 1984
  - Jomi García Ascot, for Antología personal: poetry (poetry)
  - Carmen Alardín, for La violencia del otoño (poetry)
  - Arturo González Cosío, for El pequeño bestiario ilustrado (poetry)
  - Margo Glantz, for Síndrome de naufragios (short story)
  - Lisa Block de Behar, for Una retórica del silencio (essay)
- 1985: Angelina Muñiz-Huberman, for Huerto cerrado, huerto sellado (short story)
- 1986
  - Sergio Galindo, for Otilia Rauda (novel)
  - Federico Patán, for Último exilio (novel)
- 1987
  - Alberto Ruy Sánchez, for Los nombres del aire (novel)
  - Bárbara Jacobs, for Las hojas muertas (novel)
- 1988
  - Álvaro Mutis, for Ilona llega con la lluvia (novel)
  - Ernesto de la Peña, for Las estratagemas de Dios (short story)
- 1989
  - Carmen Boullosa, for Antes, La salvaja y Papeles irresponsables (novel)
  - Guillermo Sheridan, for Un corazón adicto: la vida de Ramón López Velarde (essay)
- 1990
  - José Luis Rivas, for Brazos de mar (poetry)
  - Emilio García Riera, for El cine es mejor que la vida (memoirs)
- 1991
  - Vicente Quirarte, for El ángel es vampiro (poetry)
  - Gerardo Deniz, for Amor y oxidente
- 1992
  - Daniel Sada, for Registro de causantes (short story)
  - Marco Antonio Campos, for Antología personal (poetry)
- 1993: Jorge López Páez, for Los cerros azules (novel)
- 1994: Francisco Hernández, for Moneda de tres caras (poetry)
- 1995: Carlos Monsiváis, for Los rituales del caos (chronicle)
- 1996: Jaime Labastida, for Animal de silencios y La palabra enemiga (poetry)
- 1997: Jorge Ruiz Dueñas, for Habitaré su nombre y Saravá (poetry)
- 1998: Ignacio Solares, for El sitio (novel)
- 1999: Juan Villoro, for La casa pierde (short story)
- 2000: Vicente Leñero, for La inocencia de este mundo (anthology)
- 2001: Mario Bellatin, for Flores (novel)
- 2002
  - Juan Bañuelos, for A paso de hierba (poetry)
  - Hugo Gutiérrez Vega, for Peregrinaciones: Poesía 1965-2001 Bazar de asombros II (poetry)
- 2003
  - Coral Bracho, for Ese espacio, ese jardín (poetry)
  - Pedro Ángel Palou García, for Con la muerte en los puños (novel)
- 2004: Christopher Domínguez Michael, for Vida de Fray Servando (essay)
- 2005: David Huerta, for Versión (poetry)
- 2006: Alejandro Rossi, por Edén. Vida imaginada (novel)
- 2007
  - Elsa Cross, for Cuaderno de Amorgós (poetry)
  - Pura López Colomé, for y Santo y Seña (poetry)
- 2008: Adolfo Castañón, Viaje a México. Ensayos, crónicas y retratos (essay)
- 2009: Tedi López Mills, Muerte en la rúa Augusta (poetry)
- 2010: Sergio Mondragón, Hojarasca (poetry)
- 2011: Felipe Garrido, Conjuros (short story)
- 2012: Myriam Moscona, Tela de Sevoya (novel)
- 2013: José de la Colina, Libertades imaginadas (essay)
- 2014: Álvaro Uribe Mateos, Autorretrato de familia con perro (novel)
- 2015: Jorge Aguilar Mora, Sueños de la razón, 1799 y 1800. Umbrales del siglo XIX (essay)
- 2016: Alberto Blanco, El canto y el vuelo (essay)
- 2017: David Toscana, Olegaroy (novel)
- 2018: Fabio Morábito, El lector a domicilio (novel)
- 2019: Enrique Serna, El vendedor de silencio (novel)
- 2020: Malva Flores, Estrella de dos puntas (essay)
- 2021: Cristina Rivera Garza, El invencible verano de Liliana (novel)
- 2022: Gonzalo Celorio, Mentideros de la memoria (memoirs)
- 2023: Christian Peña (poet), Quirón (poetry)
- 2024: Mónica Nepote for Las trabajadoras (poetry)
- 2025: Alejandro Arteaga, for Sala de máquinas (short story)

== Sources ==
- "Premio Xavier Villaurrutia". El Poder de la Palabra (in Spanish).
- Literatura, Coordinación Nacional de (2011-08-12). "Premio Xavier Villaurrutia de Escritores para Escritores". literatura.bellasartes.gob.mx (in Spanish). Archived from the original on 2010-06-26.
