= David Toscana =

Mexican novelist

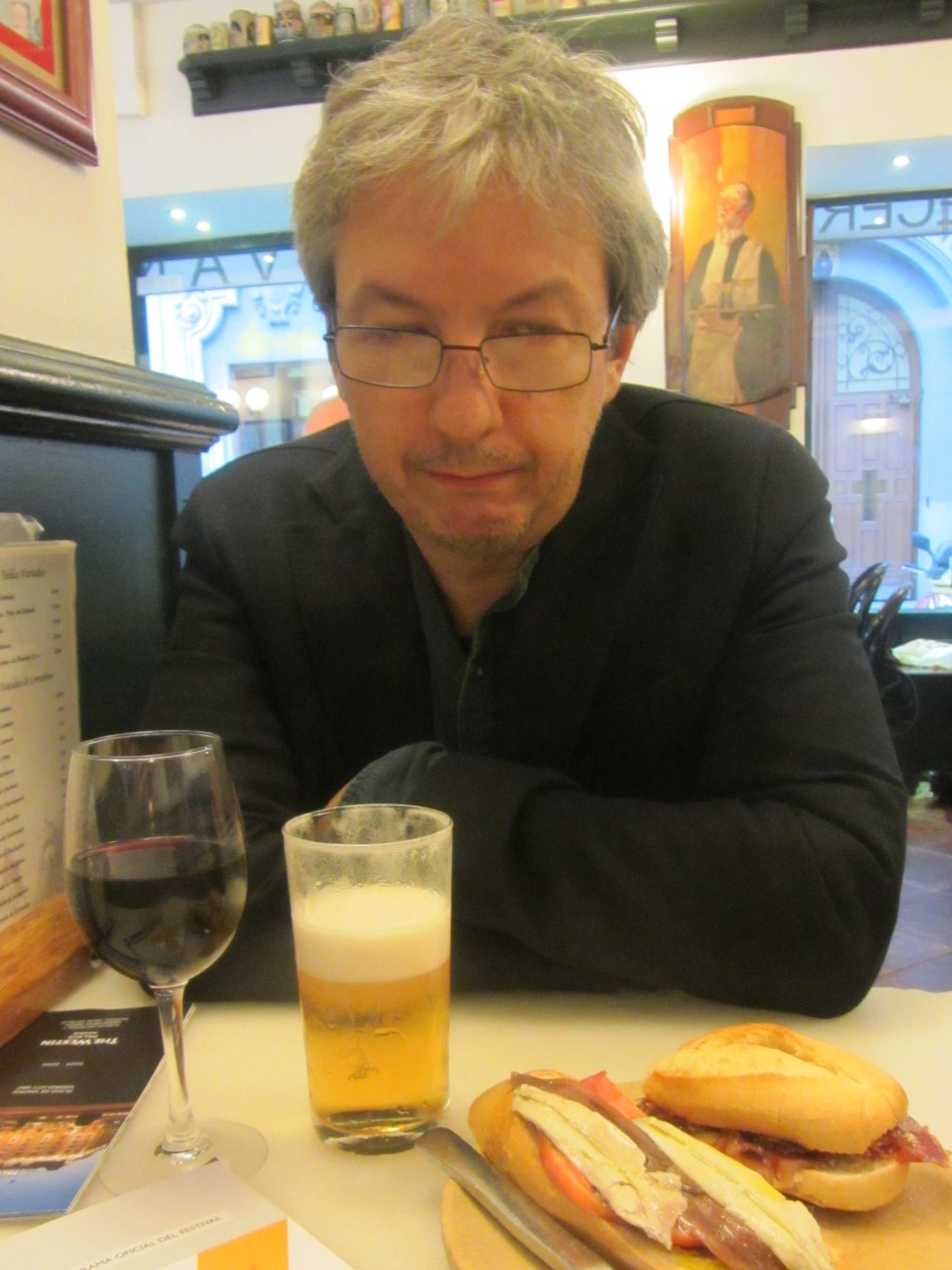
- Born: November 7, 1961 (age 64); Monterrey, Nuevo León, Mexico
- Occupation: Novelist

David Toscana (born 7 November 1961, Monterrey, Nuevo León) is a Mexican writer. He has received numerous awards, among them the Xavier Villaurrutia Award, awarded by the Mexican writers' community to what it considers the best book published in Mexico that year, and the 2026 winner of the Alfaguara Prize.

== Biography ==
Before embarking on a literary career, he graduated as an Industrial and Systems Engineer from the Instituto Tecnológico y de Estudios Superiores de Monterrey (ITESM). Subsequently, he studied at the Escuela de Escritores of the Sociedad General de Escritores de México (SOGEM).

His literary influences include the Spanish classics Miguel de Cervantes and Pedro Calderón de la Barca, and the Latin American writers Juan Carlos Onetti, Jorge Luis Borges, and José Donoso, as well as the Latin American fantastic tradition.

In 1994 he participated in the International Writers Program at the University of Iowa, and in 2003 in the Berliner Künstlerprogramm. Since 2012, he has contributed a column, Toscanadas, to the weekly supplement Laberinto of the newspaper Milenio. He currently resides in Europe.

== Work ==
Toscana's work addresses themes of failure, death, and grief, as illustrated by his novel El último lector, which received the Antonin Artaud Prize, the Premio Bellas Artes de Narrativa Colima para Obra Publicada, and the José Fuentes Mares Prize.

The French newspaper Le Figaro has described him as one of the Mexican authors who elevates the literary scene of his country. In 2002, his novel Santa María del Circo was recognized in the United States as one of the best books of the year. In 2008, he won the José María Arguedas Narrative Prize for El ejército iluminado.

In 2016, he published the novel Evangelia, which offers an alternative, critical retelling of the Catholic Gospels. The story is narrated by Emanuel, the firstborn daughter of Mary and Joseph, who takes the place of Jesus, the male figure foretold by prophecy.

In 2017 he received the Xavier Villaurrutia Award for his novel Olegaroy. The same novel earned him the Premio Elena Poniatowska 2018. In 2026, he won the Alfaguara Prize for his novel El ejército ciego. His work has been published in fifteen languages, including Arabic, French, Greek, Italian, and Serbian.

== Bibliography ==
=== Novels ===
- Las bicicletas (Consejo Nacional para la Cultura y las Artes, Mexico, 1992)
- Estación Tula (Joaquín Mortiz, Mexico, 1995)
- Santa María del Circo (Plaza & Janes, Mexico, 1998)
- Duelo por Miguel Pruneda (Plaza & Janes, Mexico, 2002)
- El último lector (Mondadori, Barcelona, 2005)
- El ejército iluminado (Tusquets, 2006)
- Los puentes de Königsberg (Alfaguara, Mexico, 2009)
- La ciudad que el diablo se llevó (Alfaguara, Mexico, 2012; Candaya, 2020)
- Evangelia (Alfaguara, 2016)
- Olegaroy (Alfaguara, 2017)
- El peso de vivir en la tierra (Alfaguara, Mexico, 2022; Candaya, Spain, 2022)
- El ejército ciego (Alfaguara, Spain, 2026)

=== Short stories ===
- Lontananza (Joaquín Mortiz, Mexico, 1997)
- Brindis por un fracaso (Editorial Aldus/CONACULTA, Mexico, 2006)

== Awards and recognition ==
- 2008: Premio de Narrativa José María Arguedas, for El ejército iluminado
- 2017: Premio Xavier Villaurrutia, for Olegaroy
- 2018: Premio Elena Poniatowska, for Olegaroy
- 2026: Premio Alfaguara de Novela, for El ejército ciego
