= Alejandro Rossi =

Mexican philosopher, essayist, and literary critic (1932–2009)

- Born: Alessandro Rossi; September 22, 1932; Florence, Italy
- Died: June 5, 2009 (aged 76); Mexico City
- Education: National Autonomous University of Mexico
- Occupations: Writer, philosopher, literary critic
- Writing career
- Language: Spanish
- Notable works: Manual del distraído; Edén: Vida imaginada
- Notable awards: Order of the Aztec Eagle 1988; National Prize for Arts 1999; Xavier Villaurrutia Award 2007

Alejandro Rossi (Alessandro Rossi; 22 September 1932 – 5 June 2009) was a renowned Mexican philosopher, essayist, and literary critic. An essayist and writer of short stories and literary texts, he was praised by Spanish and Latin American critics for his undoubted originality.

Alejandro Rossi wrote philosophical essays, short stories, articles and books.

Rossi's writing is marked by a rich language that plays with generic definitions.

== Early life ==
Rossi was born in Florence, Italy, in 1932, to a Venezuelan mother and Italian father. He left a war-torn Europe for America in 1942. After living for a few years in Caracas, Buenos Aires, and Los Angeles, he finally arrived in Mexico at the age of 19, where he settled and spent the rest of his life.

In 1955 he graduated magna cum laude from the National Autonomous University of Mexico's Faculty of Philosophy, where he also studied his doctoral degree from 1966 to 1968. In 1958 he entered the Institute of Philosophical Investigations. Later he pursued postgraduate studies at Magdalen College, Oxford in 1960, and at the University of Freiburg in Germany, where he studied under Martin Heidegger and Max Müller.

He received a grant from El Colegio de México from 1957 to 1958.

== Biography ==
Rossi was co-founder and co-director of the magazine Crítica. Revista Hispanoamericana de Filosofía ("Criticism. Hispanic-American Philosophy Magazine") since 1967, with Luis Villoro and Fernando Salmerón.

He was also a writer and member of the editing board for the magazine Plural, where he also had a column from 1973 to 1976.

In addition to his work for Plural, Rossi also wrote supplemental articles on culture for the newspaper Excélsior which, at the time, was headed by the poet Octavio Paz and under the editorship of Julio Scherer García. In 1976, the newspaper was subdued by members of the Institutional Revolutionary Party (PRI) led by President Luis Echeverría Álvarez — due to the newspaper's views against his administration — leaving Rossi to follow Paz and his coworkers in founding the literary review Vuelta of which Rossi served as the interim director for a few months. From there, Rossi became part of the review's editing board until the very last day of publication in 1998. He also had a column in the magazine.Vuelta received the Prince of Asturias Award (Spanish: Premio Príncipe de Asturias de Comunicación y Humanidades) in 1993.

Rossi was a frequent collaborator to the magazines Letras Libres and La Gaceta del Fondo de Cultura Económica.

In 1983, Rossi was invited to attend St. Anthony's College at the University of Oxford in Great Britain.

He died in Mexico City on June 5, 2009. A memorial service was held for him on June 7 at the Palace of Fine Arts.

== Works ==
Manual del distraído (Manual of the Absent-minded) (1978) looks at how distraction shapes our lives. It's based on some of Alejandro's earlier magazine and newspaper articles. Through short, fragmented reflections, Rossi explores ideas of attention and existence, with a humorous tone. It's often considered his masterpiece.

La Fábula de las Regiones ("The Legend of the Regions") (1997) is a reflective and imaginative work that blends fiction with philosophical ideas. Through its storytelling, Rossi explores the concept of different "regions", both physical and mental, questioning how we define and experience our surroundings.

Another well-known work of is Lenguaje y significado ("Language and Meaning") (1968), a more philosophical one.

In 1989, Rossi edited and wrote the foreword for the anthology José Gaos: Filosofía de la Filosofía ("José Gaos: The Philosophy of Philosophy") (Crítica) and also collaborated with various foreign others in books like Philosophie und Rechtstheorie in Mexiko (Duncker & Humblot, Berlín, 1989) and Philosophical Analysis in Latin America (Jorge J. E. Gracia et al., 1984).

In a volume written in collaboration with other authors (FCE, 1984, 1996), Rossi paid homage to one of mainstays of his form of thought, José Ortega y Gasset.

Edén: Vida imaginada (FCE, 2006) was his last book. In it, the idea of paradise is explored in a contemplative and poetic form. Rossi reflects on themes of existence, desire, and the search for meaning, using the concept of The Garden of Eden as a metaphor for human longing and the complexity of life. The book combines philosophical insights with imagery. It won the Xavier Villaurrutia Award in 2007.

His works have been translated to English, German, French and Italian.

=== Other Books ===
- Sueños de Occam (Occam's Dreams) (UNAM, 1982)
- Diario de guerra (1994)
- El Cielo de Sotero (1987)
- Cartas credenciales (1999)
- Un café con Gorrondona (1999)
- Obras reunidas (2005)

== Awards and distinctions ==
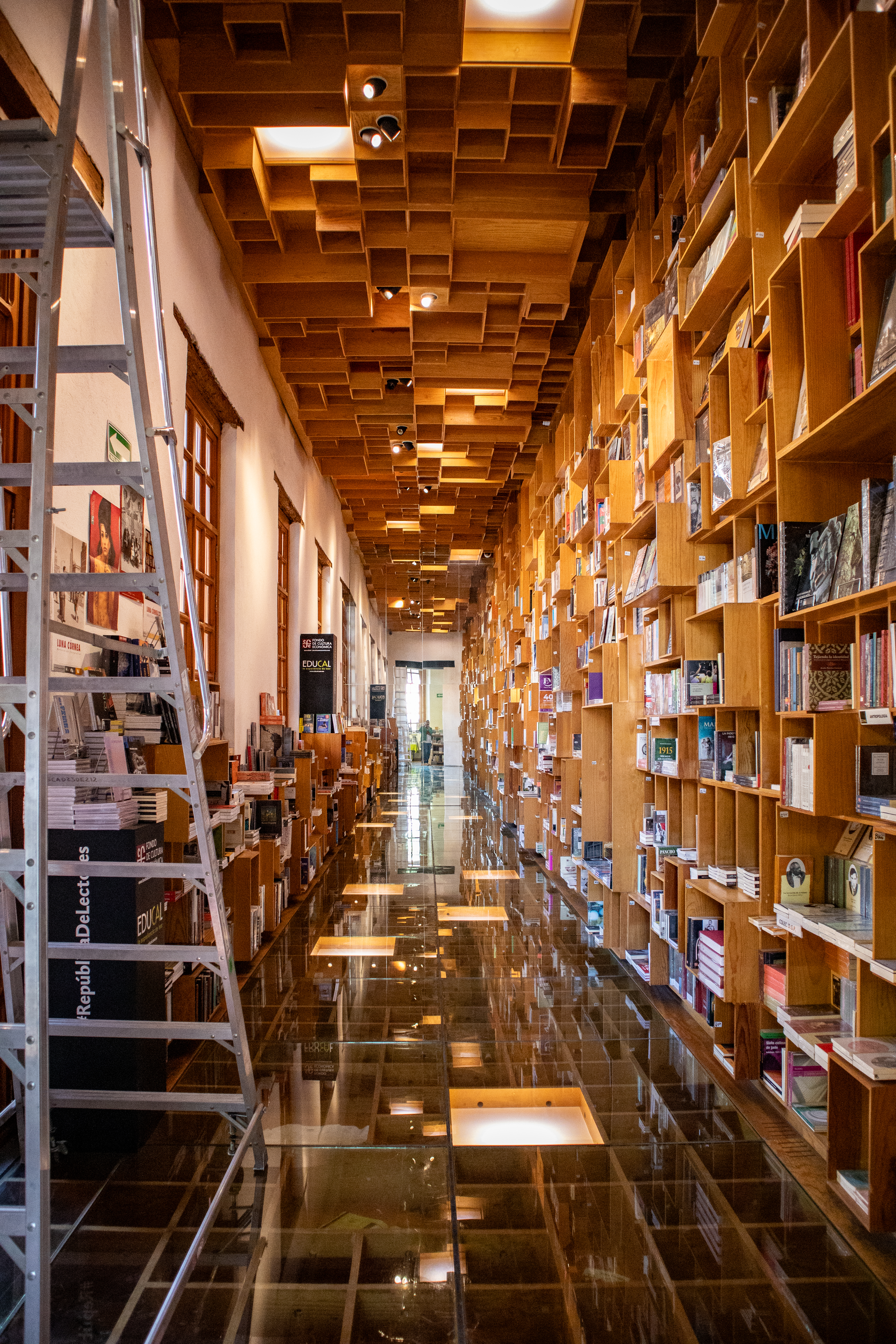
The bookstore at the Biblioteca de México José Vasconcelos is named after him.

- Rockefeller Foundation scholarship in 1960 and 1961.
- Guggenheim Fellowship in 1985.
- Order of the Aztec Eagle by the Mexican government in 1988.
- Member of the governing board of the Fondo de Cultura Económica since 1989.
- Creator Emeritus in the Sistema Nacional de Creadores de Arte (National System of Art Creators) since 1993.
- República de Venezuela Order of Andrés Bello in 1996.
- Member of El Colegio Nacional since 1996.
- Member of the governing board of El Colegio de México from 1997 to 2005.
- National Prize for Arts in the Linguistics and literature category by the Mexican government in 1999.
- Premio Universidad Nacional in the 'artistic creation and culture advancement' category by the National Autonomous University of Mexico in 2000.
- Doctor honoris causa by the Universidad Nacional Autónoma de México in 2001.
- 'Commander by Number' of the Order of Isabella the Catholic by the government of Spain in 2002.
- Doctor honoris causa by the Universidad Central de Venezuela in 2005.
- Xavier Villaurrutia Award for his novel Edén. Vida imaginada in 2007.

== See also ==
- List of Guggenheim Fellowships awarded in 1985
