= Luciano Spano =

Mexican painter (born 1959)

Luciano Biagio Spano Tancredi (born July 20, 1959, in Saluzzo, Cuneo, Italy) is a Mexican painter.

Luciano Spano arrived in Mexico at the age of fourteen, in 1974. He enrolled from the Escuela Nacional de Pintura, Escultura y Grabado "La Esmeralda", which he attended from 1977 to 1984, in Mexico City. He also attended the Escuela Nacional de Artes Plásticas of the UNAM. Spano has received various recognitions for his paintings, which can be found in many art museums in Mexico.

He lives in Mexico.
