= Fabio Morábito =

Mexican writer and poet (born 1955)

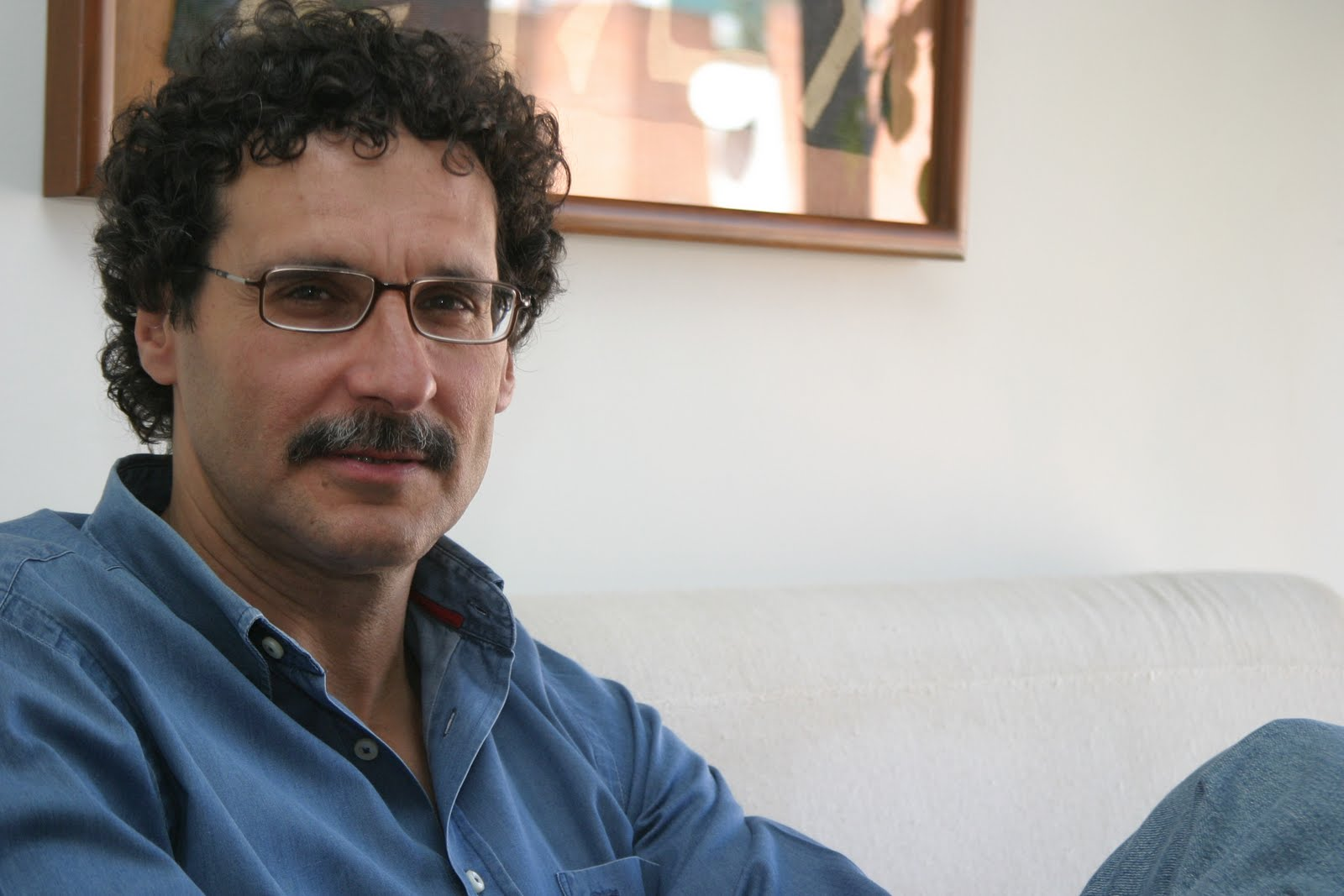
- Morábito in 2017
- Born: February 21, 1955 (age 71); Alexandria, Egypt
- Occupations: Writer and poet

Fabio Morábito (born February 21, 1955, in Alexandria, Egypt) is a Mexican writer and poet.

Born in Egypt to Italian parents, he spent his childhood in Milan. Since the age of 14 he has lived in Mexico City where he has written four books of poetry in Spanish, including Lotes baldíos (which won the 1995 'Carlos Pellicer Prize'), De lunes todo el año (which won the 'Aguascalientes National Prize for Poetry' in 1991) and Alguien de lava (2011); two books of prose, Caja de herramientas (1989) and "El idioma materno" (2014); three collections of short stories, La lenta furia (1989), La vida ordenada (2000) and Grieta de fatiga (which won the 'Antonin Artaud Prize' in 2006); and two books of essays, El viaje y la enfermedad (1984) and Los pastores sin ovejas (1996). He has also written a children's book, Cuando las panteras no eran negras, which won the 'White Raven Prize' in 1997. He has compiled and retold a book of 125 oral Mexican short stories, "Cuentos populares mexicanos" (2014), which won the 'White Raven Prize' in 2015. His novel El lector a domicilio (2018) was awarded the Xavier Villaurrutia Award and was translated into English in 2021. He has translated from his mother tongue, Italian, numerous stories, poems, essays and children's books. In 1998, he took part in a DAAD artists programme in Berlin. He wrote the story series También Berlín se olvida about this experience. In 2005 Galaxia Gutenberg published his translation of the complete poetry of Eugenio Montale.

== Bibliography ==
- Sarah Pollack and Tamara R. Williams (compilors), "Los oficios del nómada: Fabio Morábito ante la crítica" (2015)
- Snodgrass, Kathleen (May 1, 2007). "Introduction: Fabio Morabito". Northwest Review. Archived from the original on November 5, 2012 – via HighBeam Research.
- "Morábito, Fabio" (in Spanish). Tusquets Editores. *"Fabio MORABITO" (in French). Sentre National du Livre. 2009.
- "Fabio Morábito" (in French). Salon du livre Paris.
- Rafael Lemus (July 2009). "Emilio, los chistes y la muerte, de Fabio Morábito" (in Spanish). Letras libres. (book review)
