= Instituto Politécnico Nacional =

University in Mexico

National Polytechnic Institute
- Instituto Politécnico Nacional
- Official Seal
- Motto: La Técnica al Servicio de la Patria
- Motto in English: The Technique at the Service of the Fatherland
- Type: Public
- Established: 1 January 1936
- Founders: Juan de Dios Bátiz Paredes and Lázaro Cárdenas del Río
- Academic affiliations: AMECYD, ANUIES, AUIP, CLARA, COMEPO, CUDI, ECOES, OUI, UDUAL, Universia
- Director: Arturo Reyes Sandoval
- Academic staff: 16,445 (as of 2022)
- Administrative staff: 9,144 (as of 2022)
- Students: 216,274 (as of 2022)
- Undergraduates: 135,558 (as of 2022)
- Postgraduates: 6,282 (as of 2022)
- Other students: 74,434 (high school) (as of 2022)
- Location: Mexico City, Mexico; 19°30′02″N 99°08′23″W
- Campus: Several across Mexico, mostly urban
- Colors: Maroon and white
- Nickname: Burros Blancos
- Sporting affiliations: ONEFA Central Conference
- Mascot: White donkey
- Website: www.ipn.mx

The National Polytechnic Institute (Spanish: Instituto Politécnico Nacional), abbreviated IPN, is one of the largest public universities in Mexico with 171,581 students at the high school, undergraduate and postgraduate levels. It was ranked third in Mexico, behind Tecnológico de Monterrey and UNAM and 246th in the Engineering and Technology category in 2025 by QS World University Rankings. It was founded on 1 January 1936 during the administration of President Lázaro Cárdenas.

The institute consists of 98 academic units offering 290 courses of study. It includes 57 technical careers, 79 undergraduate and 154 postgraduate programs. Its main campus, called 'Unidad Profesional Adolfo López Mateos' or 'Zacatenco', located in northern Mexico City, covers approximately 530 acres (2.1 km^{2}) .

The IPN is based primarily in Mexico City, but with several research institutes and facilities distributed over 22 states.

== History ==
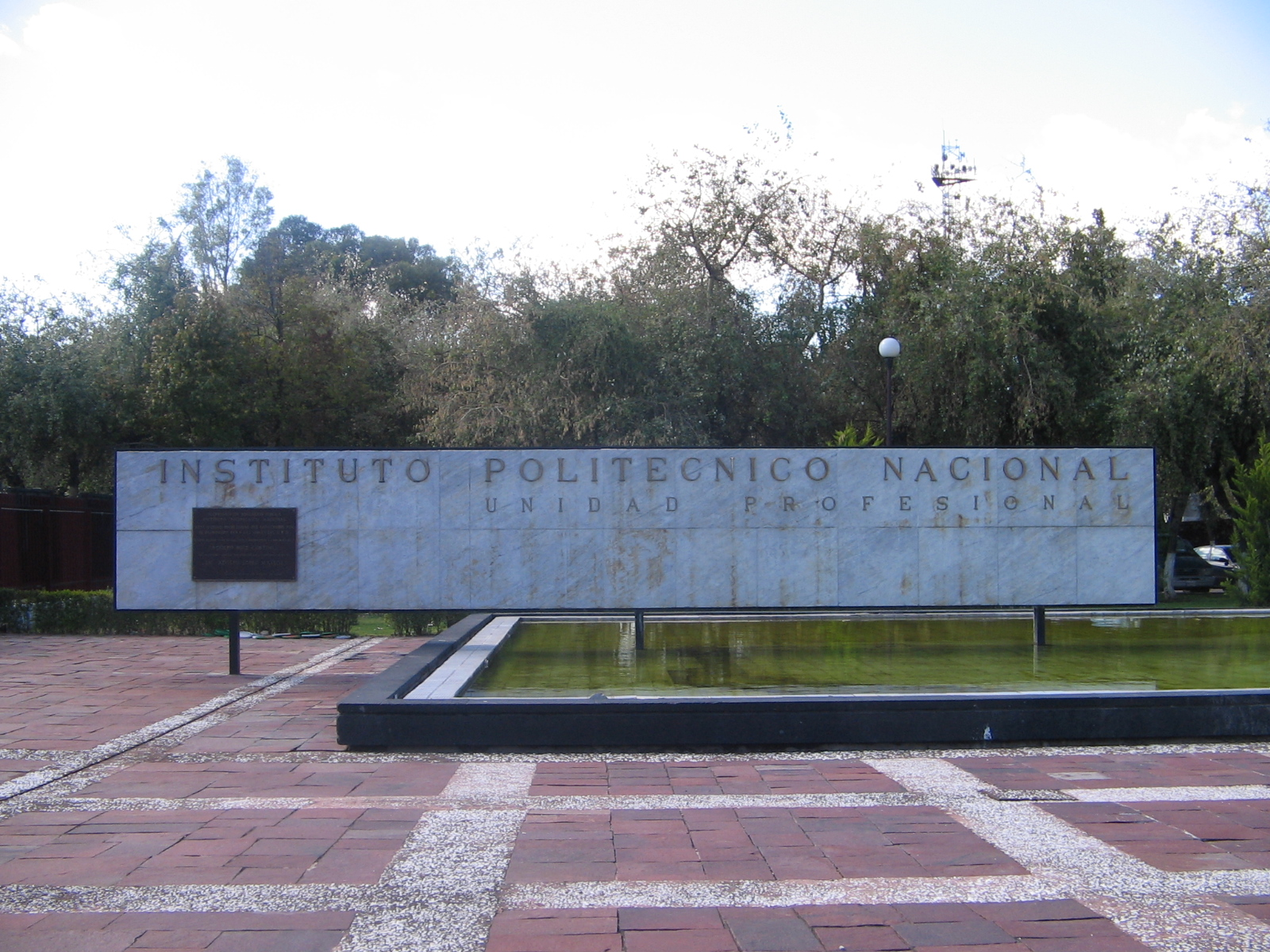
Marquee at the main entrance of the Adolfo López Mateos campus

The institute was founded on January 1, 1936, during the administration of President Lázaro Cárdenas in what had been previously known as the Ex hacienda Santo Tomás — a large estate initially owned by Spanish conqueror Hernán Cortés in the 16th century and donated by the federal government.

Prominent astronomer Luis Enrique Erro, former revolutionary Juan de Dios Bátiz Paredes and former minister of education Narciso Bassols were among its initial promoters.

During the administration of former director Alejo Peralta sufficient lands were given to IPN. Expropriated lands of Santa Maria Ticomán (213 ha) and San Pedro Zacatenco (43 ha) were used.

The construction of what is now the Professional Unit "Adolfo López Mateos" (Zacatenco) began in 1958. In 1959, former President Adolfo López Mateos, the former minister of education Jaime Torres Bodet, and former director of IPN Eugenio Mendez Docurro, inaugurated the first four buildings of Zacatenco, which were occupied by the Superior School of Mechanical and Electrical Engineering (ESIME) and the Superior School of Engineering and Architecture (ESIA).

== Organization ==
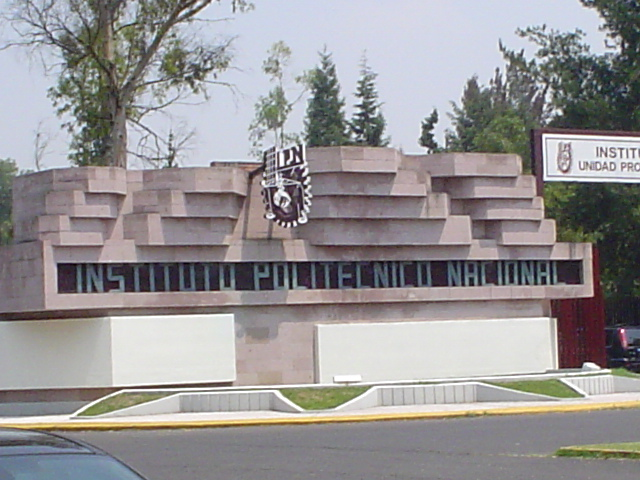
IPN entrance

The institute is organized around 98 academic units including 18 vocational high schools (operates as CECyT), 26 university colleges, 20 scientific and technical research centers, 17 continuing education centers, 4 units for educational support, 3 support units for education innovation, 8 support units for research, development and technological and enterprise foment, and 2 units affiliated to science, enterprise research and development.

University rankings

Global – Overall
- QS World: 851-900 (2026)

These schools are primarily in Mexico City, although several extension and research facilities are distributed over 22 states.

Some units (particularly the semi-autonomous, internationally renowned CINVESTAV) enjoy a high degree of academic and budgetary freedom. The institute as a whole is headed by a director-general appointed by the President of Mexico, usually (but not always) after some consultation with members of its academic community. Since December 2020, its director-general has been Arturo Reyes Sandoval.

In addition to its academic endeavors, and as part of its cultural promotion strategy, the institute operates 'Canal Once' ('Channel Eleven'), the oldest public broadcast service in Latin America featuring original cultural, scientific, information and entertainment programming, foreign shows and classic, rare, and non-commercial films from all over the world.

== Academics ==
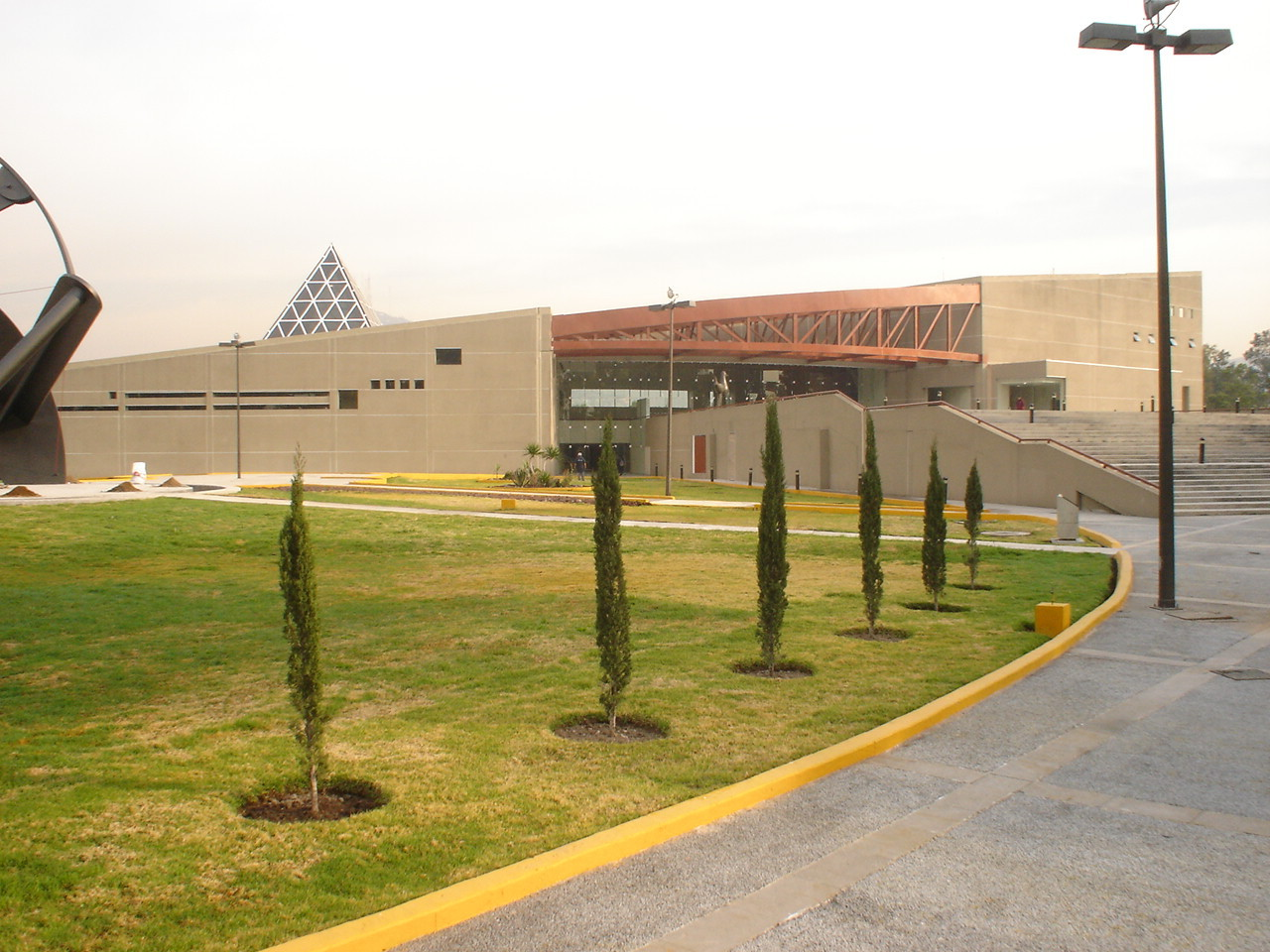
One of the schools of the National Polytechnic Institute specializing in business studies.

The institute offers 80 undergraduate programs leading to four- or five-year bachelor's degrees and 135 postgraduate programs leading to 29 postgraduate diplomas, 70 master's degrees and 36 doctorate degrees.

Like most public universities in Mexico, in addition to its undergraduate and graduate schools the institute sponsors several vocational high schools called 'Centros de Estudios Científicos y Tecnológicos' (C.E.C. y T.), most of which are in Greater Mexico City. Upon completion, they lead to a technician degree. For this level of study, the institute offers 78 technical careers.

== Athletics ==
IPN fields 27 varsity teams in sports or activities such as archery, American football, athletics, baseball, basketball, body building, bowling, boxing, chess, cycling, frontenis, gymnastics, handball, indoor soccer, judo, karate, kendo, mountaineering, rowing, soccer, swimming, taekwondo, tennis, touch football, volleyball, weightlifting, and wrestling.

The university maintains a fierce rivalry with all the athletic teams from the National Autonomous University of Mexico (UNAM); it has a particularly bitter competition with UNAM's football program, the "Pumas Dorados" (Golden Pumas).

== Notable people ==
=== Notable alumni ===
==== Scientists and technologists ====
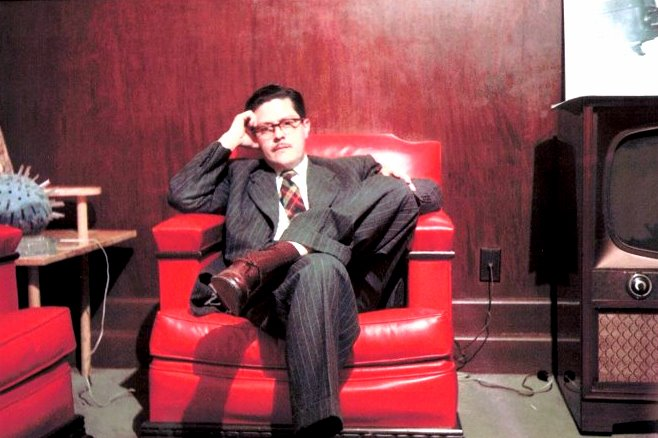
Guillermo González Camarena

- Guillermo González Camarena: television pioneer; inventor of an early color television transmission system.
- Jerzy Rzedowski: plant scientist; pioneer of neotropical floristics.
- Esther Orozco: biology researcher, winner of the 1997 UNESCO/Institut Pasteur Medal and the 2006 L'Oréal-UNESCO Awards for Women in Science for her work on amoebiasis.
- Evangelina Villegas: biochemist laureated with the 2000 World Food Prize and whose work with maize led to the development of Quality Protein Maize (QPM).
- Pablo Rudomín: neuroscientist laureated with the Prince of Asturias Award (1987).
- Gilberto Calvillo Vives: president of the United Nations' Statistics Commission.
- Alberto Pérez Gómez: architectural historian and winner of the 1984 Alice Davis Hitchcock Award.
- Ruth Rivera Marin: architect, the first woman to study architecture at the College of Engineering and Architecture.
- Constantino Reyes-Valerio: chemist and art historian, discovered the recipe to create Maya blue and coined the term Arte Indocristiano.
- Raúl Rojas: professor of computer science and mathematics and a renowned specialist in artificial neural networks.

==== Politicians ====
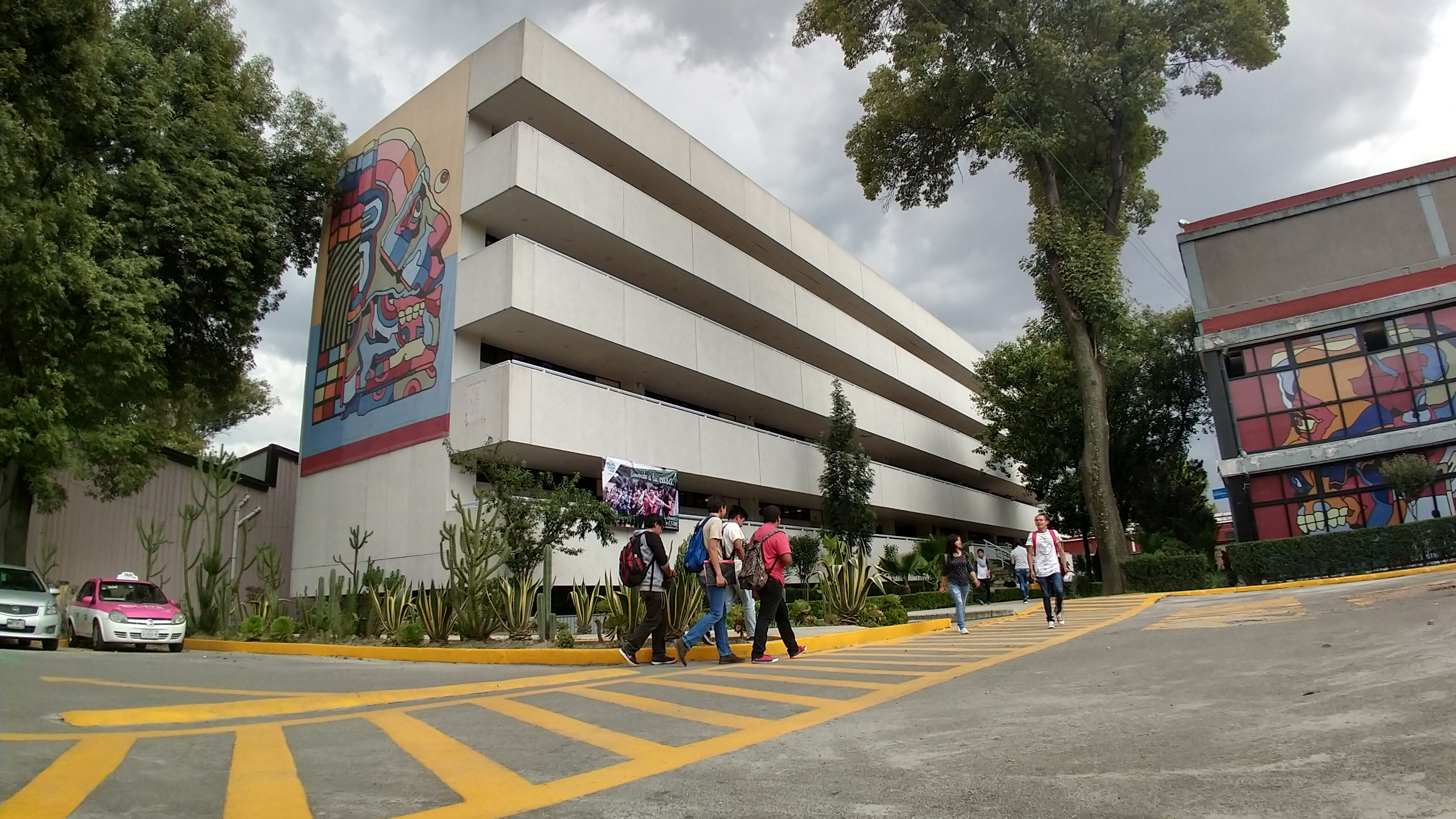
Azcapotzalco

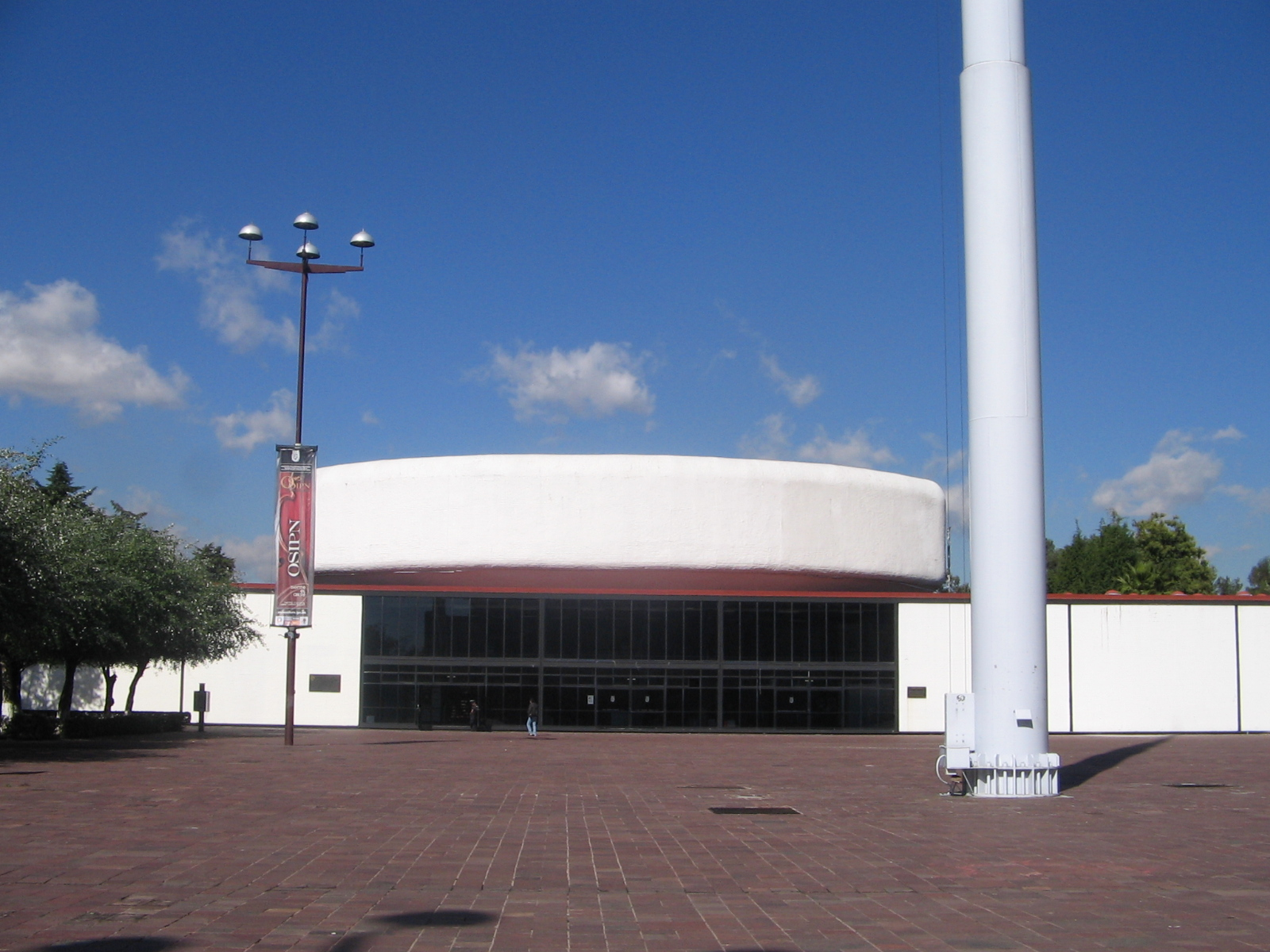
Cultural center Jaime Torres Bodet

- Ernesto Zedillo: former President of Mexico (1994-2000)
- Josefina Vázquez Mota: former Secretary of Education (Mexico)
- Reyes Tamez: Secretary of Education during the Fox administration
- Victor Bravo Ahuja: Secretary of Education during the Echeverría administration
- Eugenio Méndez Docurro: Secretariat of Communications and Transportation during the Echeverría administration
- Héctor Mayagoitia Domínguez: former Governor of Durango (1974-1979)
- Miguel Borge Martín: former Governor of Quintana Roo (1987-1993)
- Roberto Kobeh González: ICAO Council President (2006-2014)
- Luis Montes de Oca: former Secretary of Finance (Mexico) 1927–1932

=== Notable faculty ===
- Alexander Balankin: scientist, winner of the 2005 UNESCO Science Prize for his works on fractal mechanics.
- Heberto Castillo: inventor of tridilosa and founder of several political parties.
- Juan O'Gorman: architect and painter.
- Arturo Rosenblueth: physician, physiologist, and noted researcher.

== See also ==
- National Polytechnic Institute College of Engineering and Physical-Mathematic Sciences
- National Polytechnic Institute College of Biomedical Sciences
- National Polytechnic Institute College of Social and Administrative Sciences
- National Polytechnic Institute College of Interdisciplinary Studies
