= Ruth Rivera Marín =

Mexican architect (1927–1969)

- Ruth Rivera Marín
- Born: Ruth María Rivera Marín; 18 June 1927; Mexico City, Mexico
- Died: 15 December 1969 (aged 42); Mexico City, Mexico
- Other name: Ruth Rivera de Coronel
- Occupation: Architect
- Years active: 1959–1969
- Spouse: Rafael Coronel
- Children: 3
- Parent(s): Diego Rivera; Guadalupe Marín

Ruth María Rivera Marín (18 June 1927 – 15 December 1969) was a Mexican architect. Her professional experience centered on teaching, institutional management, theory and practice related to architecture. She was the first woman student of the College of Engineering and Architecture at the National Polytechnic Institute.

== Biography ==
Ruth María Rivera Marín was born in Mexico City on 18 June 1927 to parents Diego Rivera, a prominent Mexican muralist, and Guadalupe Marín Preciado, a model, seamstress and writer. Her elder sister was Guadalupe Rivera Marín. She completed her primary education at the Escuela Alberto Correa and finished her secondary education at Secondary School N° 8. Rivera was the first woman to study architecture at the College of Engineering and Architecture of the National Polytechnic Institute and graduated in 1950 with the degree title of engineer-architect. Simultaneously with her studies at the College of Engineering and Architecture (ESIA), Rivera studied dance with Waldeen Falkenstein and acting with Seki Sano and appeared in stage productions. She married Pedro Alvarado Castanon, the President of the Instituto Politécnico Nacional, with whom she had two children: Pedro Diego and Ruth María. Following Alvarado's death, she married Rafael Coronel, a Mexican painter. They had a son, Juan Rafael.

In 1947, Rivera began teaching visual arts at the teachers' training college and at La Esmeralda School of Painting and Sculpture. She participated in the Social Service Brigades of 1948, doing her public service in Celaya, Guanajuato, and drafting a master plan for the city before heading to Italy in 1950 for further studies. She studied urban rehabilitation at the Institute of Restoration in Rome for two years. After her graduation, Rivera returned to Mexico and began teaching in 1952 at EISA. She taught subjects related to theory of architecture, architectural composition workshop planning, and urban and planning theory. During the early years of her career, she also pursued in subjects such as literature, anthropology, theater, dance, and fine arts. Through interactions with her father, Juan O'Gorman, Pedro Ramirez Vazquez, and Enrique Yáñez, she developed her intellectual beliefs and nationalist ideas.

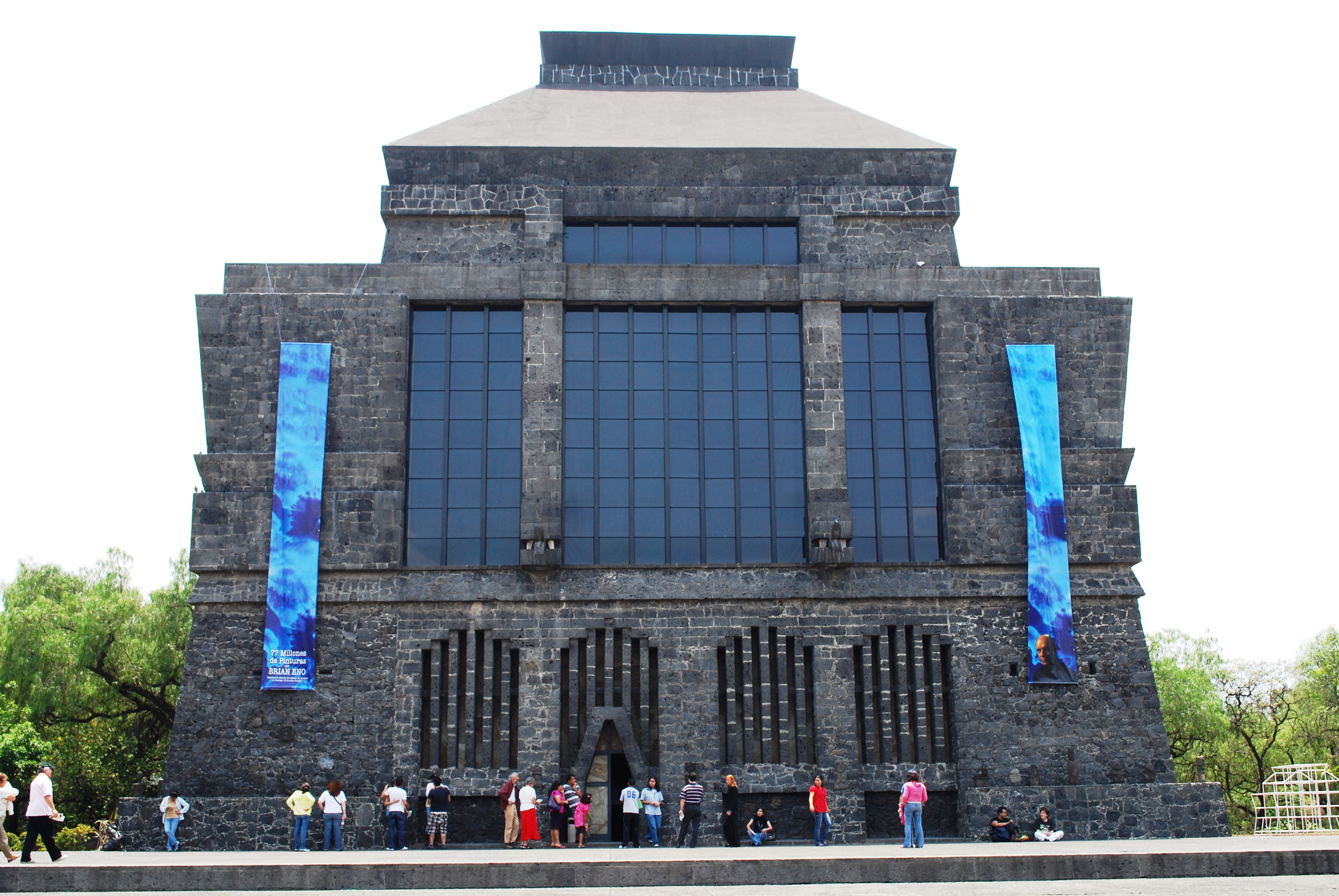
Anahuacalli Museum in Coyoacán.

From the early 1960s to 1964, Rivera was head of planning for the SEP on the National System of Regional Rural Schools. Rivera was involved with the building of the National Medical Center (Spanish: Centro Médico Nacional). She worked on the Museum of Modern Art Chapultepec in close collaboration with Pedro Ramírez Vázquez. Rivera also worked with Luis Barragán on the Museum "El Eco" in Mexico City. Her most noted work was the creation of the Anahuacalli Museum in Coyoacán in association with her father, Diego Rivera, and Juan O'Gorman. In 1962, she designed the Mexican Pavilion for the Century 21 Fair in Seattle alongside Carlos Mijares Bracho. She was a delegate in the 1964 International Architects Congress held in Budapest.

She was the head of the Architecture Departments at the Instituto Nacional de Bellas Artes from 1959 to 1969 (which ran the Museo Nacional de Artes Plásticas at the Palacio de Bellas Artes). However, she had been involved with INBA almost since its foundation, assisting Enrique Yáñez in archiving Mexico's modern architecture.

Rivera published many articles and books. She managed the Journal Cuadernos de Arquitectura y Conservación del Patrimonio Artístico of the INBA, which initially had a supplement called the Cuadernos de Arquitectura (Notebook of Architecture). The Notebook became a separate publication under Rivera and evolved into "one of the most important publishing projects for the Institute" discussing both technical and artistic components of architecture. Though its publication lasted only from 1961 to 1967, its theoretical and practical significance and value as the basis for teaching spurred an effort concluded in 2014 to collect all 20 volumes and digitize them as a lasting reference.

Rivera died on 15 December 1969 in Mexico City. Posthumously, the Architecture Center at INBA was renamed in her honor.

== Memberships ==
Rivera was a member of many institutions. Some of her active work in both national and international organizations were in the College of Architects of Mexico, the Mexican Society of Architects, the Mexican Association of Art Critics, and ICOMOS, the Subcommittee on UNESCO Museums. She served as the President of the International Union of Women Architects.

== Selected Architectural works ==
- 1954 reconstruction of Teatro de la República, Querétaro, Mexico
- 1959–60 Hall of Mexican Visual Arts (Spanish: Salón de la Plástica Mexicana), INBA, Mexico City
- 1959–60 collaboration with architect Manuel de la Parra on repurposing the Prison of Dolores Hidalgo into the Regional Artesan's Museum and Cultural Center
- 1959–60 repurposing the former Convent San Miguel de Allende as the Cultural Center Ignacio Ramírez
- 1961–62 collaboration with Guillermo Rossell, to convert the former home of Aquiles Serdán into the Museo de la Revolución, Puebla City, Mexico
- 1961–64 collaboration with Ramiro González del Sordo for the campus of the School for Design and Crafts
- 1961–64 Teatro Comonfort
- 1961–64 collaboration with Pedro Ramírez Vázquez on the Museum of Modern Art, Chapultepec
- 1961–64 collaboration with René Martínez Ostos on the Teatro de Comedia Jiménez Rueda of INBA, Mexico City
- 1965–67 restoration work on Escuela Nacional de Pintura, Escultura y Grabado "La Esmeralda", Mexico City
- 1967 collaboration with Ramiro González del Sordo and Jorge Luna to convert the Palace of the Count of Buenavista into the San Carlos Museum of European Painting
- 1969 House of Culture in Aguascalientes City, Mexico

== Selected publications ==
- Rivera, Ruth (1963). Arquitectura y planificación de Jalisco (in Spanish). Distrito Federal: Instituto Nacional de Bellas Artes, Departamento de Arquitectura.
- Rivera, Ruth (1965). "La Ciudad de las Artes". Artes de México (in Spanish). 65 (64): 15–18. ISSN 0300-4953.
- Rivera, Ruth (1966). New Architecture in Mexico. Washington, DC: Pan American Union.
- Rivera, Ruth (1989). Ruth Rivera: espacios de difusión arquitectónica (in Spanish). Distrito Federal: Consejo Nacional para la Cultura y las Artes.
- Rivera de Coronel, Ruth (1972). "Commentary concerning the remodelling of the urban centre of Mexico city". Il monumento per l'uomo. Padova: 912–913. OCLC 908495777.
- Rivera de Coronel, Ruth (1972). "The protection of the artistic and cultural patrimony in Mexico". Il monumento per l'uomo. Padova: 667–668. OCLC 908495508.

== Bibliography ==
- Goeritz, Mathias (Spring 1955). "Emotional Architecture: El Eco". Dimension. 1 (1). Ann Arbor, Michigan: UM Libraries. UOM:39015025999981.
- Lajoie, Lucien F. (1972). Who's Notable in Mexico. Who's Who in Mexico.
- Ríos Garza, Carlos (2014). Revista arquitectura México 119 números, 1938–1978 (PDF) (in Spanish) (Ed. digital. ed.). México, D.F.: Facultad de Arquitectura, Universidad Nacional Autónoma de México. ISBN 970-32-2347-8.
- Tibol, Raquel (1993). Frida Kahlo. UNM Press. ISBN 978-0-8263-2188-6.
