= Antiguo Real Hospital de San Juan de Dios =

Part of a World Heritage site in Mexico

The Old Royal Hospital of San Juan de Dios El Antiguo Real Hospital de San Juan de Dios
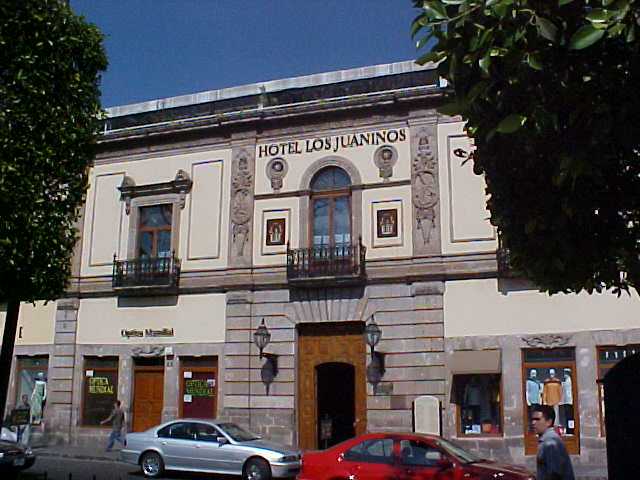
- Antiguo Real Hospital de San Juan de Dios

Geography
- Location: Morelia, Michoacán, Mexico
- Coordinates: 19°42′9″N 101°11′29″W

History
- Construction started: 1685
- Opened: 18th Century
- Closed: 1866

Links
- Lists: Hospitals in Mexico

El Antiguo Real Hospital de San Juan de Dios (English: The Old Royal Hospital of San Juan de Dios) is a historical building built in the 17th century in Morelia, Michoacán, Mexico. Its design combines Baroque and neoclassical architectural styles. With a long history, first as a Bishop's House, then as a hospital, and later as a hotel, it is an important example of the architecture of that period and an important tourist attraction for the city of Morelia.

== History ==
The building was constructed in 1685 by Juan de Ortega y Montañés, a bishop of Michoacán, to be used as a Bishop's House.

Facing criticism from the community for its exaggerated luxury, in the early 18th century it was ceded to the Juanino monks in order to establish the Hospital Real de San José, later known as the Real Hospital de San Juan de Dios. In 1794 the religious authorities of San Juan de Dios took possession of the hospital.

In 1830, the doctor Juan Manuel González Ureña created the state of Michoacán's first chair of medicine in this building, which led to the creation of the Escuela de Medicina de Michoacán in 1865.

In 1866, the building was converted into a hotel and was known for several decades as the Hotel Oseguera. In 1886 it was remodeled by the engineer Guillermo Woodon de Sorine. In 1998 its name was changed to Hotel Los Juaninos, in memory of the monks who used it as a hospital.

The two faces that make up the front of the building are very similar in appearance. It is flanked on both sides by local commercial buildings. Inside, the arches surrounding the main patio and on the upper floor are supported by Tuscan-style stonework columns.

== See also ==
- Francisco Javier Balmis
