= National Polytechnic Institute College of Biomedical Sciences =

Institute of higher education in Mexico

College of Biomedical Sciences
- Parent institution: National Polytechnic Institute

The College of Biomedical Sciences of the National Polytechnic Institute is an institute of higher education in Mexico. The College was proposed in 1932 by Secretary of Public Education Narciso Bassols. Currently the College is divided in two Superior Schools and two National Schools:

== National School of Biological Sciences ==
- ENCB "Escuela Nacional de Ciencias Biológicas"

== National School of Medicine and Homeopathy ==
- ENMyH "Escuela Nacional de Medicina y Homeopatía"

== Superior School of Medicine ==
- ESM "Escuela Superior de Medicina"

== Superior School of Nursing ==
- ESEyO "Escuela Superior de Enfermería y Obstetricia"
