= XXI Century National Medical Center =

- Mexican Social Security Institute
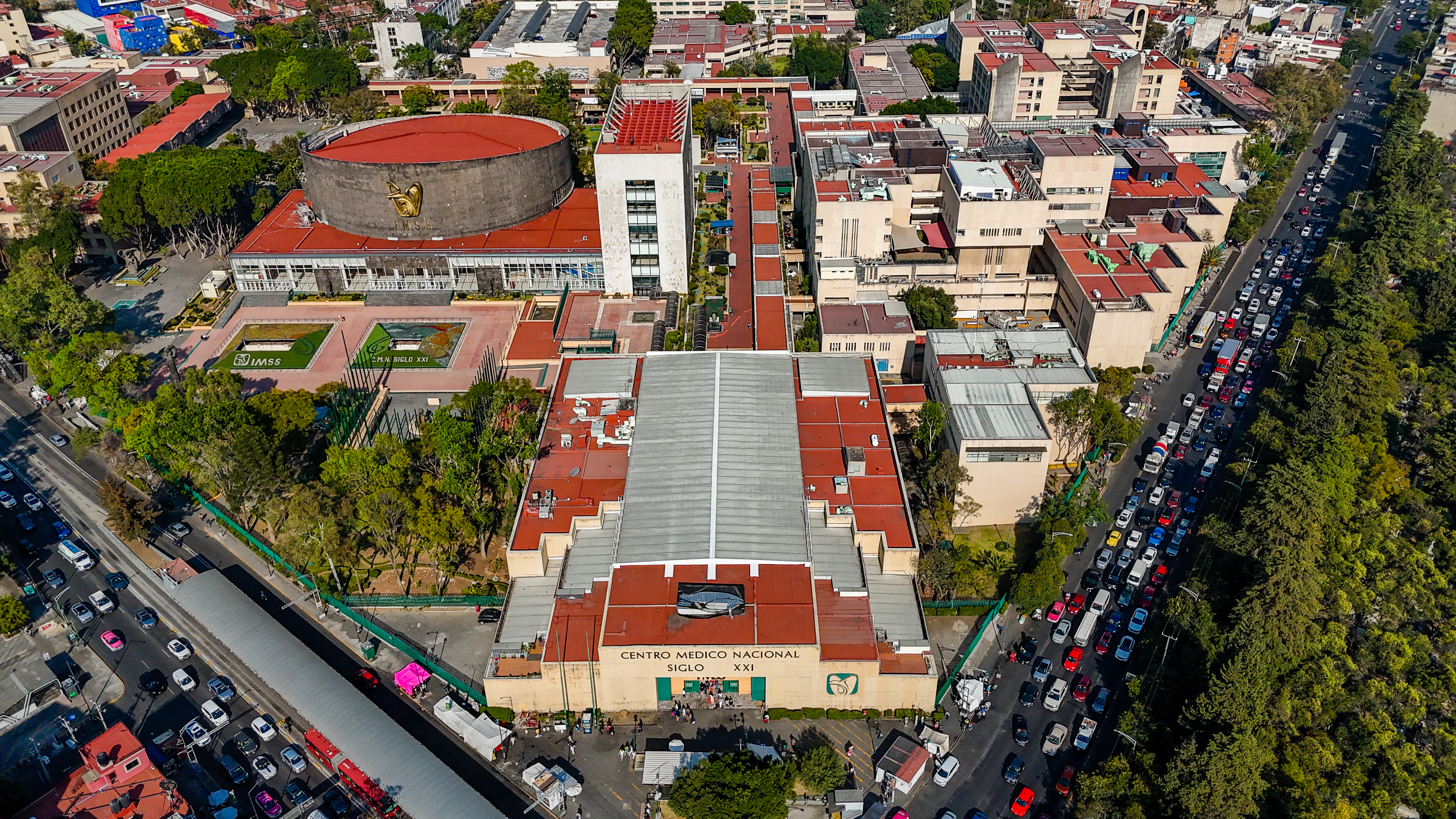

Geography
- Location: Colonia Doctores neighborhood, Mexico City, Mexico
- Coordinates: 19°24′26″N 99°09′16″W

History
- Opened: 1961

Links
- Lists: Hospitals in Mexico

XXI Century National Medical Center (Spanish: Centro Médico Nacional Siglo XXI) is a hospital complex located in the Colonia Doctores neighborhood of Mexico City. It was inaugurated in May 1961 and is managed by the Mexican Social Security Institute (IMSS). It is part of a conglomerate of health buildings that includes the General Hospital of Mexico (administered by the Secretariat of Health) and the Federico Gómez Children's Hospital, both adjoining the medical center.

The complex contains a cardiology hospital, traumatology and orthopedics hospital, obstetrics-gynecology hospital, oncology hospital, and a pediatrics hospital. The mission of the hospital is medical care, teaching, and research.

== History ==
The history of XXI Century National Medical Center can be divided in four stages. The first stage began in the late 1930s, which was the conception, planning and construction of the Centro Médico del Distrito Federal (Medical Center of the Federal District) belonging to the Secretaría de Salubridad y Asistencia (Ministry of Health and Assistance). The second stage was when the IMSS acquired the center and started operations in 1963, and lasted through 1985, when there was reconstruction of the center following devastating damage from the 1985 Mexico City earthquake. The third stage began in 1989, when several new or different buildings augmented or replaced the structures damaged or destroyed by the earthquake. The fourth stage began in 2004, when the four hospitals of the Center were categorized as Unidades Médicas de Alta Especialidad (High Specialized Medical Units).
