= Hospital del Divino Salvador =

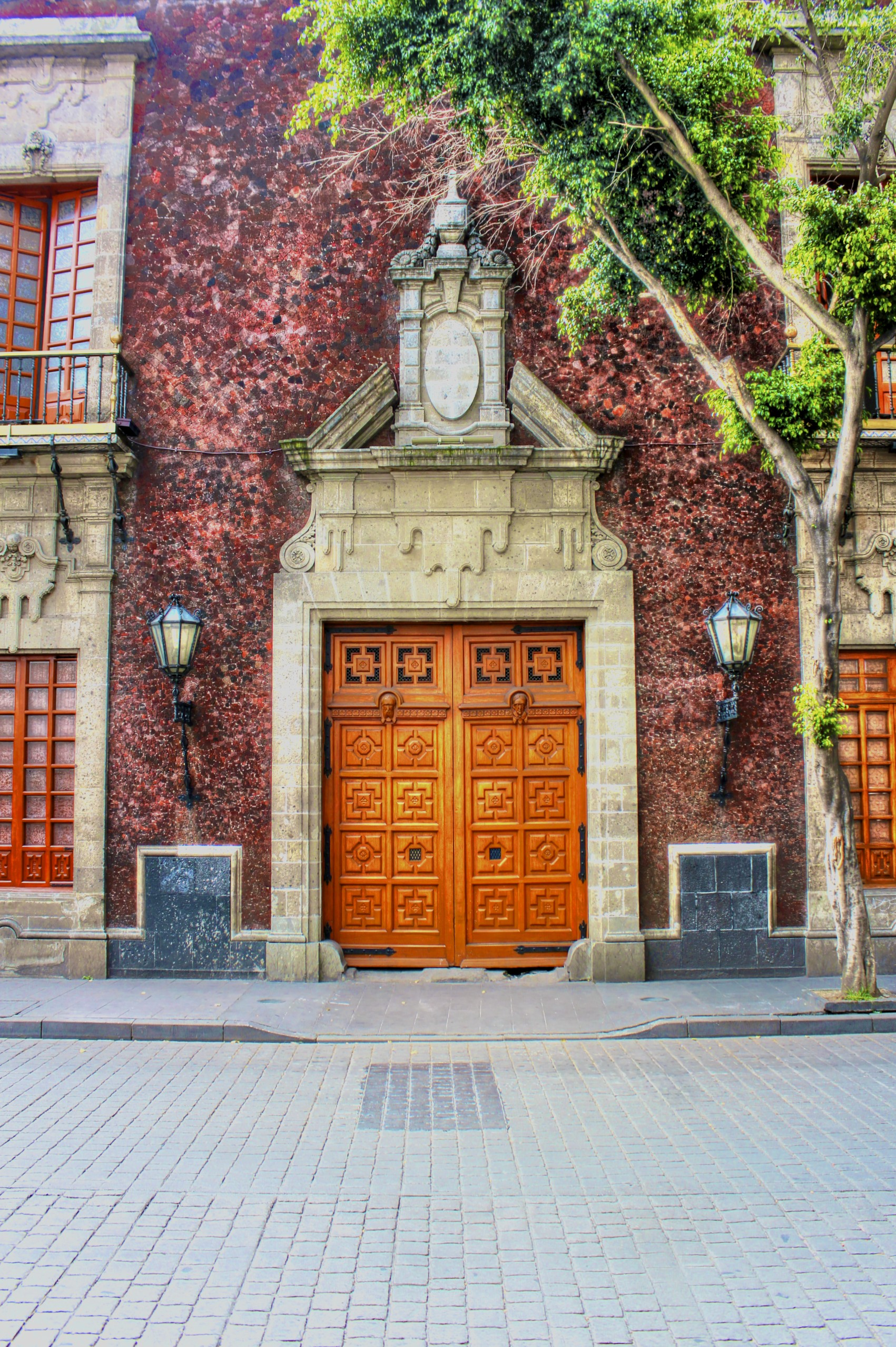

Geography
- Location: Donceles street, Historic center of Mexico City, Mexico
- Coordinates: 19.436407°N 99.135863°W (approximate)

Organisation
- Type: Specialist
- Specialty: Psychiatric hospital

History
- Opened: 1687
- Closed: 1910

Links
- Lists: Hospitals in Mexico

The Hospital del Divino Salvador was the first hospital established in Mexico City for the treatment of mentally ill women.

== History ==
It was founded by José de Sáyago and archbishop Francisco de Aguiar y Seijas by the year of 1687. By the death of the archbishop, the hospital, was sponsored by El Divino Salvador congregation. This congregation was founded in La Casa Profesa of the Society of Jesus.

The congregation moved the hospital's premises to a better location, in this case a house at La Canoa street (Donceles street) by the year 1700. The congregation maintained the hospital as one of the best of its kind in the treatment of mentally ill women. By the Suppression of the Society of Jesus in 1767 the hospital became part of the Real Patronato, nevertheless the quality of the services given at the hospital were never the same as the ones given by the jesuits.

In the early 19th century, the Viceroy Felix Berenguer de Marquina decided to redesign the hospital's premises. This works would be completed in 1809. By the independence of Nueva España the hospital passed into the hands of the City and in 1847 to the care of the Sisters of Charity.

In the year 1910 the women at the hospital were moved to the new General Asylum "la Castañeda". The new hospital built under the leadership of Porfirio Díaz in the framework for the celebrations for the first centenary of the Independence of Mexico.

Currently the building houses offices of the Secretary of Health and the historical record of the institution. The building is still standing in Donceles street at the Historic center of Mexico City.

== Sources ==
- Muriel, Josefina. “El modelo arquitectónico de los hospitales para dementes en la Nueva España”, Sobretiro de Retablo barroco a la Memoria de Francisco de la Maza, pp. 116–125.
- --------, Hospitales de la Nueva España. Fundaciones de los siglos XVII y XVIII, t.1 y 2, México, Jus, 1960.
