= National Polytechnic Institute College of Social and Administrative Sciences =

Division of the Instituto Politécnico Nacional

College of Social and Administrative Sciences
- Parent institution: National Polytechnic Institute

The College of Social and Administrative Sciences of the National Polytechnic Institute is an institute of higher education in Mexico. The College was proposed in 1932 by Secretary of Public Education Narciso Bassols. Currently the College is divided in three schools:

== Superior School of Business and Administration ==
- ESCA Unidad Santo Tomás "Escuela Superior de Comercio y Administración"
- ESCA Unidad Tepepan "Escuela Superior de Comercio y Administración"

== Superior School of Economics ==
- ESE "Escuela Superior de Economía"

== Superior School of Hospitality Management ==
- EST "Escuela Superior de Turismo"
