= Samuel Zaltzman =

Mexican pediatric nephrologist

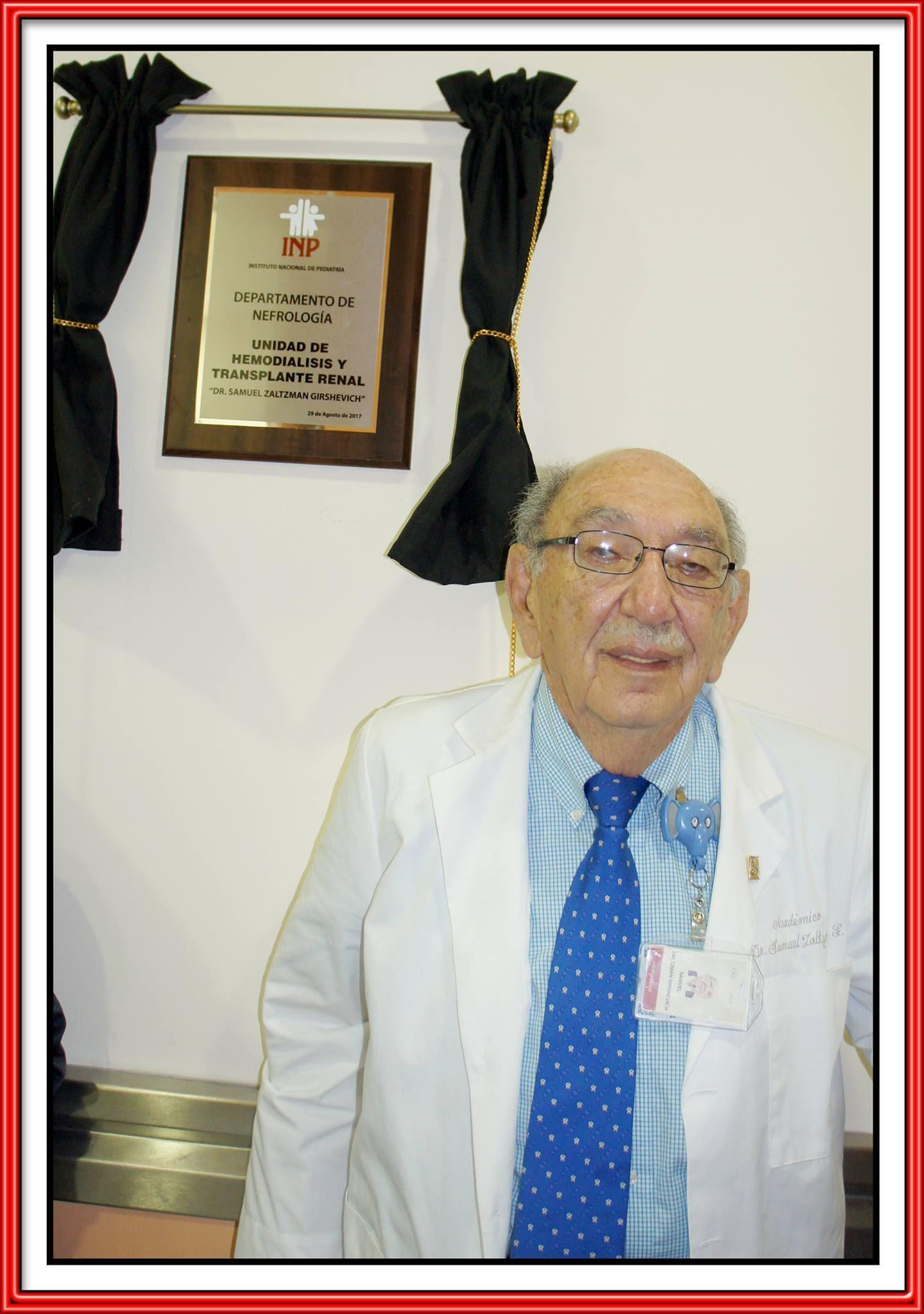
- Born: December 20, 1932; Mexico City, Mexico
- Died: May 12, 2022 (aged 89); Mexico City, Mexico
- Spouse: Linda Rifkin (m. 1964)

Samuel Zaltzman Girshevich (December 20, 1932 – May 12, 2022) was a Mexican paediatric nephrologist. One of the founders of the country's National Institute of Pediatrics, he performed one of the first successful kidney transplants in Mexico.

== Biography ==
Samuel Zaltzman Girshevich was born in 1932 in Mexico City. His parents, Eugenia Girshevich and Leon Zaltzman, were Jewish immigrants from Ukraine and Belarus.

In November 1964, he married Linda Rifkin. Zaltzman died in Mexico City on May 12, 2022, aged 89.

== Medical career ==
Zaltzman trained as an internist at the School of Medicine, UNAM. In 1955, he completed his internship in the Department of Pathology at the General Hospital of Mexico, and was recognized as a surgeon by National Autonomous University of Mexico in 1956.

He entered the postgraduate program at the Michael Reese Hospital and Medical Center in Chicago in 1956 as a fellow in pediatric research. He later specialized at the Presbyterian St. Luke's Hospital in Chicago. In 1961, he interned at the Hôpital Necker-Enfants malades in Paris and continued his studies in kidney transplantation at the University Hospital of Birmingham, England, until 1963.

In 1967, Zaltzman returned to Mexico and was the head of the dialysis and kidney transplant service at the National Institute of Cardiology of Mexico along with Herman Villarreal. Together, they performed the first kidney transplant, with an average survival rate of 8 years, in 1968. That same year, he joined the medical staff at ABC Hospital.

In 1970, Zaltzman founded the nephrology service at the Mexican Institution for Assistance to Children (currently the National Institute of Pediatrics). This was one of three in the country—the others being led by doctors Gustavo Gordillo Paniagua at the Federico Gómez Children's Hospital of Mexico and Santos-Atheron at the Mexican Social Security Institute (IMSS) Children's Hospital. Zaltzman would continue to head the program until his retirement in 2016.

In 1972, he was appointed president of the Mexican Institute of Nephrological Research. In 1978, he began teaching at the National Autonomous University of Mexico, serving as an instructor of nephrology for the next 44 years.

In 1986, Zaltzman was a founding member of the Mexican Council of Nephrology.

== Honors ==
- National Award for Medical Assistance from the Health Sector delivered by President José López Portillo (1980).
- Excellence in Medicine Award from the ABC Medical Center in recognition of his contributions and achievements during 40 years as a doctor at the ABC hospital (2009).
- The Hemodialysis and Kidney Transplant Unit of the National Institute of Pediatrics bears his name in recognition of his professional trajectory (2017).
- Recognition from the National Institute of Pediatrics for 50 years of service in favor of Mexican children in the service of the Federal Public Administration (2017).
