= Esther Orozco =

Mexican biologist, researcher and politician (born 1945)

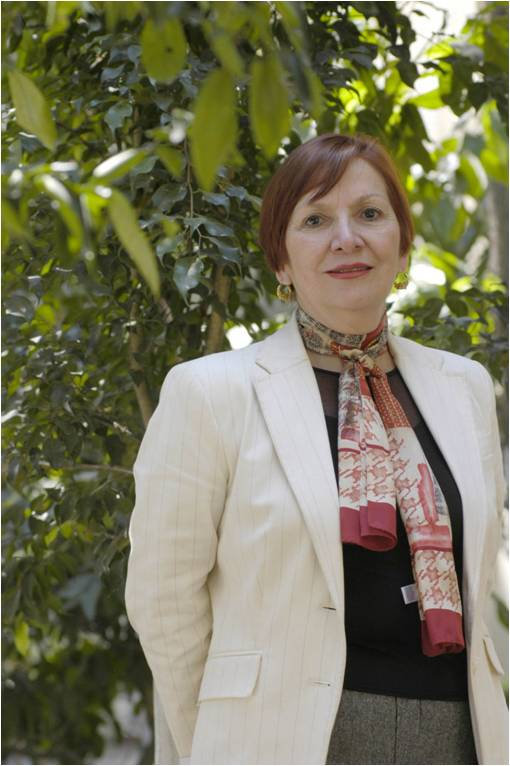
- Born: 25 April 1945 (age 81); Guerrero, Chihuahua, Mexico
- Education: Autonomous University of Chihuahua and National Polytechnic Institute
- Awards: UNESCO/Institut Pasteur Medal (1997) and L'Oréal-UNESCO Award for Women in Science (2006)
- Scientific career
- Fields: Amoebiasis
- Workplaces: Cinvestav

María Esther Orozco Orozco (born 18 April 1945 in San Isidro Pascual Orozco, Chihuahua, Mexico) is a Mexican chemist, bacteriologist, parasitologist and teacher. Her research has been the mechanisms by which Entamoeba histolytica causes disease. She is currently the Minister of International Cooperation in Science and Technology at the Mexican Embassy in France.

== Biography ==
=== Education ===
Esther Orozco is a teacher and scientist. She received a bachelor's degree in chemistry from the Autonomous University of Chihuahua, a master's degree and a PhD in cell biology both from the CINVESTAV-IPN.

=== Research areas ===
Her research in the Centro de Investigación y de Estudios Avanzados del IPN (México) is focused on the molecular biology and genetics of Entamoeba histolytica, mainly in the genes and proteins that drive the virulence mechanisms of this human parasite, willing to develop a vaccine and more efficient treatments against amoebiasis.

- Molecular biology of virulence factors of Entamoeba histolytica
- Molecular biology and molecular genetics of multidrug resistance in E. histolytica
- Organization of the amebic genome
- Molecules and genes involved in Entamoeba histolytica phagocytosis
- The role of the ESCRT machinery in amoeba phagocytosis and virulence

=== Academic background ===
In 1982 she joined the Department of Genetics and Molecular Biology at CINVESTAV-IPN. Since 1990 she works in the Department of Infectomics and Molecular Pathogenesis (formerly Experimental Pathology) of this research center based in Mexico City.

For a decade, she worked as a researcher at the Howard Hughes Medical Institute. She was a fellow in several foundations such as the John Simon Guggenheim and the Fogarty International Center. As a visiting scholar, she had lectured at Harvard University and the Weizmann Institute of Science, among other international institutions.

Co-founder of the Research Center of Applied Science and Technology (CICATA) of the IPN.

She also established the Postgraduate Program in Genomic Sciences at the Autonomous University of Mexico City (2003), and was a member of the Advisory Council of the same university.

== Awards and honors ==
She has been honored with the Pasteur Medal, awarded by the Pasteur Institute and the UNESCO, “for her discovery of the mechanism and control of infections by amoebae in the tropics”, and with the L’Oréal UNESCO for Woman in Science Award. She was international fellow of the Howard Hughes Medical Institute for 10 years.

She is a member of the Mexican Academy of Sciences (AMC) and the World Academy of Sciences (TWAS).

In 2011, Esther Orozco was designated as an Emeritus Researcher by the Center for Research and Advanced Studies of the National Polytechnic Institute (Spanish: Centro de Investigación y de Estudios Avanzados del Instituto Politécnico Nacional or CINVESTAV-IPN), where she works since 1981.

In 2012, she was named Emeritus National Researcher by the Conacyt’s National System of Researchers (SNI). Up to 2022, there are only 462 members of the SNI (102 of them women) with this distinction of emeritus within the roster of 36,714 Mexican researchers members of the SNI.

She has also been recognized by the Congress of Chihuahua, where she was born, and by the [Assembly ohttps://en.wikipedia.org/wiki/Legislative Assembly of Mexico Cityf Mexico City. Assembly of Mexico City.]

- Miguel Otero National Award from the Ministry of Health (1985)
- UNESCO and Institute Pasteur Louis Pasteur Medal (1997)
- 2004 Woman of the Year Award in the area of health given by Master Card Corporation and Glamour 2021 magazine (2004)
- L'Oréal-UNESCO for Women in Science Award (2006)
- Medal for Citizen Merit in Science from the Federal District Legislative Assembly (2006)
- Omeccíhuatl Medal granted by the Women's Institute of Mexico City (2009)
- The Chihuahua State Congress and the Chihuahua Women's Institute created the Prominent Chihuahua Women's Award, given annually to reward “women whose activities have raised the name of the state where they were born”. In the scientific field, the award is named after María Esther Orozco Orozco
- Emeritus Researcher by the CINVESTAV-IPN (2011)
- National Emeritus Researcher by the Conacyt's National System of Researchers (2012)
- Líderes Mexicanos magazine ranked her among the 300 most influential Mexican leaders (2020)

== Political and administrative positions ==
She served as Secretary of Planning at the CINVESTAV-IPN (1990 to 1994).

In the 1998 elections, she ran as the Party of the Democratic Revolution's external candidate for Governor. Her memoirs during the campaign are narrated in her book Si la mujer está: Chihuahua, abriendo caminos en la lucha por la democracia (If the Woman is Present: Chihuahua, Opening Paths in the Struggle for Democracy).

She was the founder and, from 2006 to 2010, General Director the Institute of Science and Technology of Mexico City (ICyTDF), during the administration of Marcelo Ebrard Casaubon (former Head of Government). The ICyTDF was conceived as a public body to “promote the use of science and technology for contribute to the solution of the problems of the Mexican capital and the welfare of the population; promote local science; act as an articulating link between the Mexico City government agencies and scientific and technological research groups, the social, educational and business sectors, as well as increase a scientific culture in society.

Dr. Orozco was a Rector of the Autonomous University of Mexico City (2010 to 2013).

From June 2019 to September 2021, Esther Orozco was a scientific advisor to the Ministry of Foreign Affairs of the Mexican Government. During this period, she coordinated the technical-scientific group representing Mexico in the Coalition for Epidemic Preparedness Innovations (CEPI), which was formed in collaboration with universities, research centers and national companies to face the COVID-19 pandemic. Through this consortium, funding was obtained from international cooperation resources to accelerate Mexican projects aimed to develop diagnostics methods and vaccines against the SARS-CoV-2 virus.

On September 7, 2021, she was appointed as Minister of Cooperation in Science and Technology at the Mexican Embassy in France, her current position.

=== Selected publications ===
- Debnath, A., Parsonage, D., Andrade, R. M., He, C., Cobo, E. R., Hirata, K., Chen, S., García-Rivera, G., Orozco, E., Martínez, M. B., Gunatilleke, S. S., Barrios, A. M., Arkin, M. R., Poole, L. B., McKerrow, J. H., & Reed, S. L. (2012). A high-throughput drug screen for Entamoeba histolytica identifies a new lead and target. Nature medicine, 18(6), 956–960. https://doi.org/10.1038/nm.2758
- Orozco, E., Guarneros, G., Martinez-Palomo, A., Sanchez, T. (1983). Entamoeba histolytica. Phagocytosis as a virulence factor. J Exp Med, 158(5), 1511–1521. https://doi.org/10.1084/jem.158.5.1511
- Garcia‐Rivera, G., Rodriguez, M. A., Ocadiz, R., Martinez‐Lopez, M. C., Arroyo, R., Gonzalez‐Robles, A., Orozco, E. (1999). Entamoeba histolytica: a novel cysteine protease and an adhesin form the 112kDa surface protein. Molecular Microbiology, 33(3), 556–568. https://doi.org/10.1046/j.1365-2958.1999.01500.x
- Keene, W. E., Hidalgo, M. E., Orozco, E., McKerrow, J. H. (1990). Entamoeba histolytica: Correlation of the cytopathic effect of virulent trophozoites with secretion of a cysteine proteinase. Experimental Parasitology, 71(2), 199–206. https://doi.org/10.1016/0014-4894(90)90022-5
- Arroyo, R., Orozco, E. (1987). Localization and identification of an Entamoeba histolytica adhesin. Molecular and Biochemical Parasitology, 23(2), 151–158. https://doi.org/10.1016/0166-6851(87)90150-2

You can consult Esther Orozco's scientific publications here.
