= Pedro Coronel =

Mexican sculptor and painter (1922–1985)

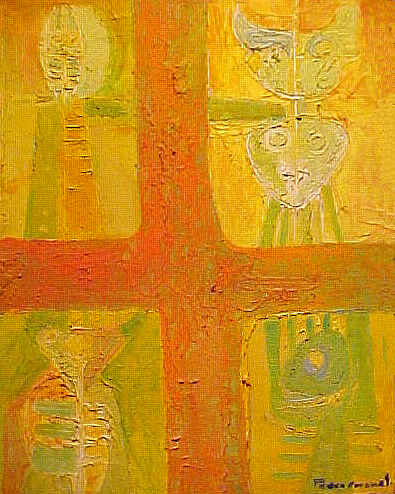
Painting by Coronel

Pedro Coronel (March 25, 1922 – May 23, 1985) was a Mexican sculptor and painter. He was part of the Generación de la Ruptura, which brought innovation into Mexican art in the mid 20th century. Coronel's training was with artists of the Mexican muralism tradition, with influence from artists like Diego Rivera. This influence remained with the use of pre Hispanic themes and colors in his work. However, his artistic trajectory took him towards more use of color and more abstract forms in his work, due to influences from artists such as Rufino Tamayo. His work was exhibited and gained recognition in Mexico, the United States and Europe. Shortly before his death, he donated his considerable personal art collection to the people of Mexico, which was used to open the Museo Pedro Coronel in the city of Zacatecas.

== Life ==
Pedro Coronel was born on March 25, 1921, in Jerez, Zacatecas to an upper-middle-class family. His mother played the violin and his father played the clarinet and violin. On Sundays they would get together and play folk music. The youngest of his brothers and sisters, Rafael, became a well-known painter of Moors, monks and the elderly.

Pedro was a restless child, a dreamer and very rebellious. He did not like school, often skipping classes taking twelve years to finish his primary education. Instead, he preferred to go to the quarry and watch the workers carve out pieces of stone from the mountain. As a boy, he collected tops, marbles and puppets. This hobby would later evolve into a large collection of art from various parts of the world.

His interest in art led him to study at the Escuela Nacional de Pintura, Escultura y Grabado "La Esmeralda" when he was only thirteen, when the school had teachers such as Diego Rivera, José Clemente Orozco, Frida Kahlo and Francisco Zúñiga. Coronel forged friendships with Rivera, Zuñiga and Santos Balmori. He began by studying sculpture, but Santos Balmori’s influence encouraged him to paint. This led him to appreciate the uses of color.

As he began his art career, he visited Paris in 1946, deciding to make it his second home in the late 1940s through 1950s, dividing years half in Paris and half in Mexico City. In the 1960s, he was a teacher at La Esmeralda, residing mostly in Mexico but traveling frequently to Europe, Asian and the United States. During this time, he also worked with Mathias Goeritz, Rufino Tamayo and Pedro Friedeberg on the Hotel Camino Real in Mexico City.

Coronel has been characterized as having a strong and sometimes violent personality as well as making curt responses. However, he has also been characterized as honest and fair. He said “he who does not yell, he who does not tremble, had no right to live.” referring “life” in the sense of feeling. He said he feared death only because it would end his painting. He was briefly married to Amparo Dávila, a Mexican writer but his long-term eighteen-year relation was with his second wife, Réjane Lalonde.

Over his life, he amassed a large collection of pre Hispanic, African, Asian, Greco-Romano and Medieval art along with graphic art, with over 1,800 pieces from various places and times including Roman, Egyptian and Chinese works as well as art and handcrafts from Africa, the Mexican colonial period and works by Goya, Picasso, Miró and Chagall. This collection was exhibited shortly before Coronel’s death and public reaction to it prompted him to donate it to the Mexican people and since 1986 it has been part of the permanent collection of a museum named after him in Zacatecas.

Coronel died on May 23, 1985, in Mexico City. In 1986 his remains were moved to Zacatecas in accordance to his will, now at the Museo Pedro Coronel.

== Career ==
While Coronel began his career as a sculptor, he divided his career between that and painting, with the painting becoming more important. Most of his artistic production occurred between 1949 and 1984, most of which consists of oils on canvas and masonite as well as sculptures in onyx and sandstone. In his early career he worked in Paris with Victor Brauner and sculptor Constantin Brâncuși. He had his first exhibition of paintings in 1954, which attracted the interest of art critics. From then to the end of his career he exhibited his work in Mexico, France, Italy, the United States and Brazil.

His important works include Toro mugiendo a la luna (1958), La lucha (1959), Los deshabitados, los hombres huecos, El sol es una flor (1967-1968), Año I Luna (1969), Alfar de sueños, Habitantes de amaneceres, Bodas solares, Camino de soles and Poética lunar.

Recognitions for his work include the National Painting Prize in 1959, the José Clemente Orozco Prize (first place for painting and honorable mention in sculpture), the II Inter-American Biennial in Mexico in 1960, the Salón de la Pintura prize of the Salón de la Plástica Mexicana in 1966 and the Premio Nacional de Arte in 1984. He was a founding member of the Salón de la Plástica Mexicana. In 1971 Justino Fernández published a book about him called Pedro Coronel, pintor y escultor. The state of Zacatecas named him a favorite son (Hijo predilecto) in 1977.

Since his death, his work continues to be exhibited in various venues in Mexico. In 2005, the Museo de Arte Moderno had a retrospective of his work thirty years after his death, mostly of large scale oils. In 2009, there was an exhibition of his graphic work at the state government building of Tabasco in Villahermosa.

== Artistry ==
Pedro Coronel is classed as part of the Generación de la Ruptura. In the opinion of Santos Balmori, Coronel and Rufino Tamayo reinvented Mexican painting from its roots, finding a new way to connect the past with the present. Themes that appear in his work include mankind’s fears as well as anguish, pain and death. However, there are works which express love, sensuality, eroticism and life such as "Venus mexica" (1949), "la niña de la morena" (1940) and "La dama de las frutas" (1949). He began his career as a sculptor which influenced his painting by adding volume and solidity to his images.

Although his aim in his work was spontaneity and freedom of expression, in reality it follows a trajectory leaning towards abstraction. His work has been divided into stages such as naturalist, structuralist, lyrical, chromatic, and the revival of native indigenous themes. His early work is mostly figurative. This work creates juxtapositions fields, idealistic images and a convergence of reality and fantasy. His later work is when his style is more personal and set, figures giving way to forms and color. From 1953 to 1957 his work is influenced by Expressionism with some influence from Picasso with topics from everyday life such as bottles, glasses or lamps. Notable works from this period include Retrato de Mujer in 1953 and Naturaleza Muerta in 1956. A later stage shows interest in allegories with mythical personages. These paintings include El Advenimiento de Ella and La Lucha both from 1958 and Mujeres Habitadas from 1960. After this, his paintings became more colorful with lines simplifying such as in Los Fantoches Luminarios in 1962 and Rincón de Sueño from 1961. From 1962 to 1963 influence from Rufino Tamayo can be seen in paintings such as Interno Mágico from 1963. From 1966 to 1975 he worked became more abstract. These years also encompass the majority of his production. This later work is characterized by taking the use of color to its limits but not overdoing it. This use of color follows that of his predecessor, Rufino Tamayo, but Coronel’s innovation is the use of intense, more pure colors, and the harmonization of background with form, unlike other painters, including his brother Rafael, where the background is subservient to the main topic. Two colors which dominate many of his works are red and yellow, which tend to reflect melancholy, passion and loneliness.

While a member of the Generación of the Ruptura, much of his work has pre Hispanic themes and colors, which were marks of the Mexican muralists. Works along these lines include "La niña de la morena", "La serie de los apóstoles" and "El regreso de Quetzalcoatl" (The return of Quetzalcoatl), a later work which is semi abstract. His work has been described as having an element of violence similar to that of ancient Mesoamerican art.

== Museo Pedro Coronel ==
Coronel’s donation of his personal art collection before his death prompted the creation of the Museo Pedro Coronel, inaugurated in 1985 by President Miguel de la Madrid in the city of Zacatecas. It is located in the former Real Colegio y Seminario de San Luis Gonzada, which was a Jesuit school founded in 1616. It later was run by the Dominicans in 1785 as the Colegio de la Purísima Concepción. From the 19th century to 1962, it served as a jail. In 1983 it was reconditioned for its current use as a museum. The Museo Pedro Coronel sponsors an art competition in his name called the Pedro Coronel Biennal, sponsored by the state of Zacatecas along with CONACULTA and Instituto Nacional de Bellas Artes . However, despite the existence of the museum it is not easy to see the works of the painter in public. In 2010 the Miguel Alemán Foundation signed an agreement with the institution to preserve and promote the painter’s work.

== See also ==
- Rafael Coronel, his younger brother, also a renowned painter.
