= National Polytechnic Institute College of Engineering and Physical-Mathematic Sciences =

Institution of higher education in Mexico

College of Engineering
- Parent institution: National Polytechnic Institute

The College of Engineering and Physical-Mathematic Sciences of the National Polytechnic Institute is an institute of higher education in Mexico. The College was proposed in 1932 by Secretary of Public Education Narciso Bassols and was founded by integrating the already existent School of Mechanical and Electrical Sciences that dates back to the 19th century. The college is divided into six schools.

== Schools ==
- Escuela Superior de Cómputo (ESCOM; Higher School of Computing)
- Escuela Superior de Física y Matemáticas (ESFM; Higher School of Physics and Mathematics)
- Escuela Superior de Ingeniería y Arquitectura (ESIA; Higher School of Engineering and Architecture)
  - Units: Tecamachalco, Ticomán, Zacatenco
- Escuela Superior de Ingeniería Mecánica y Eléctrica (ESIME; Higher School of Mechanical and Electrical Engineering)
  - Units: Azcapotzalco, Culhuacán, Ticomán, Zacatenco
- Escuela Superior de Ingeniería Química e Industrias Extractivas (ESIQIE; Higher School of Chemical Engineering and Extractive Industries)
- Escuela Superior de Ingeniería Textil (ESIT; Higher School of Textile Engineering)
