= Rafael Coronel =

Mexican painter (1932–2019)

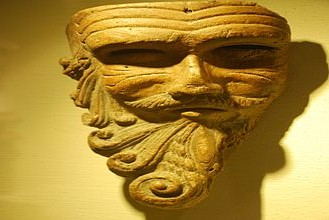
Mask in the Rafael Coronel Museum, Zacatecas

Rafael Coronel (24 October 1931 – 7 May 2019) was a Mexican painter. He was the son-in-law of Diego Rivera.

His representational paintings have a melancholic sobriety, and include faces from the past great masters, often floating in a diffuse haze. In what was the convent of San Francisco de Almoloyan y de Asís (a building from the 16th century), located in Zacatecas, there is a museum named after him; in this museum, his vast mask collection is shown.

== Biography ==
=== First years ===
The younger brother of Pedro Coronel, Rafael felt artistic inclinations since his earliest years. He studied in Escuela Nacional de Pintura, Escultura y Grabado "La Esmeralda", and he quickly developed a unique artistic vocabulary. His paintings are about popular themes.

The vocation of being a painter was something Rafael inherited. His grandfather used to decorate churches. When his father told him that Pedro, his brother, was studying to become a painter in Mexico City, he thought it was a great waste of time. Even the greatest painters in Mexico had to rely on other jobs.

=== Youth ===
Although he always liked to draw, Coronel thought that "Art gives no money to eat, and painting is a complement for other jobs". He didn't know that there were some professional painters.

When Coronel went to Mexico City he wanted to be a soccer player, a player for the América, but he promised he would study to become an accountant. When he arrived in the capital, he started to like architecture. In 1952 he won a painting contest. The piece that gave him the victory was the Mujer De Jerez, a piece of art done with crayons, since he had no money to buy better things. He won a scholarship of 300 pesos a month. After winning the contest he stated: "I betrayed my father, but I've done good for the country".

For the scholarship to be effective, he had to study in some painting school, so he decided to enter "La Esmeralda", two months later he was expelled for disobeying the teachers. The intentions of Coronel during that time were to show the Latin American people without garnishing them like Diego Rivera, David Alfaro Siqueiros, or José Clemente Orozco.

Coronel became a lonely man in 1969 when his wife, Ruth, the daughter of Diego Rivera and Lupe Marín, and mother of his only son, Juan Coronel, died. He had some girlfriends, and traveled around the world with them. Traveling helped him to "clear his vision about Mexico and makes my painting instincts, and puts me in front of the canvas with my brush, painting and painting".

=== Later years ===
Rafael worked 20 years in his uncle's workshop. He said that he has made his best work there. He lived in the city of Cuernavaca since the year 1981. In that studio, he said he made the largest plastic production he has achieved.

On the occasion of his 80th birthday in September 2011 Fine Arts opened in "retro-futuristic", an exhibition of 109 works that Coronel created 18 that year. These works break with earlier work by Coronel, because "in the same figuration, there are some decrepit characters. He puts the focus on the end of life, of women and men in old age. This is different, because we are used to seeing old age redeemed; in these tables, old age is presented as decline, an aspect never explored", said Juan Coronel Rivera, the son of the artist.

All stages in the creative life are represented in Coronel's retrofuturism, not just the time when performing works closely related to Spanish painting, as most of the audience remembers. In the collection there are also sculptures, drawings and works that have never been exhibited. Retrofuturism also has been presented at the Museo Rafael Coronel in Zacatecas and Monterrey MARCO.

Coronel died in Zacatecas, Zac., on 7 May 2019.

== Rafael Coronel Museum ==
The convent of San Francisco was the first to be founded in the province of Zacatecas in the year 1567, built as a temple. On December 7, 1648, the Temple was burned, and on March 5, 1949, reconstruction commenced.

Its rooms present a collection of more than 16,000 pieces, including masks, drawings, pots, terracotta, Prehispanic objects, puppets, votive offerings, pictures, crafts, musical instruments and colonial furniture. His collection of masks is considered the largest in the world. It also has a collection of works by Diego Rivera, among which is the study of child self-portrait of Diego's mural Dream of a Sunday Afternoon in Alameda Park. This work is on permanent display at the Museo Mural Diego Rivera in Mexico City.

The museum shows an exhibition that includes topics such as masks, the devil, Lent, Easter, Easter, the old dance, deer dance, animals, etc.. These masks are works of the artist. However most of the exhibits displayed in the museum are the artist's collections, such as the pot room, where many pre-Hispanic figures are shown in a wide exposure. The shoot-Rosette room displays a collection of puppets from the 19th and 20h centuries.

== Curriculum ==
1967 (January 9) – He shows in The Gallery of Modern Art, Phoenix, Arizona, USA .He exhibits “Mi abuela”. He also collaborates in the “kalikosmia” exhibition, where he presented abstract sculptures made in plastic. This was shown in the Museum of Modern Art of Mexico.

1968 (February 12-March 2) – He exhibits in the Gallery of Mexican Art “Rafael Coronel 20 óleos y 100 dibujos del viaje número 13". The exhibition was sponsored by the committee that organized the Olympic games in Mexico. He exhibited the familiar portrait and the brothers and inside the drawings Naked of a girl and Man Back in June on “Rafael Coronel Oleos”. Exhibition in the Gallery of Mexican Art September 9–30. He exhibits "Oleos de Rafael Coronel" in the Gallery of Mexican Art. October. He participated on October 4 in La Bendicion. The Mexican-Israeli cultural institute gave him a degree of constancy about the 10 trees that were planted in his name.

1969 (September 8) – He received from the governor of Zacatecas, Ruiz González, él "Racimo de Oro" gave by the Vitivinícola of Vergel, S.A Company because of his merit as a Zacatecan artist on October 27.

1970 (November 13- December 8) – He exhibits in The Museum of the University of Puerto Rico, “Botero, Coronel, Rodon”.

1972 (April 24-May 19) – He exhibited in the Gallery of Mexican Art "Rafael Coronel 45 nuevas pinturas". September 10–26 he exhibited in the ex temple of San Agustin in Zacatecas in the collective exhibition “5 Zacatecas painters” (Pedro Coronel, Manuel Felguerez, Rafael Coronel, Francisco de Santiago, José de Santiago).

1973 (May 9- July 15) – He exhibited La rata en el queso 2, Madrugada en la Merced 1, Santa Martha Acatitla: Lourdes; la rata verde, la rata en la mostaza y Tacubaya: la muerte de la libélula.

1974 (February 15) – Participated in an exposition at The B. Lewin Galleries, Beverly Hills, California, USA known as "Rafael Coronel major exhibition".

(March 15) – He received the invitation to participate in the I Bienal Internacional de Pintura Figurativa "The new image of the paint” in Japan (Tokyo and Osaka). Televisa hire him to paint 100 paintings. He delivered 117 but these were destroyed as a consequence of the earthquake in 1985.

1975 (May) – He donated to the Museum of Modern Art of Mexico City Tacubaya: la muerte de Libélula. He exhibited in The B. Lewin Galleries, Beverly Hills, California, USA. He was invited in the "An Evening the Stars", where he received a diploma.

1976 – Ines Amor, Director of the Gallery of Mexican Art, was sick so it was difficult to go to the gallery and it caused the separation between Rafael and the Gallery. He became exclusive painter in Mexico of the Gallery Misrachi, S.A.

1977 (February 19, June–July) – “collective exhibition” Recent Latín American Drawings (1969–1976) Lines of vision", sponsored by the International Exhibition Foundation, New York. He participated on the Five Figures Piece.

1979 (May 23) Was the tribute to Pedro Coronel and Rafael Coronel in Zacatecas, Zacatecas; organized by the government and the University Festejos de la IX Feria Nacional. Francisco Garcia Salinas declared Mr. Rafael Coronel Arroyo as a distinguished student.

1987 (April 20) – He participates in the collective exhibition “Mexico Contemporany Art” in the ITESM campus Mexico City.

1988 (October 22-December 4) – Individual exhibit "II mondo mágico di coronel" en Chiesa di San stae, organized by the Assessorato alla cultura Del comune di Venecia. Collective Exhibition “"primer Festival Deportivo y Cultural Rodrigo Gómez" in the Bank of Mexico

1990 (January–July) – He traslades to Zacatecas with Jose Antonio Cruz to collaborate with Alfonso Soto Soria and his team in the Montaje del Museo Rafael Coronel. July 5. Carlos Salinas de Gortari and the governor Genaro Borrego Estrada, inaugurated in the San Francisco Convent the “Museo Rafael Coronel”. It has 5000 400 pieces prehispanic Mexican masks, 1500 colonial pottery, 200 puppets Rosete Aranda Company and 100 drawings by Diego Rivera. On August he came back to Cuernavaca.

1991 (May 9) – Retrospective exhibition at the Mezzanine of the Tower of Petróleos Mexicanos in connection with the book launch Rafael Coronel, edited by PEMEX. Retrospective Exhibition "Painter Rafael Coronel" in the Gallery of the Cultural Complex Tonalli Yoliztli Soot.

1992 – Retrospective and part of his collection entitled "Treasures Mestizos Rafael Coronel." Presented at the Tecnologico de Monterrey, Campus Estado de Mexico.

1993 – The retrospective exhibition at B. Lewin Galleries, Palm Springs, California, In The Palm Springs Desert Museum presents "The Edith and B. Lewin Collection". Where Colonel participates with a score of works, including Time and Seller of antiques.

1994 (February 14-April 29) – Was a Retrospective exhibition "17 works of Rafael Coronel" in the International Airport "Benito Juarez" in Mexico City. June 7. He was Member of the Academy of Arts. Retrospective exhibition presented at the Presidency of the Republic.

1996 (December 13) – He was awarded the "Award Zacatecas 240" by the State Government. The National Council for Culture and the Arts, through the National Coordination of Decentralization, organized the retrospective entitled "Works on Paper Rafael Coronel", composed of 67 pieces, including Dog, Death and Self in New York, i which itineraries all states of the Republic for three years, among other places: August. Was a retrospective exhibition "Rafael Coronel." The Zacatecanos years.

1997 (April) – Group exhibition "Collection Bernard and Edith Lewin Art Museum of Los Angeles County." Palacio de Bellas Artes, Mexico City. Coronel introduced Mi abuela, among other works.

=== His work ===
He had exposed in different places:

- Bienal de São Paulo, Brazil.
- Castello Sforsesco en Milan, Italy.
- Museo real de Arte de Brussels, Belgium.
- The Contemporaries, in New York, USA.
- The Museum of Modern Art in New York, USA.
- Palacio Nacional de Bellas Artes in Mexico City.
- Museo de Arte Moderno, Mexico City.

=== Awards ===
The most notable awards given are:

- 1965, Brazil: Received the Cordoba Award for Best Young Latin American Artist at São Paulo's Biennial celebration.
- 1952, Mexico: Received the Visual Arts Award from the National Institute of Mexican Youth.
- 1974, Japan: Award received at the First International Biennial of Figurative Painting in Tokyo and Osaka.
- 1978, Mexico: Alongside his brother, Pedro Coronel, declared a Favourite Son by the State Government of Zacatecas in conjunction with the Autonomous University of Zacatecas.

=== First years ===
1937 – First drawings.

1944 – First self-portrait.

1951 – Entered into the National Youth Competition in the Mexican branch of visual arts.

1952 (19–21 July) – Received an Award of Plastic Arts Competition held by the Instituto Nacional de la juventud Mexicana (National Institute of Mexican Youth), directed by Mariano Ramírez Vázquez. The award was a diploma and a scholarship during a year of three hundred pesos each month. Twenty awards were given, one of the incentives granted to Robert Doniz. The paintpresented by Colonel Rafael was ““Mujer de Jerez””, undated; wax on cardboard, 55 X 54 inches. It was exposed in the gallery José Clemente Orozco (Peralvillo Avenue 55), a dependence from the INBA, the jury was composed by Carlos Orozco Romero, Ricardo Martinez and Jorge Juan Crespo de la Serna. As a requirement for him to be awarded the scholarship, he had to enroll into the School of painting and sculpture Esmeralda, where Carlos Orozco Romero was his teacher.

1953 – Participated in two exhibitions, one in the Gallery in the Cervantes library, at the Esmeralda Gallery and another in the Excelsior Gallery. Due to disagreements, a year later he left the drawing classes, but he continued attending to the Esmeralda Gallery. Here he met his friend Francis Corzas.

1954 – On a recommendation from the Guatemalan painter Carlos Mérida, Rafael Coronel met Ines Amor and entered into the Mexican Art Gallery, Leaved La Esmeralda. This was the last year he lived with his sister Hope Santa Julia.

1955 (April) – Elvira, the director of the gallery opened Gandara New Generations, INBA decency. Rafael Coronel participated in the inaugural exhibition with a paint titled Clown and outdoors.

1956 (May) – First solo exhibition at the Galería de Arte Mexicano.

1957 – By this time, Inés Amor takes him as her unique artist. He painted ““La perra negra”” and ““Cabeza de muchacho””.

Mounted, 29 October 1958 his second solo exhibition in the hall of Mexican Plastic, headed by Gabriela Orozco. Mixed media on cardboard displays 80. The painting ““La rata en el queso””was acquired by Luis Corzo and Aragon.

In June–July 1959, He participated in the exhibition Arte de Hoy, at the Galeria de Arte Mexicano. Also participated at the Second Biennial of Art in Mexico with the ““Rata en el basurero””.

June 1959 – He presented his first solo exhibition in the Palacio de Bellas Artes; called "portraits". The exhibition was mounted in the Sala verde(today Diego Rivera's room), at that the Museum of Modern Art. He started dating with Ruth Rivera Marin. Exhibited at The Forsythe Gallery, Ann Arbor, Michigan, United States.

1960 (28 June–26 Jul) – He participated in the exhibition "Artists of the new wave" in the Gallery CDI. With the work ““Sabado Nocturno””. During September he was a member of the collective exhibition "Retrospective Exhibition" of Mexican Painting "at the Museum of the Ciudad Universitaria. This exhibition was presented because of the Third General Conference by International Association of Universities. He exhibited ““Carnaval”” and ““Azul de la mancha””.

(13–22 October) – Individual exhibition at the Gallery of Mexican Art called "Doscientos estudios para una pequeña zoología””.

(24 November) – He participated in the exhibition-sale of the Sal+on de la Plastica Mexicana, with the work ““Cabeza de Caballo””.

== See also ==
- Rafael Coronel Site and Curriculum
- Pedro Coronel, his elder brother, also an accomplished painter and sculptor
- José Luis Cuevas
- Lucie-Smith, Edward (1993). "7". Latin American Art. Thames and Hudson. pp. 118–119.

http://www.babab.com/no02/rafael_coronel.htm
