= Mireille Dosso =

Comorian-born Ivorian microbiologist and virologist

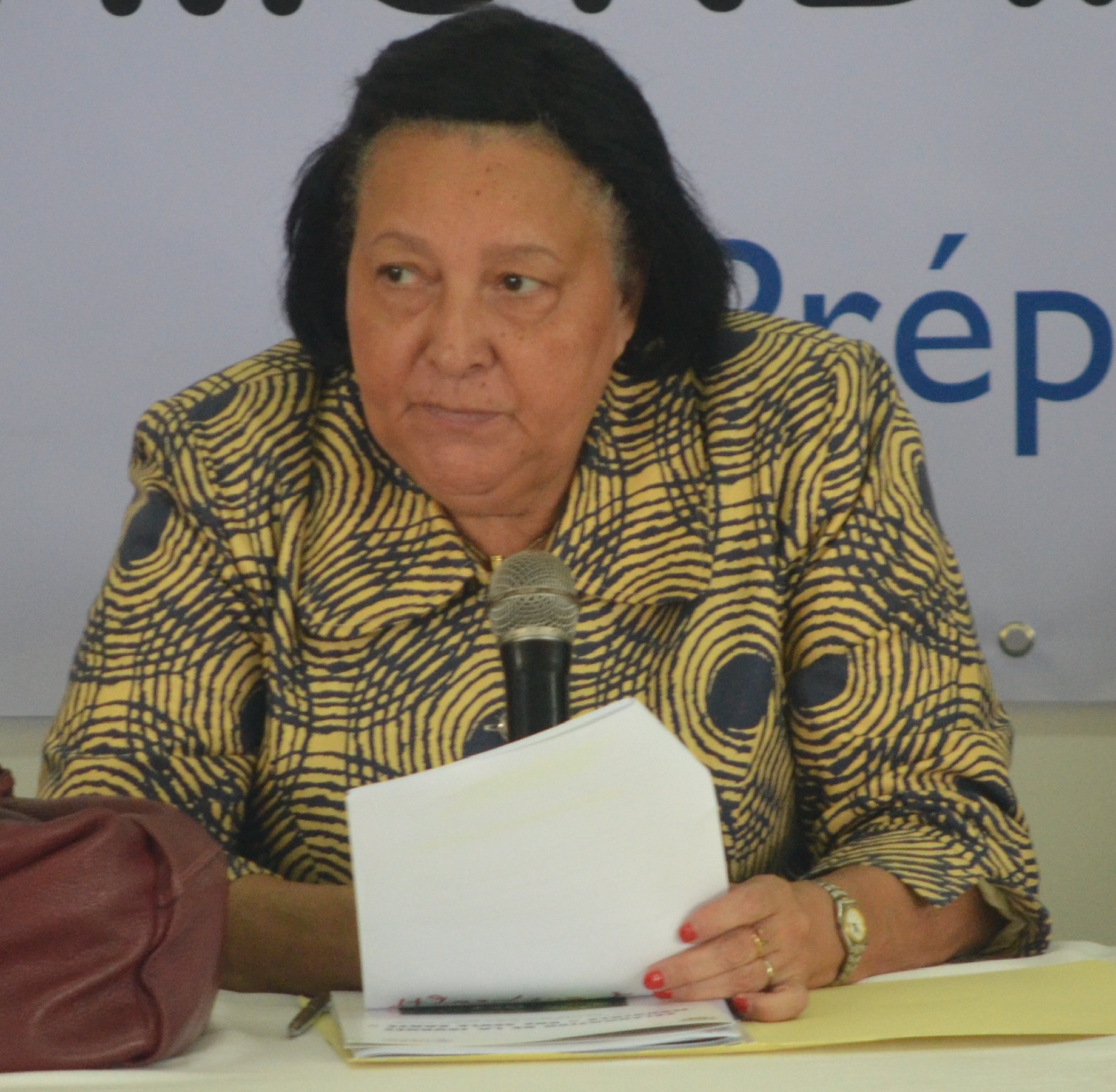
- Born: April 27, 1952 (age 74) island of Anjouan
- Citizenship: Comoros, Algeria
- Education: Université Félix Houphouët-Boigny, University of Montpellier
- Occupations: microbiologist, virologist, director
- Employer: Pasteur Institute
- Spouse: Adama Dosso
- Awards: UNESCO/Institut Pasteur Medal, Economic Community of West African States (ECOWAS) Prize for Scientific Women

Mireille Carmen Dosso (born April 27, 1952) is a Comorian-born Ivorian microbiologist and virologist. Appointed director of the Pasteur Institute in Abidjan in 2004, she has recently become one of the leading Africans to be involved in the fight against COVID-19. She has previously been successful in fighting other viruses, including the H1N1 swine fever pandemic and dengue fever in 2019.

== Biography ==
Born on 27 April 1952 on the island of Anjouan, Mireille Dosso passed the baccalaureat in 1969. She then attended the medical department at the Université Félix Houphouët-Boigny in Abidjan, earning a doctorate in 1980, the first woman to do so. In 1974, she married Adama Dosso, a military pilot, who was assassinated in 2011.

Thanks to a scholarship, she continued her studies in Marseille (1981), Montpellier. She went on to earn a second doctorate in human biology at the University of Montpellier in 1988 before returning to Abidjan. After serving as a university lecturer in microbiology, in 1992 she was promoted to professor. In 1997, she became a member of CAMES (Conseil africain et malgache pour l'enseignement supérieur).

Appointed director of the Pascal Institute in the Ivory Coast in 1972, she now forms part of the scientific committee responsible for monitoring progress on COVID-19, the only woman member.

== Awards ==
In November 2005 in Budapest, Mireille Dosso was honoured with the UNESCO/Institut Pasteur Medal. In 2011, she was awarded the Economic Community of West African States (ECOWAS) Prize for Scientific Women.
