= Eduardo Liceaga =

Mexican physician (1839–1920)

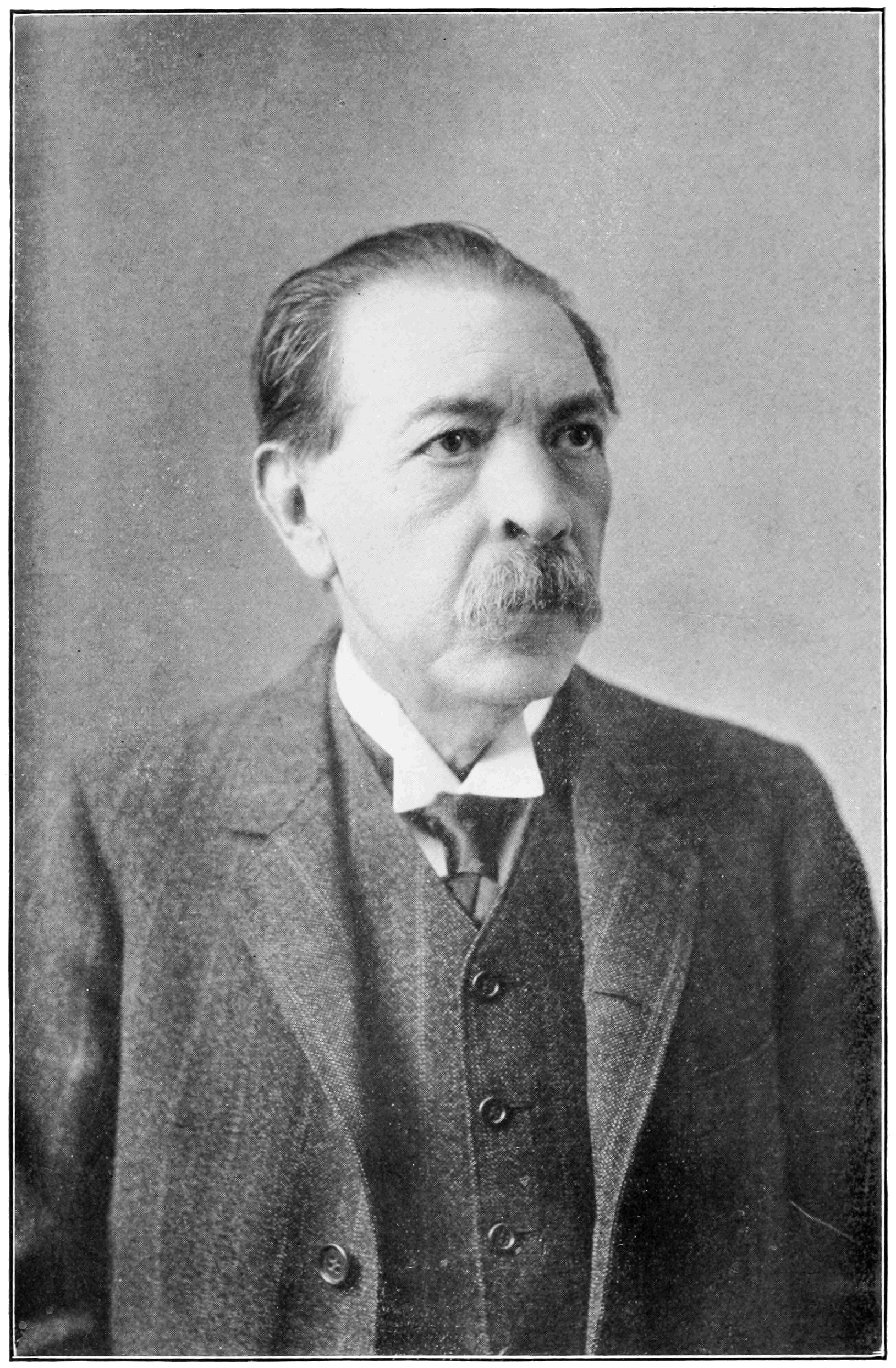
- Born: October 13, 1839; Guanajuato City
- Died: January 14, 1920 (aged 80)
- Medical career
- Profession: Physician
- Field: Pediatrics, Public health

Eduardo Liceaga (1839–1920) was a Mexican physician known as the "most distinguished hygienist of late-nineteenth century Mexico". He was involved in the establishment of the General Hospital of Mexico.

== Early life and education ==
Liceaga was born on October 13, 1839, in Guanajuato City, Guanajuato, the son of Dr. Francisco Liceaga and Trinidad Torres de Liceaga. He was educated at the old College of San Gregorio, Mexico City where he took the first prize in Latin, and later at the College of the State of Guanajuato, winning there prizes and honorable mention. His medical education was received at the National School of Medicine in Mexico City, from which he graduated in 1866.

== Career ==
He commenced practice in Mexico City. For many years he taught surgery in his alma mater, and became its director, serving from 1904 until 1910. In 1913 he was made honorary director. For twenty-five years he was director of the Maternity and Infant Hospital.

He represented Mexico at many international congresses, including the Public Health Congress at Vienna, Austria; the Medical Congress at Moscow; the Tuberculosis Congress, and the Congress on Hygiene and Demography, both at Washington; the first and third Pan-American Congresses, at Washington and Havana, respectively, and international conventions at Washington, Mexico and Costa Rica. From 1893 to 1913 he represented his country at the meetings of the American Public Health Association, serving as president of the association in 1896.

He wrote numerous scientific papers on hygiene and public health, medicine and surgery. The National Academy of Medicine of Mexico made a special award to him for his work on "Dislocation of the Clavicle." He was for many years president of the Board of Health of Mexico, during which time many active campaigns against disease were carried out and new measures inaugurated. He took an active part in writing the Sanitary Code of the City of Mexico, and was a member of the commission in charge of building the General Hospital of that city. During his administration rabies vaccination was established, yellow fever along the Gulf Coast, and bubonic plague at Mazatlan were brought under control.

He was a member of the following Mexican scientific societies: Lancasterian Company; Mexican Geographical and Statistical Society; the Medical Society of San Luis Potosi; the National Academy of Medicine; the Medical and Pharmaceutical Society of Puebla; the Medical-Surgical Association "Larrey"; Medical Society of Guanajuato; Medical Society of Jalisco; Medical and Pharmaceutical Society of Merida; and the Mexican Society of Surgery.

Many honors were bestowed upon him: Knight of the Order of Guadalupe in 1866; diploma as honorary member of the Mexican Geographical and Statistical Society; honorary member of the Physicians and Pharmacists of Merida; foreign member of the Academy of Medicine of Venezuela; honorary member of the Surgical and Medical Society of San Sebastian, Spain; degree of vice-president of the Mexican Society "Antonio Alzate." The Emperor Maximilian I bestowed on him the degree of Surgeon and a gold medal.

== Personal life and death ==
He was married December 24, 1870, to Dolores Fernandes de Zanregni, and had four children. Liceaga died January 14, 1920.
