= UNESCO/Institut Pasteur Medal =

- Awarded for: "outstanding research contributing to a beneficial impact on human health and to the advancement of scientific knowledge in related fields such as medicine, fermentations, agriculture and food."
- Presented by: United Nations Educational, Scientific and Cultural Organization (UNESCO) and the Pasteur Institute
- First award: 1995

The UNESCO/Institut Pasteur Medal is a biennial international science prize created jointly by UNESCO and the Pasteur Institute in 1995 "to be awarded in recognition of outstanding research contributing to a beneficial impact on human health and to the advancement of scientific knowledge in related fields such as medicine, fermentations, agriculture and food." Its creation marked the centenary of the death of Louis Pasteur. The future of the prize is under review.

== Laureates ==
Year	Recipient	Country
1995	Natth Bhamarapravati	Thailand
1997	Esther Orozco	Mexico
1999	Luiz Pereira da Silva	Brazil
2001	Sima Rafati Seyedi Yazdi	Iran
2003	Fadila Boulahbal	Algeria
2005	Mireille Dosso	Ivory Coast

== See also ==
- List of biomedical science awards
