= General Hospital of Mexico =

Coordinates: 19.41304°N 99.151936°W

- Secretariat of Health, Mexico
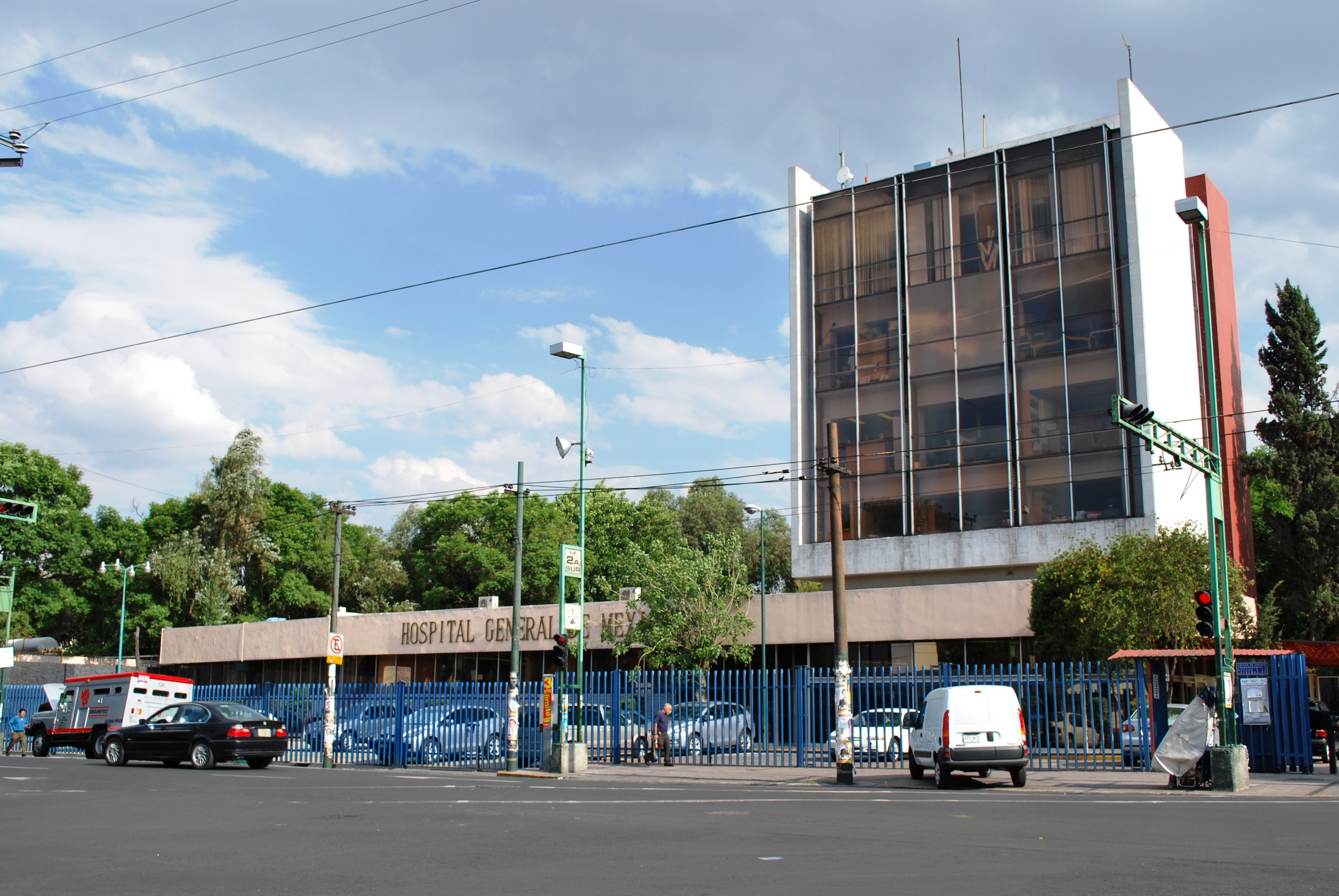

Geography
- Location: Mexico City, Mexico

Organisation
- Type: Teaching
- Network: Federal Reference Hospitals

History
- Founded: February 5, 1905

Links
- Lists: Hospitals in Mexico

The General Hospital of Mexico (Hospital General de México, HGM) is a hospital in Mexico City, operated by the Secretariat of Health, the federal government department in charge of all social health services in Mexico.

== History ==
Towards the end of the 19th century, Dr. Eduardo Liceaga proposed the construction of a new hospital to fulfill the sanitary needs of the city. The General Hospital began its construction in 1896, with a total budget for the project of four million eight thousand pesos, and was inaugurated on February 5, 1905, by president Gral. Porfirio Díaz.

At the time of its opening, there were 600 beds in 18 pavilions and four basic specialities. Around the 1920s and 1930s there was a big medical and scientific development at the hospital, where several branches of medicine developed new resources and procedures for patient care. Dr. Aquilino Villanueva in the Urology Unit, Dr. Ignacio Chavez in the Cardiology Unit, Dr. Abraham Ayala Gonzalez in the Gastroenterology Unit, among others, strengthened the Institution and contributed with the formation of new physicians.

The General Hospital was the seedbed of some of the most important Mexican health institutions, like the National Institutes of Cardiology, Nutrition, Oncology and Respiratory Infections.

== 1985 Mexico City earthquake ==
The 1985 Mexico City earthquake damaged the Gynaecology Unit, and the Medical Residence tower was completely destroyed. More than 295 people died, including patients, residents, and medical staff.

== Breakthroughs ==
Researchers from the hospital found that classical music composed by Mozart had a positive effect on heart disease. The hospital is a leader in developing pharmaceutical guidelines for the country.

The Hospital General Metro station serves the hospital.
