= List of hospitals in Mexico =

There are 4,466 hospitals in Mexico. 67% of hospitals are private and the remaining 33% are public. The most important public hospital institutions are the Secretariat of Health (Secretaria de Salud), Mexican Social Security Institute (IMSS) and Institute for Social Security and Services for State Workers (ISSSTE). These form an integral part of the Mexican healthcare system.

This is a list of hospitals in Mexico.

== Mexico City ==
- American British Cowdray Medical Center - Mexico City, DF
- American British Cowdray Medical Center SANTA FE CAMPUS, Mexico City DF MEXICO
- Centro Médico Nacional Siglo XXI - Av. Cuauhtémoc No. 330, entre Dr. Márquez y Dr. Morones, Col. Doctores, Del. Cuauhtémoc
- Fundacion Hospital Nuestra Señora de la Luz - E. Montes 135, col. San Rafael, CP 06030.
- Médica Sur - Mexico City DF MEXh
- Médica Sur Lomas - Acueducto Rio Hondo No. 20 Col. Lomas Virreyes - Mexico City DF MEXICO
- Instituto Nacional de Cancerología INCAN - México DF City MEX
- Instituto Nacional de Ciencias Medicas y Nutricion Salvador Zubiran INNSZ - Tlalpan, México City DF MEX
- Instituto Nacional de Neurología y Neurocirugía Manuel Velasco Suárez (INNN) - Insurgentes Sur, Mexico City
- Instituto Nacional de Perinatología INPer - Mexico City, DF
- Cirugía del Valle -Mexico City, DF
- Hospital Ángeles Mexico- Mexico City, DF
- Hospital Ángeles Lindavista - Mexico City, DF
- Hospital Ángeles del Pedregal - Mexico City, DF
- Hospital Ángeles Mocel - Mexico City, DF
- Hospital MAC Periferico Sur MAC HEALTH S.A.P.I. DE C.V. - Mexico City, DF
- Hospital Ángeles Lomas - Mexico City, DF
- Hospital Ángeles Metropolitano - Mexico City, DF
- Hospital Ángeles Clínica Londres - Mexico City, DF
- Hospital de Especialidades Dr. Belisario Domínguez SSGDF - Mexico City, DF
- Hospital Español - Mexico City, DF
- Hospital General de México - Mexico City, DF

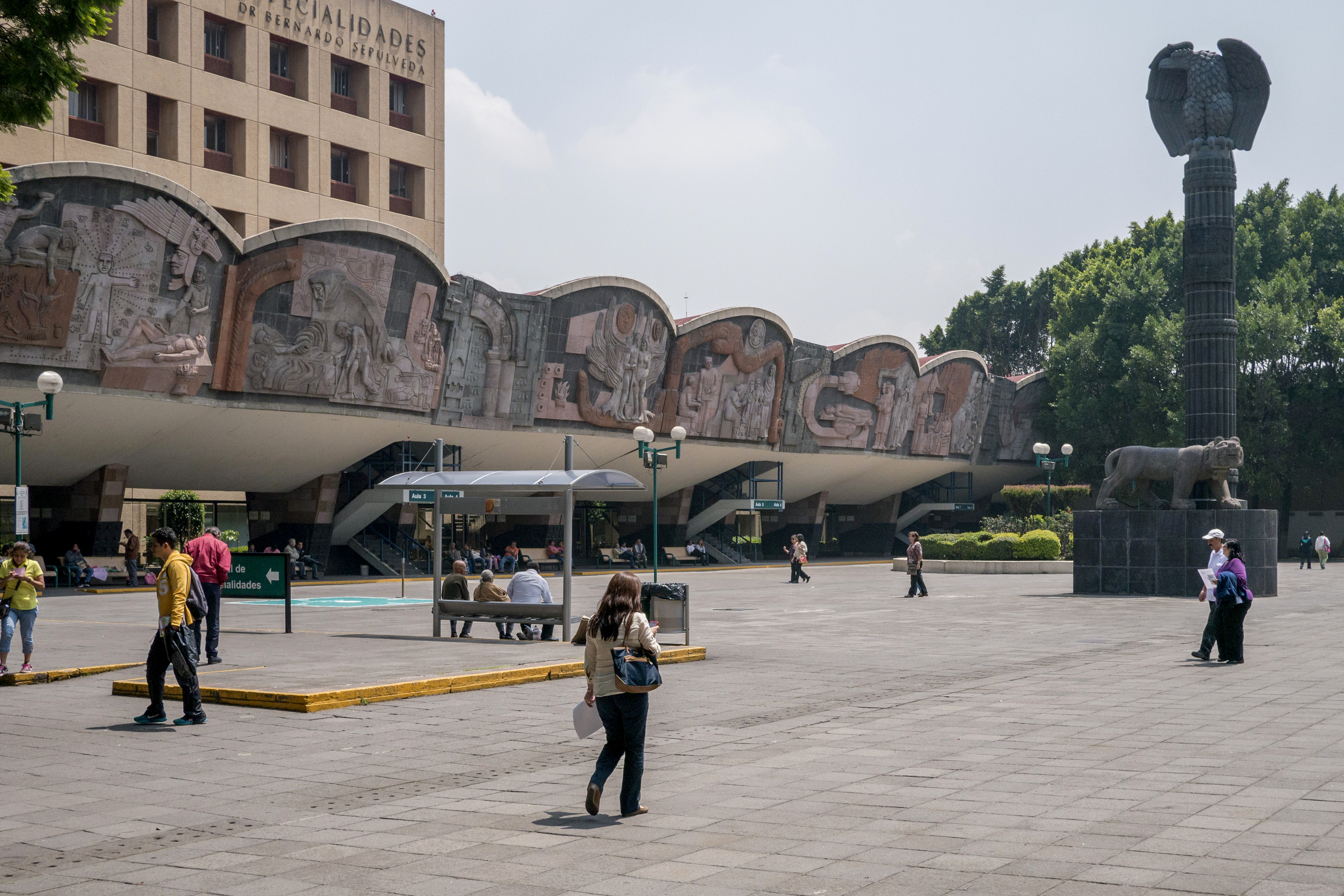
Centro Médico Nacional Siglo XXI

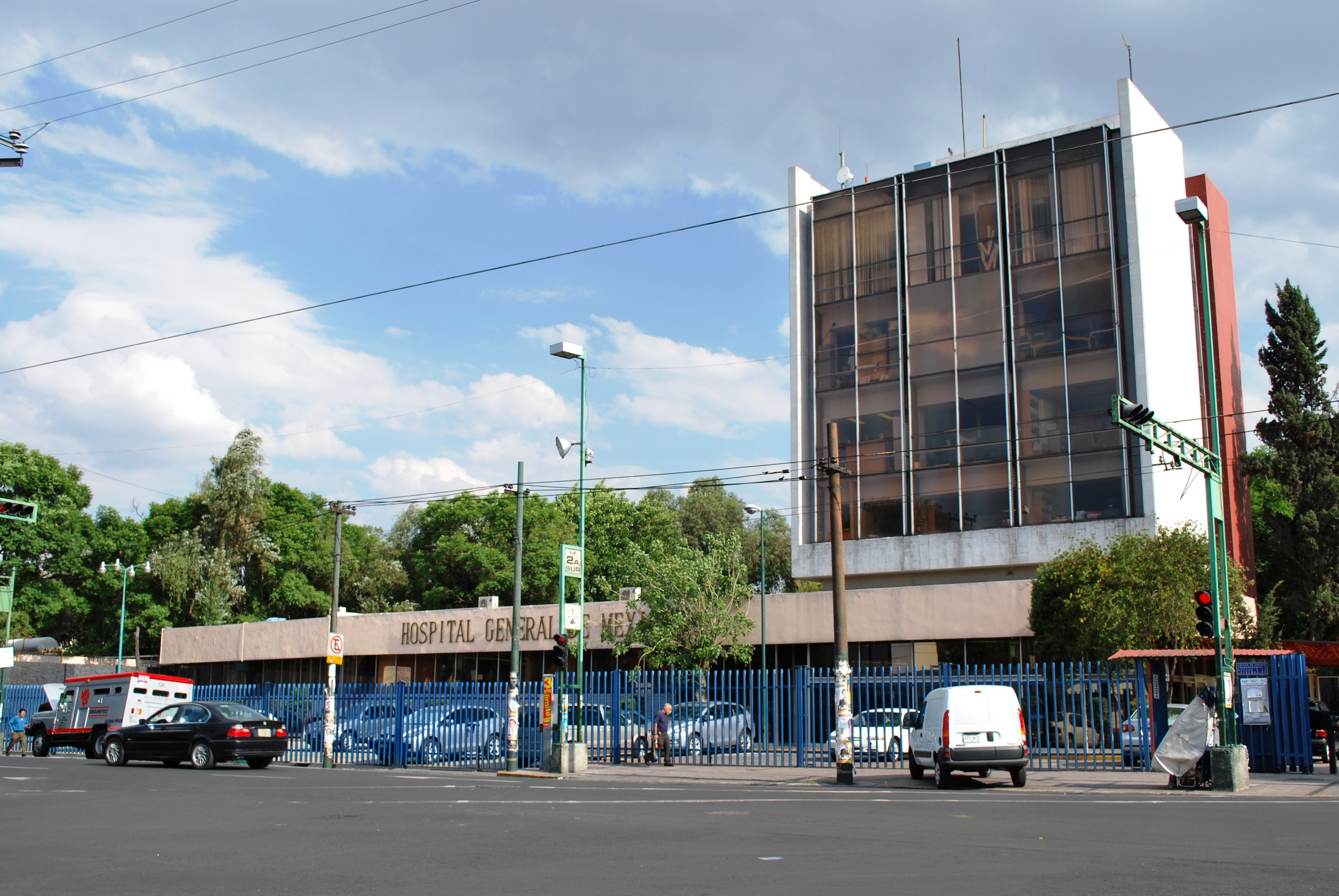
Hospital General de México, located on Dr Balmis street near Avenida Cuauhtémoc and Metro station Hospital General.

- Hospital Central Militar - Lomas de Sotelo, Mexico City DF
- Hospital General Dr. Enrique Cabrera SSGDF - Mexico City, DF
- Hospital General Dr. Gregorio Salas SSGDF - Mexico City, DF
- Hospital General Dr. Rubén Leñero SSGDF - Mexico City, DF
- Hospital General Iztapalapa SSGDF - Mexico City, DF
- Hospital General La Villa SSGDF - Mexico City, DF
- Hospital General Milpa Alta SSGDF - Mexico City, DF
- Hospital General Ticomán SSGDF - Mexico City, DF
- Hospital General Xoco SSGDF - Mexico City, DF
- Hospital General Balbuena SSGDF - Mexico City, DF
- Hospital Pediatrico Tacubaya SSGDF - Mexico City, DF
- Hospital Pediatrico Coyoacán SSGDF - Mexico City, DF
- Hospital Pediatrico Legaria SSGDF - Mexico City, DF
- Hospital Pediatrico Iztapalapa SSGDF - Mexico City, DF
- Hospital Pediatrico Villa SSGDF - Mexico City, DF
- Hospital Materno Infantil Cuautepec SSGDF - Mexico City, DF

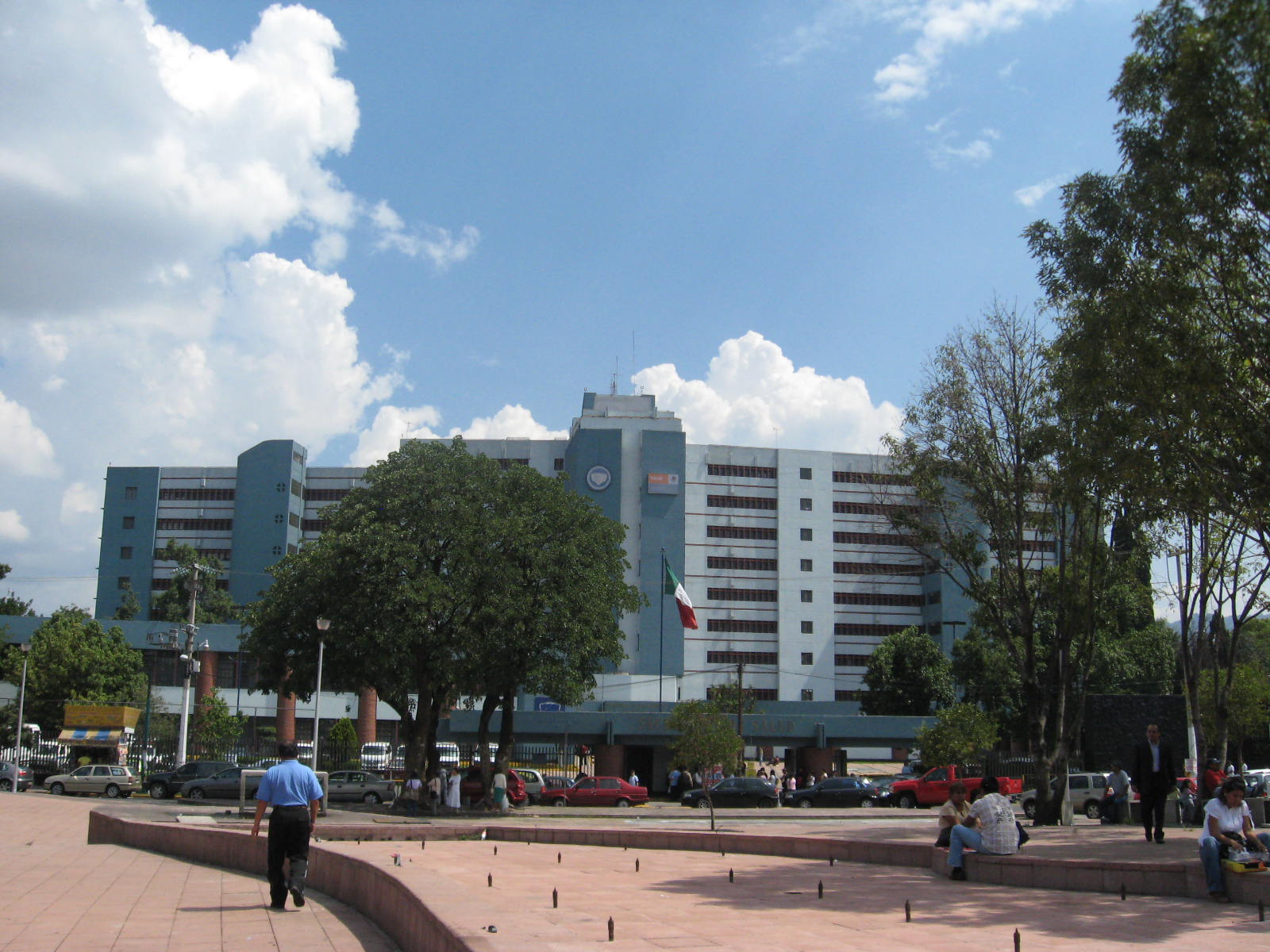
Hospital Psiquiátrico Fray Bernardino Álvarez.

- Hospital Psiquiátrico Fray Bernardino Álvarez - Tlalpan, Mexico City, DF
- Hospital Materno-Infantil Inguarán - Mexico City, DF
- Hospital Infantil de México Federico Gómez - Mexico City, DF
- Hospital Juárez de México - Mexico City, DF
- Hospital Central Vértiz Navarte - Dr. Vértiz 995, Col. Vértiz Narvarte, CP 03020
- Hospital de México - Agrarismo 208, Col. Escandón, 11800 México, DF.
- Hospital Español Sociedad de Beneficencia Española I - AV. EJÉRCITO NACIONAL 613 COL. GRANADA C.P.11560
- Hospital Infantil Privado SA de CV - RIO BECERRA 97 COL. NAPOLES C.P.03810
- Hospital María José SA de CV - LAS AGUILAS 101 103 COL. SAN ANGEL C.P.01010
- Hospital Merlos SA de CV - AVE ESTADIO AZTECA NO 179 COL. CARACOL C.P.04660
- Hospital MIG SA de CV - RÍO BAMBA 800 COL. LINDAVISTA C.P.07300
- Hospital Santa Coleta - SATURNINO HERRAN 59 - S COL. SN JOSE INSURGENTES C.P.03900
- Hospital Santa Elena - QUERÉTARO 58 COL. ROMA C.P.06700
- Hospital Santa Fe SA de CV - SAN LUIS POTOSÍ 143 PB COL. ROMA NTE C.P.06700
- Hospital Santa Mónica - TEMISTOCLES 210 COL. POLANCO C.P.11550
- Hospital Tehuantepec - TEHUANTEPEC 139 COL. ROMA SUR C.P.06760
- Hospital Gineco-Obstetricia # 4 -Río Magdalena No. 289 y Av. Revolución Col. Tizapán San Ángel Del. Álvaro Obregón
- Hospital General de Zona # 8 -Río Magdalena No. 289 y Av. RevoluciónCol. Tizapán San Ángel Del. Álvaro Obregón
- Hospital de Urgencias Traumatológicas -Torres Adalid 1305, esq. Pestalozzi Col. Del Valle Del. Benito Juárez,
- Hospital General de Zona Los Venados - Municipio Libre No. 270, Esq. División del Norte, Col. Portales, Del. Benito Juárez,
- Hospital Infantil Universitario - Universidad Autónoma de Coahuila, Torreón, Coah.
- Hospital Psiquiátrico -Calzada de Tlalpan No. 931, Col. Niños Héroes de Chapultepec, Del. Benito Juárez
- Hospital Regional #1, Gabriel Mancera - Gabriel Mancera No. 222 Esq. Xola, Col. Del Valle, Del. Benito Juárez
- Hospital General de Zona # 32 - Calzada del Hueso s/n Esq. División del Norte, Col. Villa Coapa, Del. Coyoacán,
- Hospital General de Zona # 27 - Eje Central Lázaro Cárdenas 445, Col. Unidad Nonoalco Tlatelolco, Del. Cuauhtémoc
- Tlatelolco -Eje Central No. 445, entre Manuel González y Flores Magón, U.H. Nonoalco Tlatelolco, Del. Cuauhtémoc
- Hospital Centro Médico Nacional La Raza - Calzada Vallejo y Jacarandas, Col. La Raza, Del. Gustavo A. Madero
- Hospital Magdalena de Las Salinas - Av. Fortuna e Instituto Politecnico Nacional, Col. Magdalena de Las Salinas Del. Gustavo A. Madero
- Hospital General de Zona # 30 - Av. Plutarco Elías Calles No. 473, Col. Santa Anita, Del. Iztacalco
- Hospital General de Zona # 25 - Calzada Ignacio Zaragoza No. 1840, Col. Juan Escutia, Del. Iztapalapa
- Hospital General de Zona # 47 - Combate de Celaya y Campaña de Lí¬bano, Col. Unidad Habitacional Vicente Guerrero, Del. Iztapalapa
- Hospital General Universitario - Universidad Autónoma de Coahuila, Av. Juarez 900 Ote, Torreón, Coahuila
- Hospital Psiquiátrico San Fernando - Av. San Fernando No. 201, Col. Toriello Guerra, Del. Tlalpan
- Hospital General de Zona Francisco del Paso - Añil No. 144, Esq. Francisco del Paso y Troncoso, Col. Granjas México, Del. Iztacalco
- Mexico City Shriners Hospital - Mexico City, DF
- Hospital Obregón - on Av. Álvaro Obregon Colonia Roma Mexico City
- Sanatorio Malinalco SA de CV - Hidalgo 45, Col. Azcapotzalco, CP 02000
- Sanatorio Moisés Lira - Boston 98, Col. Nochebuena, CP 03720
- Sanatorio Rougier AC - Revolución 380, Col. San Pedro de los Pinos, CP 01180
- Sanatorio Santa Teresa Zacatecas SA de CV - ZACATECAS 124 COL. ROMA C.P.06700
- Sanatorio Vista Alegre SA de CV - MONTES 60 COL. PORTALES C.P.03300
- Sanatorio Oftalmológico Mérida SA de CV - CHIHUAHUA 71 COL. ROMA C.P.06700
- Sanatorio DEL POTRO NUMERO ONCE

== Quintana Roo ==
- Amerimed Hospital - Cancún, Quintana Roo
- Galenia Hospital -Cancun, Quintana Roo
- Hospital Amat - Cancún, Quintana Roo
- Hospital Americano - Cancún, Quintana Roo
- Regional Hospital - Cancún, Quintana Roo
- Hospiten International Hospital Group, Cancún y Riviera Maya, Quintana roo
- Quirurgica del Sur -Cancun, Quintana Roo

== Jalisco ==
- Amerimed Hospital - Puerto Vallarta, Jalisco
- Guadalajara Civil Hospital - Guadalajara, Jalisco
- Hospital Ángeles del Carmen - Guadalajara, Jalisco
- Hospital Mexico Americano - Guadalajara, Jalisco
- Santa Maria Chapalita- Guadalajara, Jalisco
- Hospital San Javier - Guadalajara, Jalisco
- Hospital San Javier Marina - Puerto Vallarta, Jalisco
- Hospital Angel Leaño - Guadalajara, Jalisco
- Hospital Ramon Garibay - Guadalajara, Jalisco
- Hospital Terranova - Guadalajara, Jalisco
- Hospital Real San Jose - Guadalajara, Jalisco
- Hospital MAC Guadalajara MAC HEALTH S.A.P.I. DE C.V. - Bernardette - Guadalajara, Jalisco
- Centro Médico Puerta de Hierro - Guadalajara, Jalisco
- Centro Medico Nacional de Occidente CMNO IMSS - Guadalajara, Jalisco

== Aguascalientes ==
- Hospital MAC - CMQ [MAC HEALTH S.A.P.I. DE C.V. - Aguascalientes, Aguascalientes

== Baja California ==
- Amerimed Hospital - Cabo San Lucas, Baja California
- Amerimed Hospital - San José de los Cabos, Baja California
- Grupo Medico de La Piedad Centro, S.C. - Tijuana, Baja California
- Grupo Médico de la Piedad S. de R.L. de C.V. Tijuana, Baja California.
- Centro Hospitalario Internacional Pacifico - Tijuana, Baja California
- Centro Medico Excel - Tijuana, Baja California

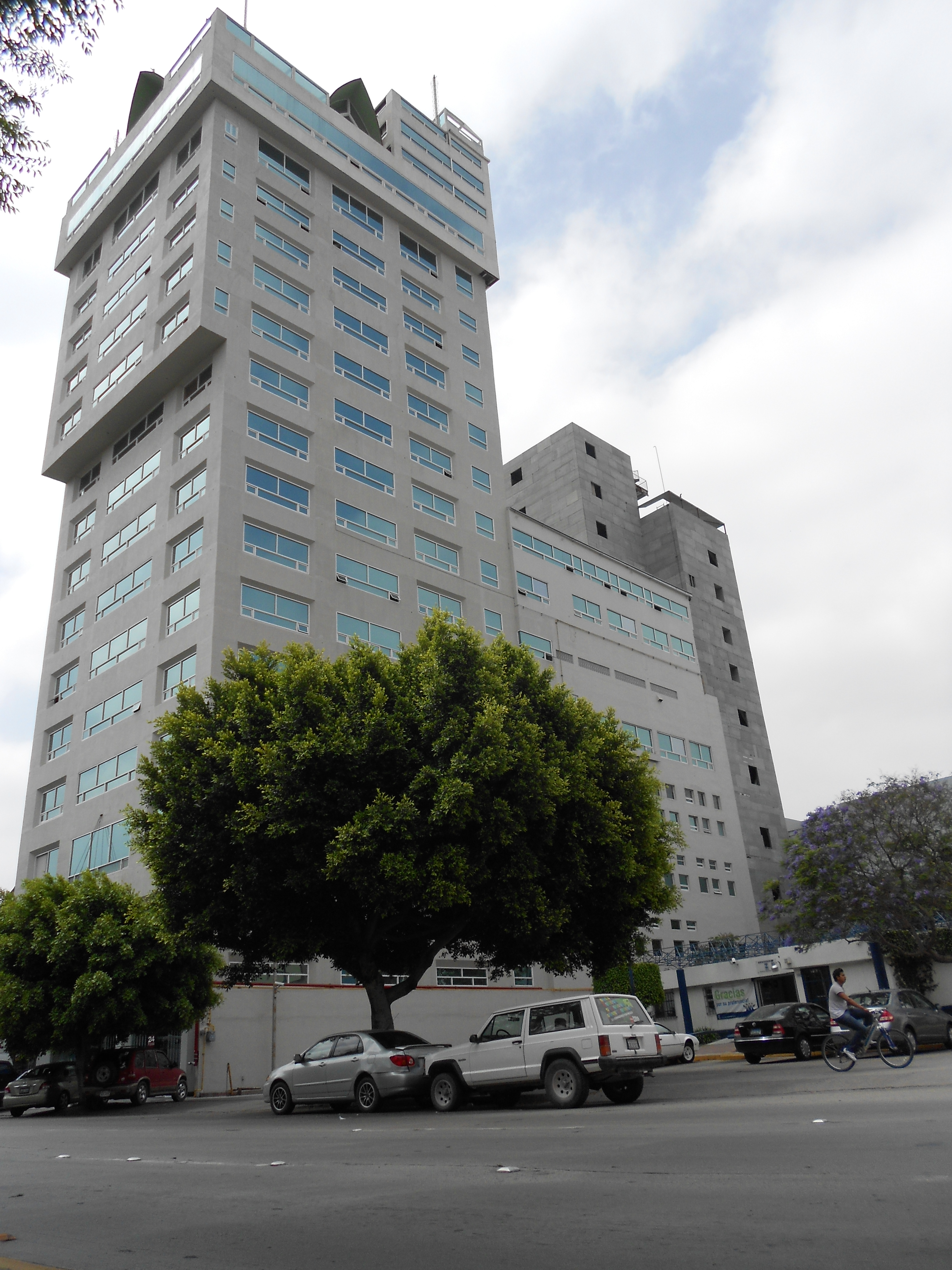
Centro Medico Excel, located on Av. Paseo de los Heroes No. 2507 Zona Río. Tijuana B.C..

- Hospital Ángeles - Tijuana, Baja California
- Hospital Guadalajara - Tijuana, Baja California
- Hospital Almater -Mexicali, Baja California
- Weight Loss Hospital - Tijuana, Baja California
- Hospital MAC Mexicali MAC HEALTH S.A.P.I. DE C.V. - Mexicali, Baja California
- Clínica Macuspana - Mexicali, Baja California
- Hospital HispanoAmericano - Mexicali, Baja California
- Hospital San Angel -Mexicali, Baja California
- Hospital de las Californias -Mexicali, Baja California
- Hospital del Desierto -Mexicali, Baja California
- Hospital San Andrés - Mexicali, Baja California
- Sanoviv Medical Institute - Rosarito Beach, Baja California

== Chihuahua ==
- Hospital Ángeles - Ciudad Juarez
- Hospital Cima - Chihuahua

== Sinaloa ==
- Hospital Ángeles - Culiacan

== Guanajuato ==
- Hospital Ángeles - Leon
- Hospital Aranda de la Parra - Leon
- Hospital MAC Celaya MAC HEALTH S.A.P.I. DE C.V.- Celaya, Guanajuato
- Hospital MAC Irapuato MAC HEALTH S.A.P.I. DE C.V.- Irapuato, Guanajuato
- Hospital MAC SMA MAC HEALTH S.A.P.I. DE C.V.- San Miguel de Allende, Guanajuato

Hospital La Joya San Miguel de Allende

== Puebla ==
- Hospital Ángeles - Puebla
- Hospital MAC Puebla MAC HEALTH S.A.P.I. DE C.V.- Puebla, Puebla

== Querétaro ==
- Hospital Ángeles - Querétaro
- Hospital General de Querétaro
- Hospital de Especialidades
- Hospital IMSS
- Hospital ISSSTE
- Hospital San José
- Hospital San José Sur
- Hospital Médica Tec 100
- Hospital de la Santa Cruz
- Hospital del Sagrado Corazón
- Hospital Santiago de Querétaro

== Michoacán ==
Morelia

- Hospital Psiquiatricos- Morelia (Miguel Arreola 450 Poblado Ocousen, 58279 Morelia, Michoacán, Mexico)
- Hospital Ángeles Morelia
- Hospital Memorial
- Hospital de la Luz

Zamora

- Hospital Santa María - Zamora
- Hospital Municipal

Uruapan

- Hospital San Miguel
- Hospital Fray San Juan

Pétzcuaro

- Hospital San José
- IMSS Patzcuaro
- Clinica Don Vasco

Lázaro Cárdenas

- Hospital General
- Hospital IMSS
- ISSTEE Lázaro Cárdenas

Apatzingan

- Hospital Apatzingan
- Hospital IMSS Apatzingan

Sahuayo

- Hospital Santa María Sahuayo
- Hospital ISSTEE Sahuayo
- Hospital Futura Medica
- Hospital Sagrado Corazon

== Nuevo Leon ==
- Hospital Sierra Madre - Monterrey, Nuevo León
- Hospital Santa Engracia - Monterrey, Nuevo León
- Hospital San José Tec de Monterrey - Monterrey, Nuevo León
- Hospital Oca - Monterrey, Nuevo León
- Doctors Hospital - Monterrey, Nuevo León
- Hospital Zambrano Hellion - Monterrey, Nuevo León
- Hospital Christus Muguerza - Monterrey, Nuevo León

== Oaxaca ==
- Hospital General Aurelio Valdivieso - Oaxaca, Oaxaca

== Sonora ==
HERMOSILLO

- Hospital General del Estado de Sonora.
- Hospital Infantil del Estado de Sonora.
- Hospital Integral de la Mujer del Estado de Sonora, Hermosillo.
- Instituto Mexicano del Seguro Social, Hospital General de Zona No. 2, Hermosillo.
- Instituto Mexicano del Seguro Social, Hospital General de Zona No. 14, Hermosillo.
- Sanatorio Licona, Hermosillo.
- Hospital CIMA Hermosillo
- Hospital San José
- Hospital General de Especialidades
- Clínica del Noroeste
- Hospital San Diego de Alcalá
- Hospital San Benito
- Hospital Chávez

CIUDAD OBREGÓN

- Instituto Mexicano del Seguro Social, Hospital General Regional No. 1.
- Instituto Mexicano del Seguro Social, Unidad Médica de Alta Especialidad No. 2.

NAVOJOA

- Clinica Hospital San José de Navojoa, Navojoa, Sonora MEXICO
- Sanatorio Lourdes, Navojoa, Sonora MEXICO

== Coahuila ==
- Sanatorio Español, Torreon, Coahuila
- Hospital Ángeles - Torreon

== Tabasco ==
- Hospital AIR - Villahermosa
- Hospital Ángeles - Villahermosa
- Hospital del Sureste - Villahermosa
- Hospital Nuestra Señora de Guadalupe - Villahermosa
- Hospital Privado Santa Fe - Villahermosa

== Nayarit ==
- Hospital General de Zona numero 1 "Luis Ernesto Miramontes Cardenas" del IMSS - Tepic

== Veracruz ==
- Hospital Español de Veracruz (Sociedad Española de Beneficencia de Veracruz) Sociedad_Española_de_Beneficencia_de_Veracruz
- Hospital Regional de Alta Especialidad
- Hospital General de Boca del Río
- Instituto Mexicano del Seguro Social
