= Narciso Bassols =

Mexican politician

Narciso Bassols García (October 22, 1897 – July 24, 1959) was a Mexican lawyer, socialist politician, ambassador to France, the Soviet Union, and the United Kingdom, and professor of law at the National Autonomous University of Mexico. He co-founded the Popular Party (Spanish: Partido Popular), and the League of Political Action (Spanish: Liga de Acción Política). Bassols is most noted for his role in socializing the country's public education system.

Narciso Bassols, born in Tenango del Valle, State of Mexico, was an atheist and the nephew of Sebastián Lerdo de Tejada. As author of the Agrarian Law of 1927, Bassols fought for agrarian reform and is noted as stating of the long suffering Mayan people: "hundreds of infamies, deceptions, Socialist mystifications, mass murders, immortal and ostentatious corruptions, banquets of bureaucrats, and Roman orgies all practiced by Socialist compañeros."

== National Autonomous University of Mexico ==
Narciso Bassols presence at National Autonomous University of Mexico (Spanish: Universidad Nacional Autónoma de México) (UNAM) began in 1920 when he attended the university in pursuit of a law degree. Prior to achieving his degree in 1931, he was given the position of Director of the UNAM Law School in 1928. As Director, Bassols attempted to implement a tri-semester system, which the student body rebelled against, forcing Bassols to resign. His interaction with UNAM continued as he is credited with founding of the National School of Economics, the details of which are contested by Daniel Cosío Villegas, a fellow UNAM graduate who claims credit in his own autobiography.

== Secretariat of Public Education ==
In 1931, at age 35, Bassols took position of Secretary of Public Education (Spanish: Secretaría de Educación Pública) By accepting this position, Bassols became the first Marxist to hold a ministerial office in Mexico.

=== Rural schools ===
Bassols, in addition to other changes to the education system, began to alter the manner in which school prepared rural students. Bassols argued "a hungry Indian cannot be turned into a good scholar, and, furthermore, his studies only have value in so far as they aid him completely to transform his economic life". Bassols believed that schools should rely less on the classics of Dewey, and more on practical skills and technical knowledge. Motivated partially by the onset of world recession in 1929, Bassols felt a greater emphasis should be placed on the teachings of better production methods for satisfaction of local needs. To accomplish this he began integrating the already existing normal schools, agricultural centers, and cultural missions into unitary "Regional Peasant Schools." To accomplish this integration, Bassols brought on Juan O'Gorman to be Head of Architectural Office of the Ministry of Public Education in 1932. O'Gorman was tasked with building 24 schools in the Federal District between 1932 and 1935, following the style he described as "eliminating all architectural style and executing constructions technically". Bassols believed the change in rural education went hand in hand with the agrarian reform he pushed for, and intended to provide knowledge and skills to Indians. Bassols is noted as believing that mans life revolved around economics.

=== Role of religion ===
During Bassols tenure as Secretariat of Public Education, he began a process of revamping the education system. One of the first policies implemented was a stricter following of Article 3 of the constitution, specifically the portion modified to read as follows:

"The education that the State delivers will be socialist and, besides of excluding and religious doctrine, will fight fanaticism and prejudices, for that reason school will organize its teaching and all activities in a way that allows us to create in young people a rational and exact concept of the Universe and social life"

Bassols began to ban religious teachings in schools, and ordering the removal of religious iconography removed as well. In instituting his policy Bassols ordered schools who failed to comply to be fined and/or closed. Bassols argued that schools should substituted religious teachings with "true, scientific, and rational knowledge," his ideas following in line with Karl Marx's maxim that religion is an "opiate of the masses."

On December 29, 1931, Congress passed a law, crafted by Bassols, that extended state control over schools affiliated, or incorporated, into the federal system. Through this law Bassols instituted further changes, restricting the role of church in all accredited schools, and invalidating diplomas from non affiliated schools, listing them as no longer suitable for admission into state run universities. Through the wording of Article 3, Bassols argued further that members of the clergy could not continue to teach in affiliated schools, stating by their nature, they would influence young children.

=== Sex education ===
In 1932, the Mexican Eugenics Society reported to Bassols that it found a high frequency of unwanted pregnancies and abortions in adolescents lacking a complete understanding of their actions. In 1934, Bassols acted on the information and instituted Mexico's first systematic sex education program. The program drew the ire of the National Parents Union (Spanish: Unión Nacional de Padres de Familia) (UNPF). The UNPF began petitioning against the program to no avail, in addition, citing the program as a communist plot. Eventually the UNPF began encouraging students of both sexes to boycott the classes.

In May 1934, Bassols resigned the position of Secretary of Education. In his resignation he censured teachers who opposed the implementation of tenure, and promotions based on ability, training, and performance.

== Foreign diplomat ==
In 1934, following Bassols' resignation, he accepted the position of Secretary of the Interior briefly before moving on to Secretary of Finance between 1934 and 1935. In 1935, then President Lázaro Cárdenas, cited as finding Bassols Marxist zeal inconvenient, gave him the position of Ambassador to the United Kingdom where he served until 1937. Before moving on to a position as Ambassador to France in 1938, Bassols served as Mexico's delegate to the League of Nations. While there, Bassols condemned Mussolini's invasion of Ethiopia, denounced the Munich Agreement as a "capitulation" and "infamy" and supported the Molotov-Von Ribbentrop nonaggression treaty. In 1939, Bassols resigned the position, brought on by the news that Leon Trotsky had been granted asylum by Cárdenas, he is cited as feeling betrayed, at the time representing Mexico in talks in Geneva with Soviet foreign minister Maxim Maximovich Litvinov. The talks were called off as Litvinoff discovered that Trotsky had been granted asylum. Cardenas attempted to offer Bassols the position of Ambassador to Spain, however Bassols refused to speak or meet with Cárdenas, and further refused to accept the position. Bassols returned to Mexico where he stayed until 1944. In 1944, Bassols was assigned to be the Ambassador to the Soviet Union where he stood until his resignation in 1946.

== Popular Socialist Party ==
In June 1948, Bassols, along with Vicente Lombardo Toledano, founded the Popular Party (Spanish: Partido Popular), due to perceived corruption in the ruling Institutional Revolutionary Party (Spanish: Partido Revolucionario Institucional, PRI). In 1949 the Popular Party participated in its first legislative elections in Sonora. The election was won, however the government refused to recognize the victory and instead offered the Popular Party a single seat in the Chamber of Deputies. Bassols condemned the situation, stating the Popular Party could not behave like the National Action Party (Spanish: Partido Acción Nacional, PAN), he is quoted as saying he would not accept "the crumbs of three or four seats." Lombardo however took a more conciliatory attitude, causing Bassols to separate from the group, abandoning his position as Vice President of the Popular Party. The Popular Party was later renamed in 1960 to the Popular Socialist Party (Spanish: Partido Popular Socialista, PPS).
