= Outline of Mexico =

Country in North America

The Flag of Mexico

The Coat of arms of Mexico

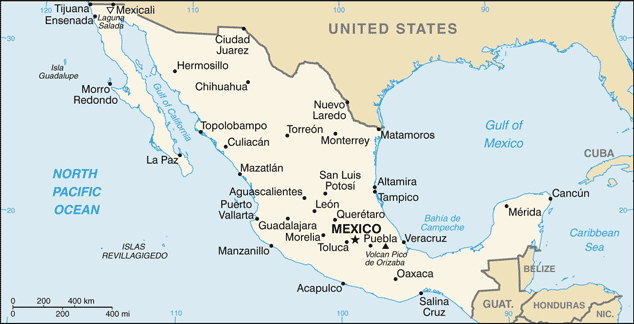
An enlargeable map of Mexico

The following outline is provided as an overview of and topical guide to Mexico:

The United Mexican States, commonly known as Mexico, is a federal constitutional republic located in North America. It is bound on the north by the United States; on the south and west by the North Pacific Ocean; on the southeast by Guatemala, Belize, and the Caribbean Sea; and on the east by the Gulf of Mexico.

== General reference ==
- Pronunciation: /ˈmɛksɪkoʊ/
  - Spanish: [ˈme.xi.ko]
- Common English country name: Mexico
- Official English country name: United Mexican States
- Common endonym: México
- Official endonym: Estados Unidos Mexicanos
- Adjectival: Mexican
- Demonym(s):
- Etymology: Name of Mexico
- International rankings of Mexico
  - Area and size ranking: covering almost 2 million square kilometers, Mexico is the fifth-largest country in the Americas by total area and the 14th largest in the world.
  - 10th most populous country
  - Most populous Spanish-speaking country in the world
  - Mexico is the 12th largest economy in the world by gross domestic product (GDP) by purchasing power parity
- ISO country codes: MX, MEX, 484
- ISO region codes: See ISO 3166-2:MX
- Internet country code top-level domain: .mx

== Geography of Mexico ==
An enlargeable topographic map of Mexico.

Geography of Mexico

- Mexico is: a megadiverse country
- Location:
  - Northern Hemisphere, Western Hemisphere
    - Americas
      - North America
        - Middle America
  - Time zones:
    - Time Zone 1 – UTC-06, summer UTC-05
    - Time Zone 2 – UTC-07, summer UTC-06
    - Time Zone 3 – UTC-08, summer UTC-07
  - Extreme points of Mexico
    - High: Pico de Orizaba 5,636 m (18,491 ft)
    - Low: Laguna Salada −10 m (−33 ft)
  - Land boundaries: 4,353 km

United States 3,141 km
Guatemala 962 km
Belize 250 km

- Coastline: 9,330 km

- Population of Mexico: 106,682,500 people (mid-2008 estimate) - 11th most populous country
- Area of Mexico: 1,972,550 km^{2} (761,610 sq mi) - 15th largest country
- Atlas of Mexico

=== Environment of Mexico ===
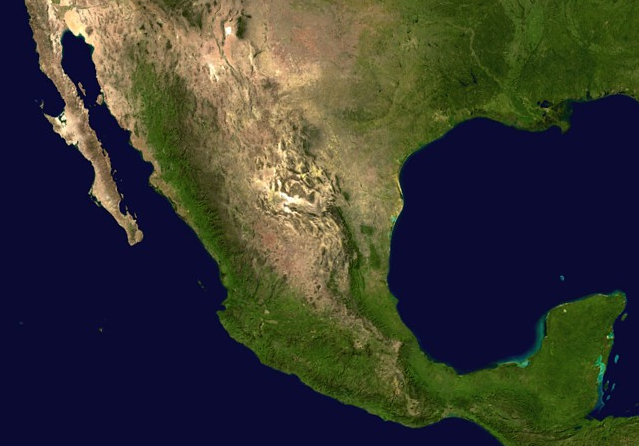
An enlargeable satellite image of Mexico

- Climate of Mexico
- Environmental issues in Mexico
- Green building in Mexico
- Ecoregions in Mexico
- Renewable energy in Mexico
- Geology of Mexico
- National parks of Mexico
- Protected areas of Mexico
- Wildlife of Mexico
  - Fauna of Mexico
    - Birds of Mexico
    - Mammals of Mexico

==== Geographic features of Mexico ====
- Baja California peninsula
- Yucatán Peninsula
- Gulf Coast of Mexico
- Islands of Mexico
- Lakes of Mexico
- Mountain peaks of Mexico
  - The 9 Highest mountain peaks of Mexico
  - The 28 Most prominent mountain peaks of Mexico
  - The 32 Most isolated mountain peaks of Mexico
  - Volcanoes of Mexico
- Rivers of Mexico
  - Waterfalls of Mexico
- Valleys of Mexico
- World Heritage Sites in Mexico

==== Ecoregions of Mexico ====
List of ecoregions in Mexico

- Ecoregions in Mexico

==== Administrative divisions of Mexico ====
Administrative divisions of Mexico

- States of Mexico
  - Municipalities of Mexico
- Mexican Federal District (Mexico City)
  - Boroughs of the Mexican Federal District

===== States of Mexico =====
- Mexican states by area
- Mexican states by Human Development Index
- Mexican states by population
- Municipalities of Mexico

The United Mexican States is a federation comprising thirty-one states and a federal district (postal codes are in parentheses):

- Aguascalientes (Ags.)
- Baja California (BC)
- Baja California Sur (BCS)
- Chihuahua (Chih.)
- Colima (Col.)
- Campeche (Camp.)
- Coahuila (Coah.)
- Chiapas (Chis.)
- Ciudad de México (CDMX)
- Durango (Dgo.)
- Guerrero (Gro.)
- Guanajuato (Gto.)
- Hidalgo (Hgo.)
- Jalisco (Jal.)
- Michoacán (Mich.)
- Morelos (Mor.)
- México (Mex or Edomex)
- Nayarit (Nay.)
- Nuevo León (NL)
- Oaxaca (Oax.)
- Puebla (Pue.)
- Quintana Roo (QR)
- Querétaro (Qro.)
- Sinaloa (Sin.)
- San Luis Potosí (SLP)
- Sonora (Son.)
- Tabasco (Tab.)
- Tlaxcala (Tlax.)
- Tamaulipas (Tamps.)
- Veracruz (Ver.)
- Yucatán (Yuc.)
- Zacatecas (Zac.)
Location of Mexico's states and federal district:

===== Mexico City =====
- Mexico City (Mexico City / CDMX)
  - Boroughs of the Mexican Federal District
    - Colonias of Mexico City

===== Municipalities of Mexico =====
Municipalities of Mexico

- Cities of Mexico
- Capital: Mexico City (one of the world's most populous cities).

=== Demography of Mexico ===
Demographics of Mexico

- Mexican people
- Immigration to Mexico

== Government and politics of Mexico ==
Politics of Mexico

- Form of government: federal presidential and congressional multi-party representative democratic republic
- Head of state: President of Mexico, Claudia Sheinbaum
- Head of government: President of Mexico, Claudia Sheinbaum
- Capital of Mexico: Mexico City
- Elections in Mexico
  - 1988 - 1991 - 1994 - 1997 - 2000 - 2003 - 2004 - 2005 - 2006 - 2007 - 2008 - 2009 - 2012 - 2018
- Political parties in Mexico

=== Branches of the government of Mexico ===
Government of Mexico

==== Executive branch of the government of Mexico ====
- President of Mexico
- Mexican Executive Cabinet

==== Legislative branch of the government of Mexico ====
- Congress of Mexico (bicameral)
  - Upper house: Senate of Mexico
  - Lower house: Chamber of Deputies of Mexico
- LXII Legislature of the Mexican Congress (62nd and current legislature)

==== Judicial branch of the government of Mexico ====
Court system of Mexico

- Supreme Court of Justice of the Nation

=== Foreign relations of Mexico ===
Foreign relations of Mexico

- Diplomatic missions in Mexico
- Diplomatic missions of Mexico
- United States-Mexico relations

==== International organization membership ====
The United Mexican States is a member of:

- Agency for the Prohibition of Nuclear Weapons in Latin America and the Caribbean (OPANAL)
- Andean Community of Nations (CAN) (observer)
- Asia-Pacific Economic Cooperation (APEC)
- Bank for International Settlements (BIS)
- Caribbean Community and Common Market (Caricom) (observer)
- Caribbean Development Bank (CDB)
- Central American Bank for Economic Integration (BCIE)
- Central American Integration System (SICA) (observer)
- Council of Europe (CE) (observer)
- European Bank for Reconstruction and Development (EBRD)
- Food and Agriculture Organization (FAO)
- Group of Three (G3)
- Group of 15 (G15)
- Group of 24 (G24)
- Group of Twenty Finance Ministers and Central Bank Governors (G20)
- Inter-American Development Bank (IADB)
- International Atomic Energy Agency (IAEA)
- International Bank for Reconstruction and Development (IBRD)
- International Chamber of Commerce (ICC)
- International Civil Aviation Organization (ICAO)
- International Criminal Court (ICCt)
- International Criminal Police Organization (Interpol)
- International Development Association (IDA)
- International Federation of Red Cross and Red Crescent Societies (IFRCS)
- International Finance Corporation (IFC)
- International Fund for Agricultural Development (IFAD)
- International Hydrographic Organization (IHO)
- International Labour Organization (ILO)
- International Maritime Organization (IMO)
- International Mobile Satellite Organization (IMSO)
- International Monetary Fund (IMF)
- International Olympic Committee (IOC)
- International Organization for Migration (IOM)
- International Organization for Standardization (ISO)
- International Red Cross and Red Crescent Movement (ICRM)
- International Telecommunication Union (ITU)
- International Telecommunications Satellite Organization (ITSO)
- International Trade Union Confederation (ITUC)
- Inter-Parliamentary Union (IPU)
- Latin American Economic System (LAES)
- Latin American Integration Association (LAIA)
- Multilateral Investment Guarantee Agency (MIGA)
- Nonaligned Movement (NAM) (observer)
- North American Free Trade Agreement (NAFTA)
- Nuclear Energy Agency (NEA)
- Organisation for Economic Co-operation and Development (OECD)
- Organisation for the Prohibition of Chemical Weapons (OPCW)
- Organization of American States (OAS)
- Permanent Court of Arbitration (PCA)
- Rio Group (RG)
- South American Community of Nations (CSN) (observer)
- Unión Latina
- United Nations (UN)
- Union of South American Nations (UNASUR) (observer)
- United Nations Conference on Trade and Development (UNCTAD)
- United Nations Educational, Scientific, and Cultural Organization (UNESCO)
- United Nations High Commissioner for Refugees (UNHCR)
- United Nations Industrial Development Organization (UNIDO)
- Universal Postal Union (UPU)
- World Confederation of Labour (WCL)
- World Customs Organization (WCO)
- World Federation of Trade Unions (WFTU)
- World Health Organization (WHO)
- World Intellectual Property Organization (WIPO)
- World Meteorological Organization (WMO)
- World Tourism Organization (UNWTO)
- World Trade Organization (WTO)

=== Law and order in Mexico ===
Law of Mexico

- Capital punishment in Mexico
- Constitution of Mexico
- Crime in Mexico
- Human rights in Mexico
  - Lesbian Groups in Mexico
  - LGBT rights in Mexico
  - Freedom of religion in Mexico
- Law enforcement in Mexico

=== Military of Mexico ===
Military of Mexico

- Command
  - Commander-in-chief: President of Mexico
    - Secretariat of National Defense (directs only the Army, including Air Force)
    - Secretary of the Navy (Mexico)
- Forces
  - Army of Mexico
  - Air Force of Mexico
  - Navy of Mexico
    - Fuerza Naval del Golfo (Naval Force of the Gulf)
    - Fuerza Naval del Pacifico (Naval Force of the Pacific)
    - Fuerza Aeronaval (Navy Air Force)
  - Special forces of Mexico
- Mexican military ranks
- Military history of Mexico

=== Local government in Mexico ===
- Local government in Mexico

== History of Mexico ==
History of Mexico

- Timeline of the history of Mexico
- Current events of Mexico
- Economic history of Mexico
- Military history of Mexico
- History of the flags of Mexico

=== Chronologically ===
- Pre-Columbian Civilizations
  - Olmec, Olmec influences on Mesoamerican cultures
  - Teotihuacán
  - Maya civilization
  - Toltec
  - Aztec civilization (Mexica), History of the Aztecs
- First Franco-Mexican War
- Spanish Conquest of Mexico
- New Spain
- Mexican War of Independence
- Independent Mexico
- La Reforma
- French intervention in Mexico
- Restored Republic
- Porfiriato
- Mexican Revolution
- Modern Mexico

== Culture of Mexico ==
Culture of Mexico

- Architecture of Mexico
- Cuisine of Mexico
- Festivals in Mexico
- Mexican handcrafts and folk art
- Healthcare in Mexico
- Languages of Mexico
- Media in Mexico
- National symbols of Mexico
  - Coat of arms of Mexico
  - Flag of Mexico
  - National anthem of Mexico
- Prostitution in Mexico
- Public holidays in Mexico
- Records of Mexico
- Religion in Mexico
  - Buddhism in Mexico
  - Christianity in Mexico
  - Hinduism in Mexico
  - Islam in Mexico
  - Judaism in Mexico
  - Sikhism in Mexico
- World Heritage Sites in Mexico

=== Art in Mexico ===
- Mexican art
- Cinema of Mexico
- Literature of Mexico
- Music of Mexico
  - List of music artists and bands from Mexico
  - List of Mexican composers of classical music
- Television in Mexico
- Theatre in Mexico

=== Sports in Mexico ===
Sports in Mexico

- Football in Mexico
- Mexico at the Olympics

== Economy and infrastructure of Mexico ==
Economy of Mexico

- Economic rank: Mexico is the 12th largest economy in the world by gross domestic product (GDP) by purchasing power parity.
- Agriculture in Mexico
- Bank of Mexico (central bank)
- Communications in Mexico
  - Internet in Mexico
- Companies of Mexico
- Currency of Mexico: Peso
  - ISO 4217: MXN
- Economic history of Mexico
- Energy in Mexico
  - Petroleum industry in Mexico
- Health care in Mexico
- Mining in Mexico
- North American Free Trade Agreement - Mexico's economy is strongly linked to those of its NAFTA partners.
- Mexican Stock Exchange
- Tourism in Mexico
- Transport in Mexico
  - Airports in Mexico
  - Highway system of Mexico
  - Rail transport in Mexico
  - Seaports in Mexico
- Water supply and sanitation in Mexico

== Education in Mexico ==
Education in Mexico

== Health in Mexico ==
Health in Mexico

== See also ==
Mexico

- List of Mexico-related topics
- List of international rankings
- Member state of the Group of Twenty Finance Ministers and Central Bank Governors
- Member state of the United Nations
- Latin America
- Outline of South America
- Lists of country-related topics
- Topic outline of geography
- Topic outline of North America
