= Health and wealth =

== Public Medicine ==
- Health
- Prosperity#Synergistic notions of prosperity
- Savanna principle
- Socioeconomic status#Health
- Sociology of health and illness

=== Country specific ===
- Health in Mali
- Social determinants of health in Mexico
- Health care in the United States

== Sociological ==
- Satisfaction with Life Index, which shows a correlation to health and wealth

== Theology ==
- Prosperity theology
