= Zoé Robledo =

Mexican politician

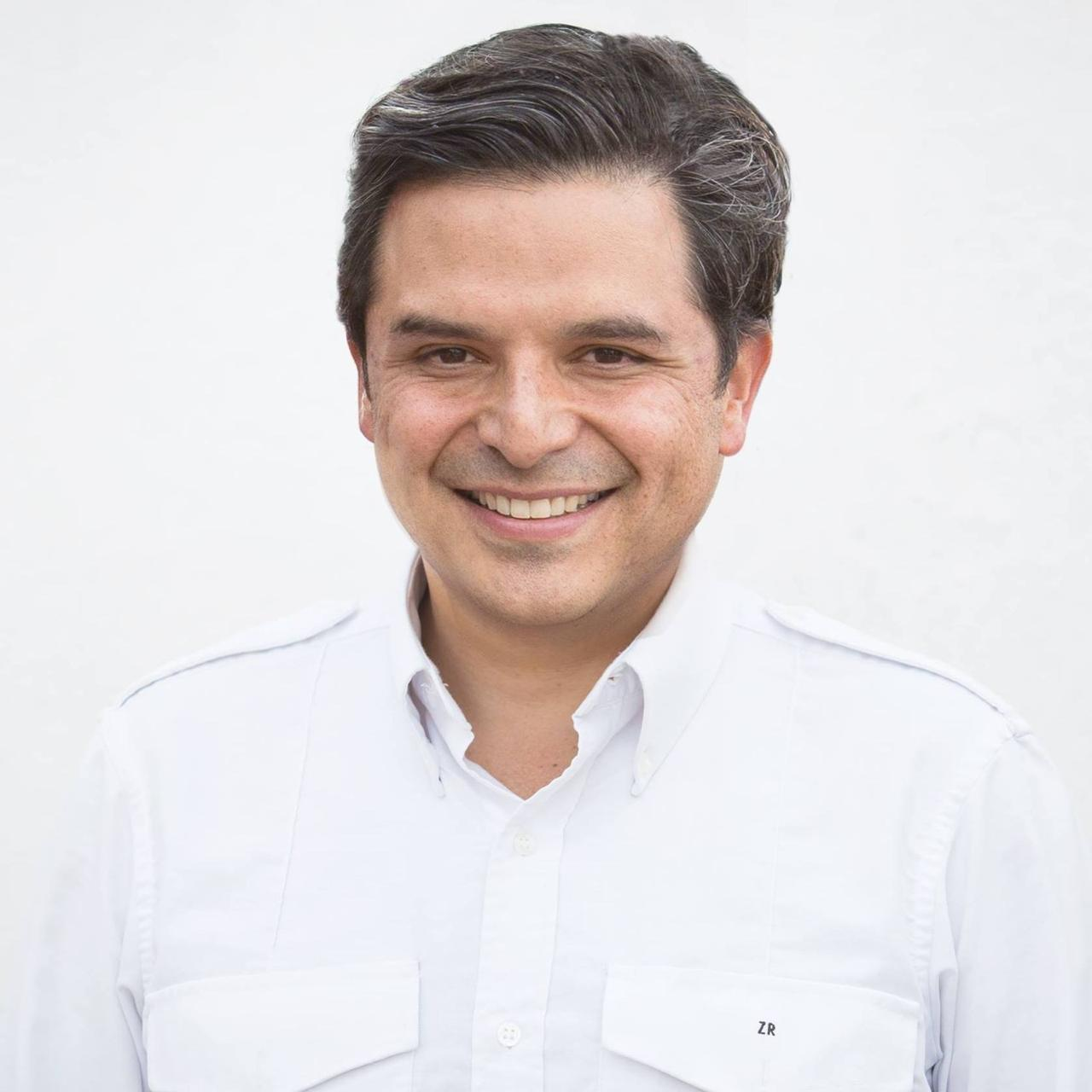
- Robledo in 2019

Director of the Mexican Social Security Institute
- Incumbent
- Assumed office 22 May 2019
- Preceded by: Germán Martínez Cázares

Deputy of the Congress of the Union for the 6th district of Chiapas
- In office 1 September 2018 – 8 November 2018
- Preceded by: Jorge Álvarez López
- Succeeded by: Raúl Eduardo Bonifaz Moedano

Senator of the Congress of the Union for Chiapas
- In office 1 September 2012 – 31 August 2018
- Preceded by: Rubén Velázquez López
- Succeeded by: Vacant

Personal details
- Born: 9 January 1979 (age 47) Tuxtla Gutiérrez, Chiapas, Mexico
- Party: MORENA (2017–present)
- Other political affiliations: Party of the Democratic Revolution (2000–2017)
- Occupation: Senator

Zoé Alejandro Robledo Aburto (born 9 January 1979) is a Mexican politician affiliated with the National Regeneration Movement (Morena).

Robledo Aburto was born in Tuxtla Gutiérrez, Chiapas, in 1979. He earned a first degree in political science from the Autonomous Technological Institute of Mexico (ITAM) and a masters in law from the National Autonomous University of Mexico (UNAM).

In the 2012 general election he was elected to the Senate for the state of Chiapas on the Party of the Democratic Revolution (PRD) ticket, and in the 2018 general election he was elected to the Chamber of Deputies to represent the sixth district of Chiapas for Morena.

He was appointed Undersecretary of the Interior in December 2018. On 22 May 2019 President Andrés Manuel López Obrador named him director of the Mexican Social Security Institute (IMSS), after the resignation of Germán Martínez Cázares.

On 7 June 2020, it was reported that Robledo Aburto had contracted COVID-19.

President-elect Claudia Sheinbaum announced on 25 July 2024 that Robledo would continue as director of the IMSS under her administration.
