= Germán Martínez (Mexican politician) =

Mexican lawyer and politician

Germán Martínez Cázares (born June 20, 1967) is a Mexican politician and lawyer. Born in Quiroga, Michoacán, he was a member of the National Action Party (PAN).

Martínez Cázares holds a degree in law from the Universidad La Salle. Has a Specialty in Constitutional Law and Political Sciences from the Center for Political and Constitutional Studies (Madrid). Pursued Doctoral Studies in Constitutional Law at the Universidad Complutense. He has given lectures on law and politics at Harvard University and various Mexican universities. Has also taught law at the Universidad Anáhuac.

== Political career ==
- Federal deputy during the 57th Congress (1997–2000), where he was President of the Population Commission and member of COCOPA.
- Federal deputy during the 59th Congress (2003–2006) where he was Assistant Coordinator for the National Action Party Parliamentary Group, member of the Commissions for Constitutional Points and Culture and the Committee for the Center for Legal Studies and Parliamentary Research and the Group of Friendship between Mexico and Spain.
- Within the National Action Party, he has been a member of the National Executive Committee, Secretary of Party Studies and Director General of the Rafael Preciado Hernández Foundation.
- He has written for several publications, including the El Economista newspaper and the weekly journal Proceso. He has coauthored a selection of texts on Carlos Castillo Peraza, published by the Fondo de Cultura Económica.
- He represented the National Action Party in the General Council of the Federal Electoral Institute in the 2000 and 2006 electoral processes.
- Member of president elect Felipe Calderón's transition team.
- 2007: Elected as the 19th party president. He resigned on July 6, 2009, because of the electoral defeat of his party in the 2009 mid-term elections.
- Legal director before the Consejo General del Instituto Federal Electoral (Federal Electoral Institute).
- 2018 general election: Elected to the Senate from Morena's national list.
- December 3, 2018: General Director of the Mexican Social Security Institute. On May 21, 2019, Martínez Cázares resigned, complaining of a lack of resources and blaming it on the austerity budget of the Secretariat of Finance (Hacienda). On May 22, he requested to be reinstated in the Senate, where he sat as an independent.
- Plurinominal member of the Chamber of Deputies for the PAN, 2024–2027.
