= Mario Luis Fuentes =

Mexican politician and economist

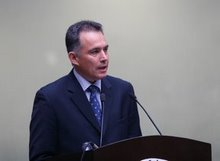
Mario Luis Fuentes Alcalá

Mario Luis Fuentes Alcalá (born 18 January 1956) is a Mexican politician and economist who served as Director-General of the Mexican Social Security Institute in 2000.

He was educated at the Instituto Tecnológico Autónomo de México, The Hague University of Applied Sciences and the University of East Anglia (PhD). He was affiliated with the Institutional Revolutionary Party, and played a role in coordinating Luis Donaldo Colossio's 1994 presidential campaign. After 2000, he launched Mexico Social, a magazine focused on Mexico's wealth inequality, whilst no longer keeping his ties to the party.
