= Daniel Karam Toumeh =

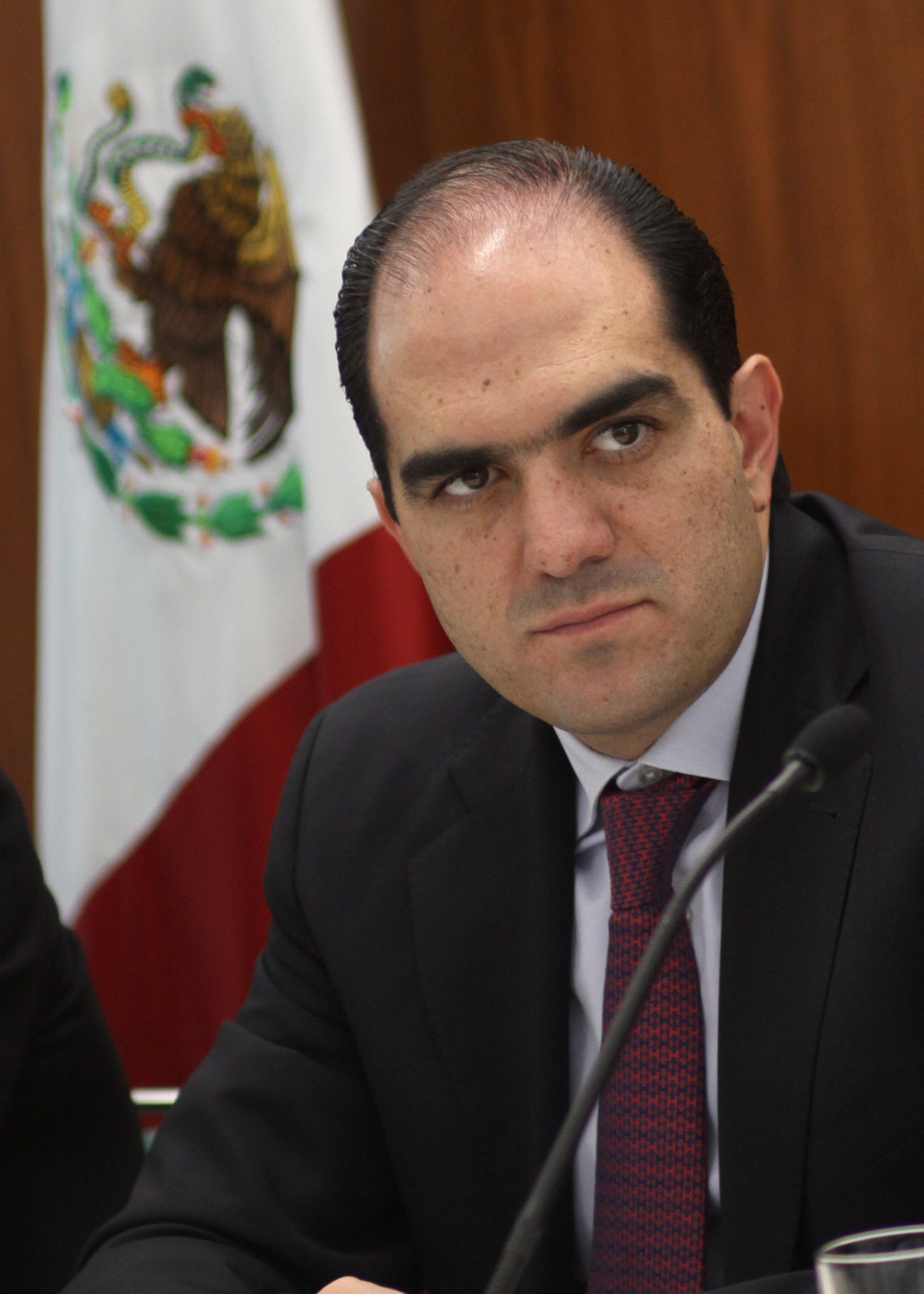
Daniel Karam Toumeh

Daniel Karam Toumeh (born March 15, 1973, in Mexico City) has a BA in Economics from ITAM and holds a master's degree in Public Administration from the John F. Kennedy School of Government at Harvard University. Currently he is the CEO of Hill+Knowlton Strategies Mexico.

== Career ==
In 1996, he began his career in the public sector as Private Secretary and Advisor to the General Director of Treasury Planning at the Ministry of Finance and Public Credit (SHCP).

In 2000, he began serving in the private sector as an Associate Consultant at ADP/Mercer Management Consulting and later, in 2001, as Vice President of the global PR firm Hill+Knowlton Mexico where he contributed to design and implement various communication and promotion programs for corporations and products of the pharmaceutical, financial and telecommunications industry; he also had a relationship with the media and investors for whom he designed and implemented lobbying campaigns .

In 2002, Karam rejoined the public service as Coordinator of Advisors of the Incorporation and Collection Office at the Mexican Social Security Institute (IMSS), and in 2004 served as Coordinator of Taxation of the IMSS .

During the Mexican presidential campaigns in 2006, Karam participated as an advisor on proposals and speech for the PAN's candidate and eventual president Felipe Calderón Hinojosa. Later, he was responsible for the health and social security projects in the transition team of the President-elect .

Once the Calderon's Administration began, he was appointed as CFO of the Mexican Social Security Institute. Subsequently, he served as the National Commissioner of Social Protection in Health .

In March 2009, President Felipe Calderón Hinojosa appointed him as Managing Director of the IMSS in replacement of Juan Francisco Molinar Horcasitas .

In 2015, Hill+Knowlton Strategies named Karam President and Managing Director of H+K Mexico, as well as Latin America Public Affairs Practice Lead, as part of a strategic movement to identify key sectors in development .

== Influenza ==
In April 2015, as head of the IMSS, he had to face the outbreak of influenza, the H1N1 virus that for several days paralyzed the country's economy. Together with President Calderón and the head of the Ministry of Health, he took measures to prevent the spread of this virus, such as the cancellation of classes, mass events and the closure of restaurants.

All this experience allowed him to participate in May 2015 as coauthor of the book The Mexican influenza and the pandemic that is coming next to José Luis Romo, Juan Lozano, Mauricio Ortiz, Roberto Albiztegui and Santiago Echevarría Zuno, published by Siglo XXI, in which he describes his experience at the head of the IMSS during the emergence of the virus, the management of the information, the coordination of health services and the decision-making for their combat.

== The ABC day care case ==
On June 5, 2009, the ABC day-care center in Hermosillo , Sonora caught fire, causing the death of 49 children. The tragic event prompted the parents of the victims to demand from the IMSS the clarification of the facts as it is a child care center subrogated by the Institute.

As head of the IMSS, Daniel Karam was in charge of leading the dialogue roundtables and following up the investigation. In early 2010, he was blame by members of the Supreme Court of Justice of the Nation as a possible responsible for the fire at the ABC day-care center and although he was exonerated, three judges of the Supreme Court considered that his conduct in the case was incorrect.

Karam was summoned to several appearances in the Mexico's Congress to clarify the responsibility of those involved and the name of the owners of the day-care center concerned.

Upon his departure from the IMSS, Daniel Karam assured that he left an orderly Institute, walking and with well-diagnosed challenges.
