= Rubén Velázquez López =

Mexican politician

Senator of the Congress of the Union for Chiapas
- In office 1 September 2006 – 31 August 2012
- Preceded by: Rutilio Escandón
- Succeeded by: Zoé Robledo Aburto

Personal details
- Born: 4 February 1953 (age 73) Tuxtla Gutiérrez, Chiapas, Mexico
- Party: PRD
- Occupation: Senator

Rubén Fernando Velázquez López (born 4 February 1953) is a Mexican politician affiliated with the PRD. As of 2013 he served as Senator of the LX and LXI Legislatures of the Mexican Congress representing Chiapas.
