= Mexican Social Security Institute =

Mexican social welfare institution

Mexican Institute of Social Security
- IMSS Logo

Agency overview
- Formed: January 19, 1943
- Jurisdiction: Federal government of Mexico
- Headquarters: Reforma 476, Col. Juárez, México City
- Employees: 360,106 (2007)
- Annual budget: MXN$335 billion (2021)
- Agency executive: Zoé Robledo Aburto, General Director
- Parent agency: Secretariat of Health
- Website: www.imss.gob.mx

The Mexican Institute of Social Security (Spanish: Instituto Mexicano del Seguro Social, IMSS) is a governmental organization that assists public health, pensions and social security in Mexico operating under the Secretariat of Health. It also forms an integral part of the Mexican healthcare system.

== History ==
The IMSS was founded by Mexican President Manuel Ávila Camacho on January 19, 1943 to satisfy the legal precepts established in the Article 123 of the Mexican Constitution. It is constituted by representations of the workers, employers, and the federal government.

It is the largest social welfare institution in all Latin America.

For some time, however, there have been festering signs of trouble in IMSS, such as serious financial problems that came to a head in early November 2010.

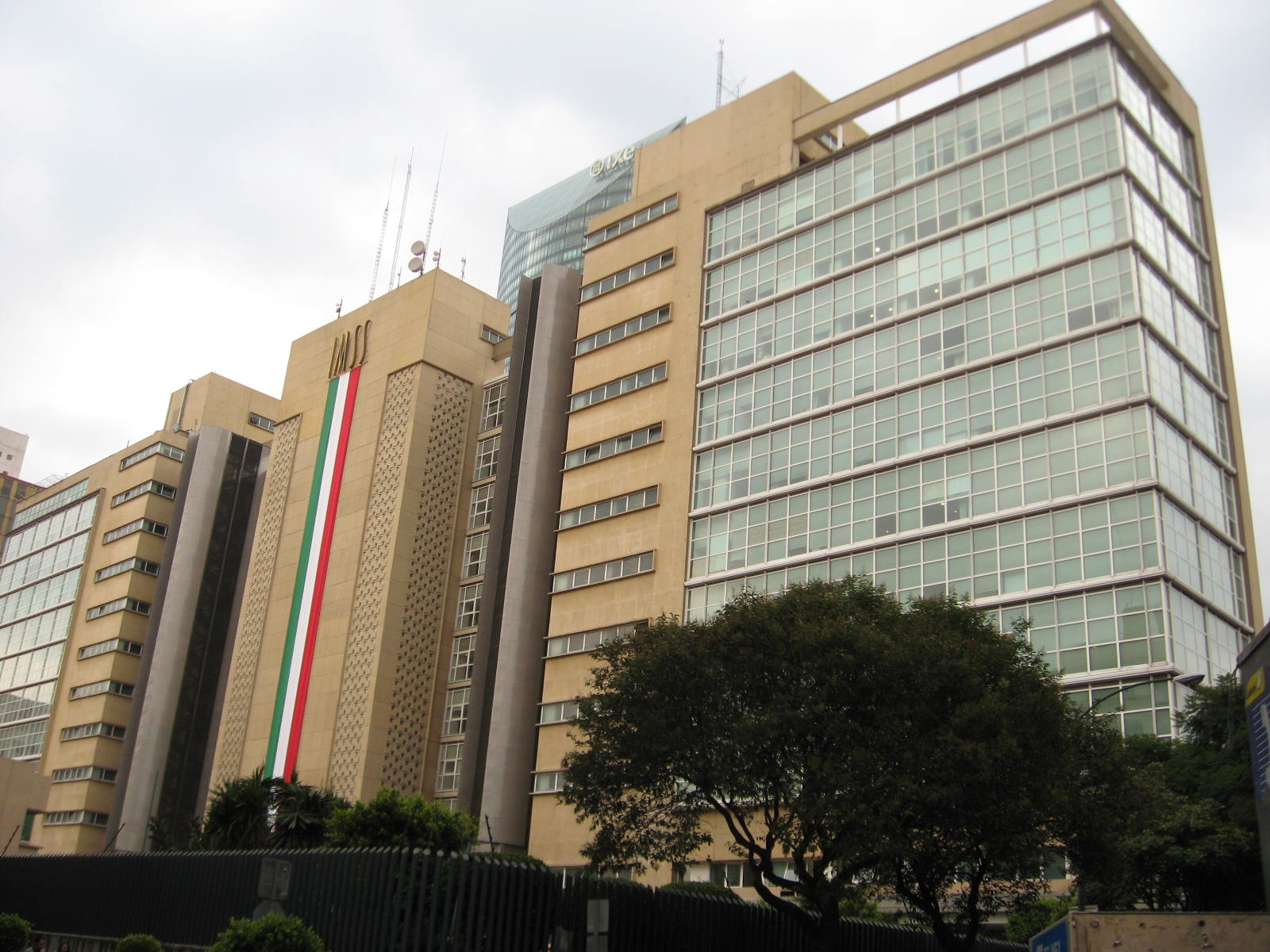
Mexican Social Security Institute building (IMSS), located on Street Near Metro station Sevilla in Mexico City.

== Directors-General ==
officeholder	term in office
Vicente Santos Guajardo	1940–1944
Ignacio García Téllez	1944–1946
Antonio Díaz Lombardo	1946–1952
Antonio Ortiz Mena	1952–1958
Benito Coquet Lagunes	1958–1964
Sealtiel Alatriste Ábrego	1964–1966
Ignacio Morones Prieto	1966–1970
Carlos Gálvez Betancourt	1970–1975
Jesús Reyes Heroles	1975–1976
Arsenio Farell Cubillas	1976–1982
Ricardo García Sainz	1982–1991
Emilio Gamboa Patrón	1991–1993
Genaro Borrego Estrada	1993–2000
Mario Luis Fuentes Alcalá	2000
Santiago Levy Algazi	2000–2005
Fernando Flores y Pérez	2005–2006
Juan Francisco Molinar Horcasitas	2006–2009
Daniel Karam Toumeh	2009–2012
José Antonio González Anaya	2012–2016
Mikel Andoni Arriola Peñalosa	2016–2017
Tufic Miguel Ortega	2017–2018
Germán Martínez Cázares	2018–2019
Zoé Robledo Aburto	2019–

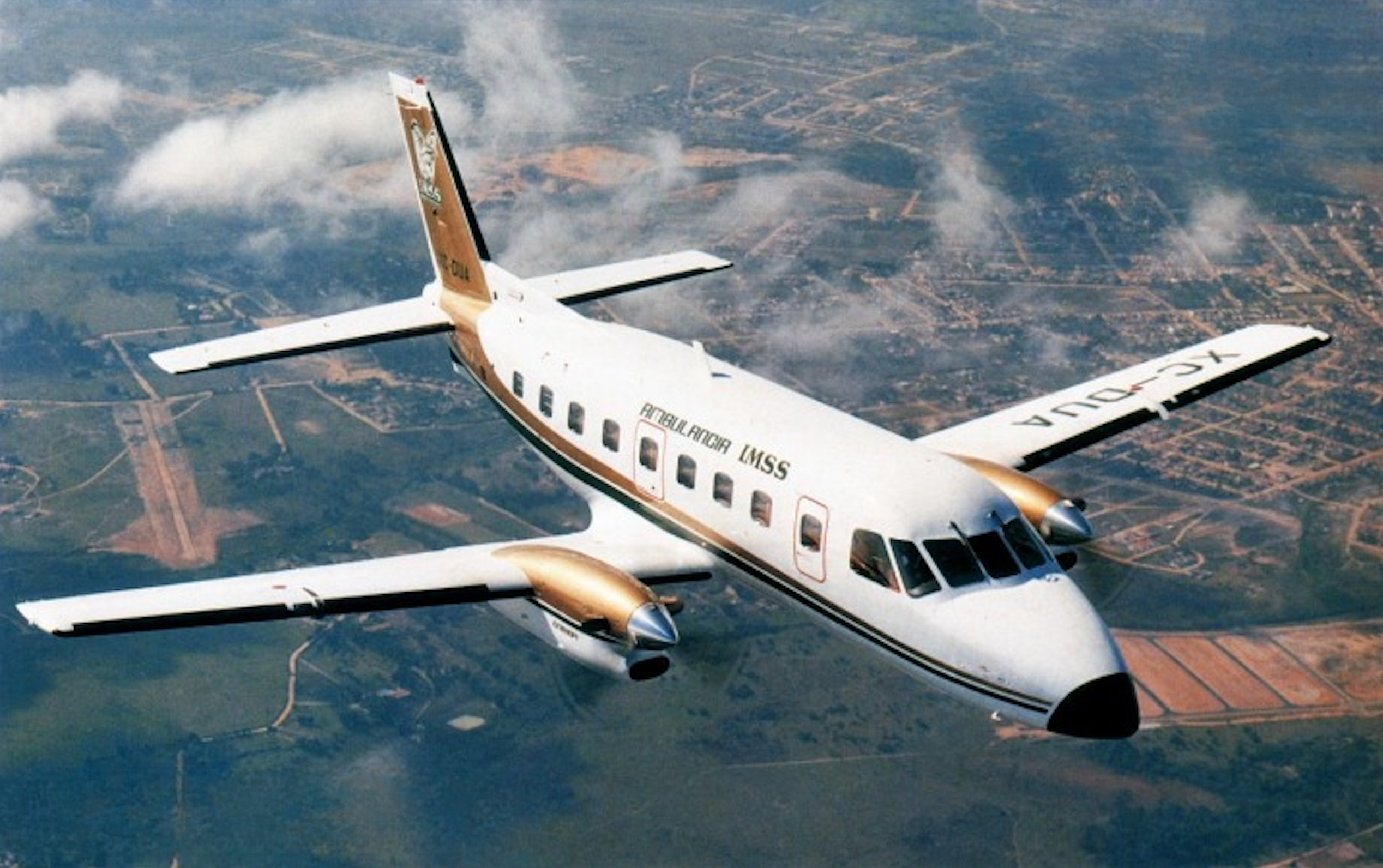
Model air ambulance service on regular routes and schedules used in the transport of patients for treatment, from rural areas to national central hospitals, operated from 1979 to 1982. The service transported 100,000 patients in its first 18 months of operation.

== Mexican Social Security Law ==
The Mexican Social Security law currently in effect, published in the Official Journal of the Federation (21 December 1995), is the legislative domain under which the IMSS carries out its operations.

Currently the law indicates that Social Security has the following purposes:

- Medical assistance
- Protection of basic necessities of subsistence
- Social services necessary for individual and collective well-being
- Giving out a pension which, depending on the completion of the legal prerequisites, will be guaranteed by the State

The law contemplates two domains, an "obligatory" one (funded by individual, employer and state contributions), and a "voluntary" one (aimed at workers in household industries and self-employed professionals).

The following items are excluded from the base quoted salary:

- Tools of trade such as tools and clothing
- Savings deposits, when they are made up of a weekly, biweekly or monthly deposit equally from the worker and the employer
- Additional voluntary contributions
- Contributions to INFONAVIT
- Food and lodging when they are given in an onerous manner
- Payments in coin or cash
- Rewards for attendance and punctuality
- Overtime, within limits established by law
