= Healthcare in Mexico =

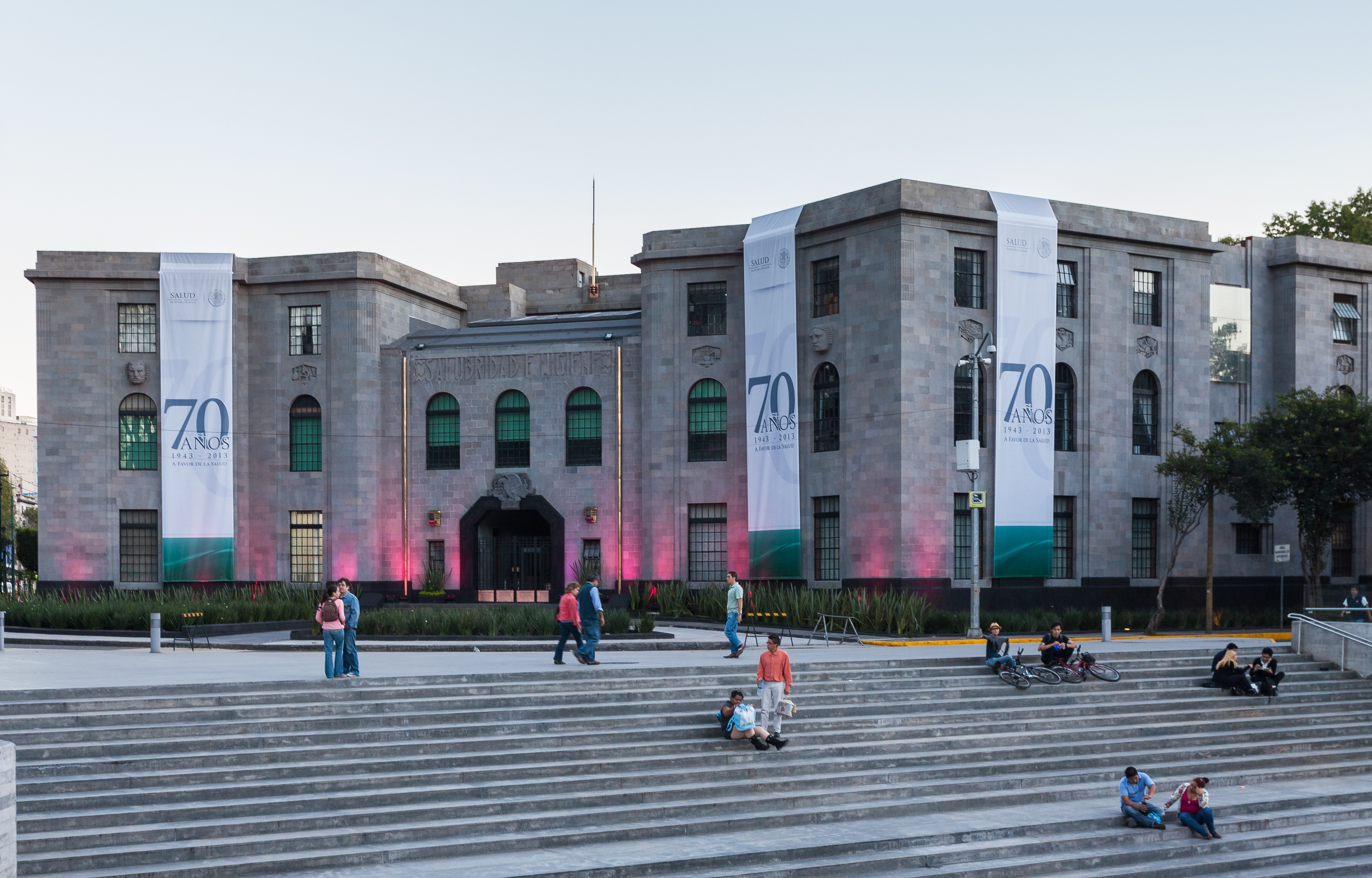
Secretary of Health, Mexico City, Mexico.

Healthcare in Mexico is a multifaceted system comprising public institutions overseen by government departments, private hospitals and clinics, and private physicians. It is distinguished by a unique amalgamation of coverage predominantly contingent upon individuals' employment statuses. Rooted in the Mexican constitution's principles, every Mexican citizen is entitled to cost-free access to healthcare and medication. This constitutional mandate was translated into reality through the auspices of the Instituto de Salud para el Bienestar (English: Institute of Health for Well-being), abbreviated as INSABI; however, INSABI was discontinued in 2023.

The 1917 Mexican Federal Constitution delineates the fundamental principles and structure of the Mexican government, including its obligations to its citizens in various sectors, notably health care. Within its provisions, the Constitution allocates primary responsibility to the state for ensuring the provision of national health services to the populace. The segmentation within the Mexican healthcare system has facilitated the emergence of private organizations and medical practices operated by physicians, thereby offering a diverse array of healthcare options to individuals with the means and inclination to procure such services.

In the realm of epidemiological research focused on Mexico's healthcare landscape, Jorge L. León-Cortés has conducted significant investigations into the historical backdrop of the nation, particularly spanning the years 2012 to 2018. León-Cortés' studies have illuminated a concerning trend characterized by a marked increase in the prevalence of communicable diseases and chronic conditions within the Mexican populace, exerting considerable impact on life expectancies and mortality rates during this period. The structural configuration of the Mexican health system is characterized by ongoing evolution and considerable heterogeneity, manifesting in diverse national health statistics and varying accessibility standards observed across the country.

== History ==
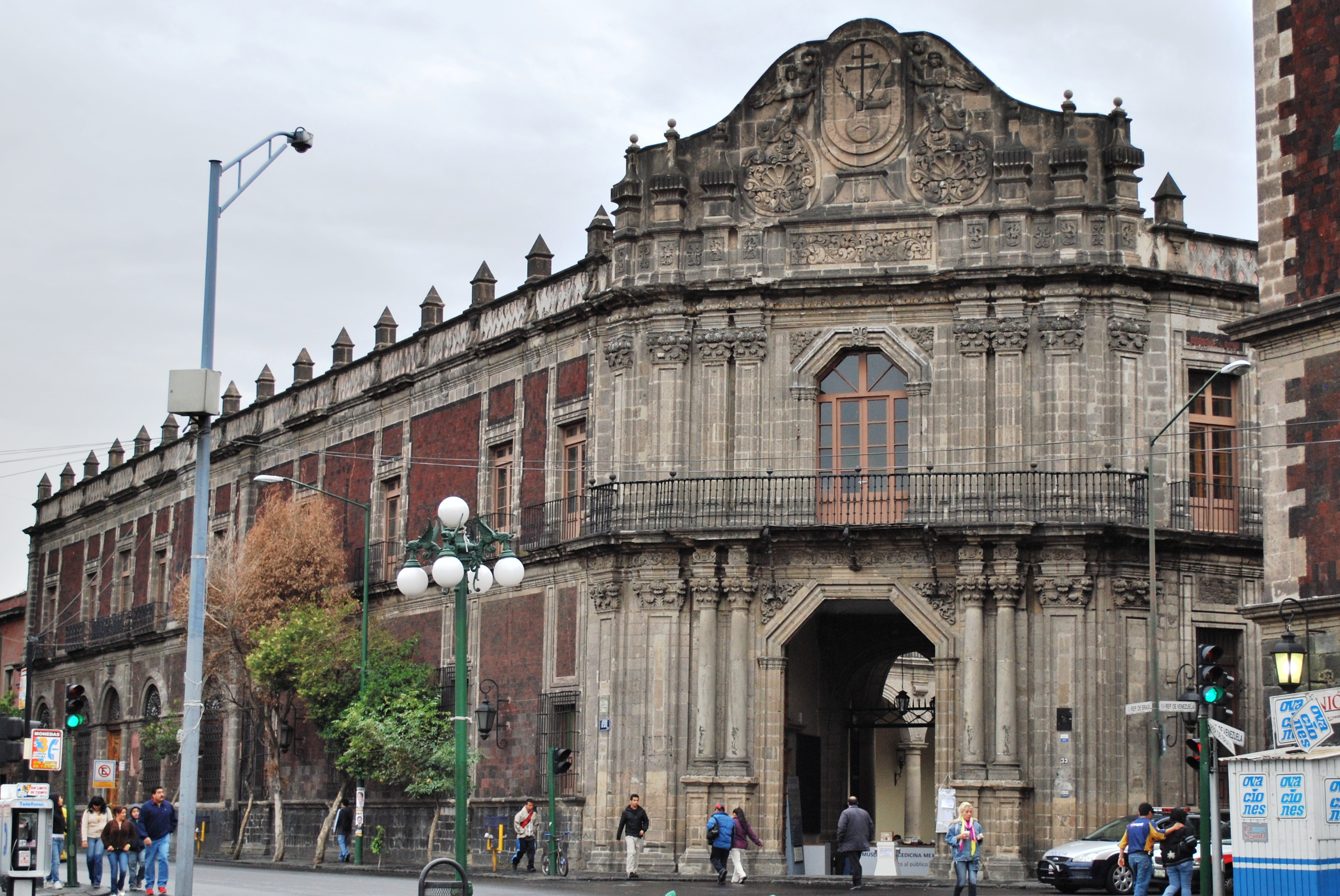
The Museum of Mexican Medicine

In Mexico, the sixteenth century Badianus Manuscript described medicinal plants available in Central America. Dr. Erick Estrada Lugo, Researcher-Professor in Phytotechnics at the State of Mexico's Chapingo Autonomous University, told the National Autonomous University of Mexico's digital magazine that "at least 90% of the population uses medicinal plants," citing figures from Mexico's Secretariat of Health. These include plants like Aloe vera, Arnica, and Valeriana.

Hospitals were established in Mexico in the early 16th century, including ones exclusively for Indians. Some were established by the crown, others by private endowment, but most by the Catholic Church. Bishop Vasco de Quiroga established hospital complexes in Michoacan in the sixteenth century. In Mexico City, conqueror Hernán Cortés established the Hospital de Jesús Nazareno for Indians, which still functions as a hospital.

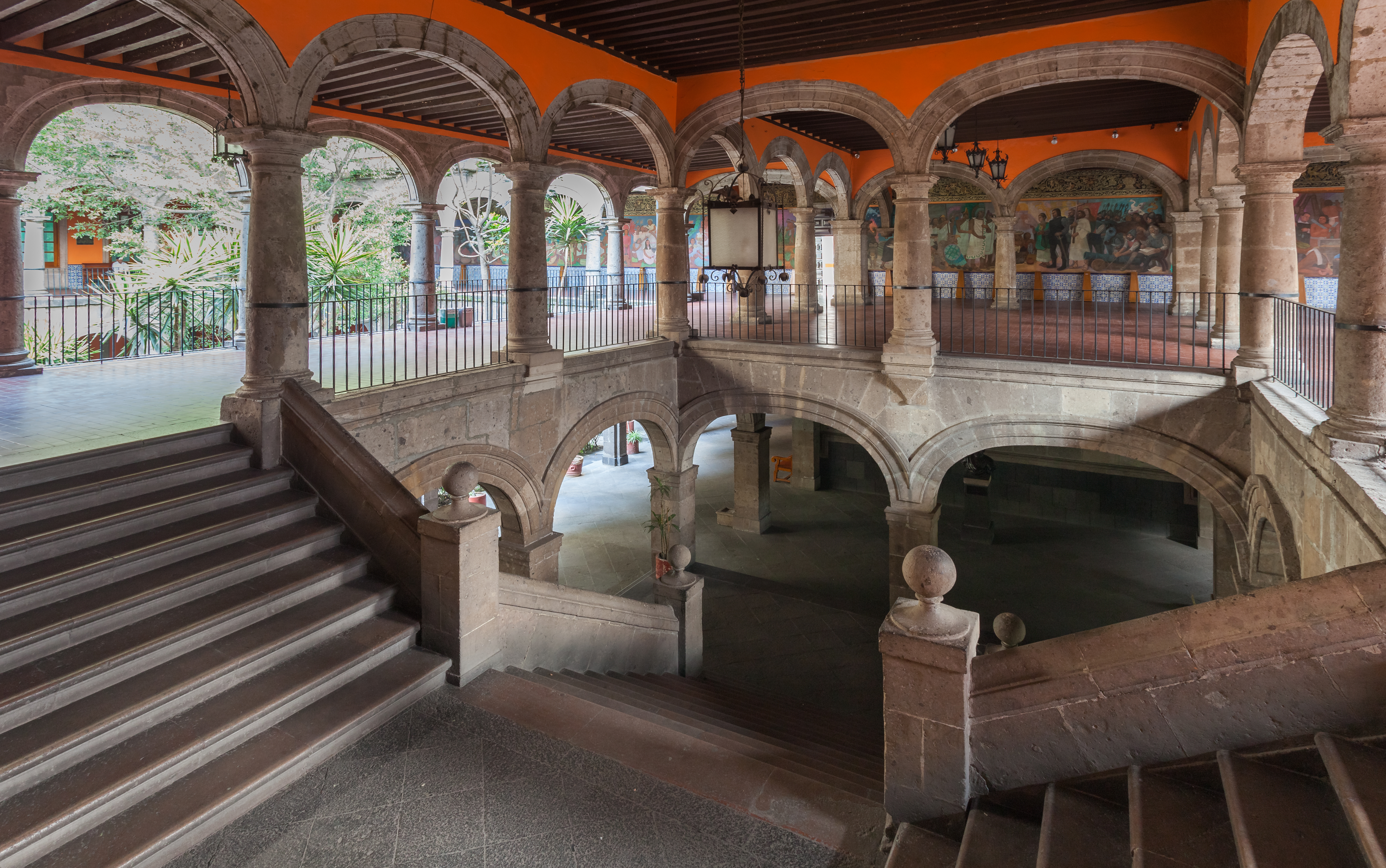
Hospital de Jesús Nazareno stairs and murals.

The Hospicio Cabañas in Guadalajara, Jalisco, Mexico, was founded in 1791. It is still functioning and is now a World Heritage Site. It is one of the oldest and largest hospital complexes in Latin America. The complex was founded by the Bishop of Guadalajara to combine the functions of a workhouse, hospital, orphanage, and almshouse.

The Mexican healthcare program, as we know it today, has its base on the creation of several health codes that ran during the first part of the 20th century. In 1943, the Mexican Secretariat of Health and Assistance was established to merge the Department of Public Sanitation and the Secretariat of Public Assistance. In that same year, the Mexican Social Security Institute and the Mexican Children's Hospital were founded, during the presidency of Manuel Avila Camacho.

After this, several and important changes came, aiming to provide better health for the population. In 1959, the Institute for Social Security and Services for State Workers (ISSSTE) was formed as a way of more effectively covering the health services of individuals employed in government institutions. The Seguro Popular, or Popular Health Insurance, was implemented countrywide in 2003 after the creation of the Social System during the presidency of Vicente Fox Quesada. In the world's largest randomized health policy experiment, Seguro Popular was evaluated at arm's length by a team at Harvard University, which concluded that "programme resources reached the poor," an unusual result for any country. In 2020, it was replaced by the Institute of Health for Welfare (INSABI), which was replaced in 2023 by the IMSS-Bienestar. Seguro Popular was closed in June 2020.

=== Public health ===
The logo of the Mexican Social Security Institute, a governmental agency dealing with public health

Public health issues were important for the Spanish Empire during the colonial era. Epidemic disease was the main factor in the decline of indigenous populations in the era immediately following the sixteenth-century conquest era and was a problem during the colonial era. The Spanish crown took steps in eighteenth-century Mexico to bring in regulations to make populations healthier. In the late nineteenth century, Mexico was in the process of modernization, and public health issues were again tackled from a scientific point of view. As in the U.S., food safety became a public health issue, particularly focusing on meat slaughterhouses and meatpacking.

Even during the Mexican Revolution (1910–20), public health was an important concern, with a text on hygiene published in 1916. During the Mexican Revolution, feminist and trained nurse Elena Arizmendi Mejia founded the Neutral White Cross, treating wounded soldiers no matter for what faction they fought. In the post-revolutionary period after 1920, improved public health was a revolutionary goal of the Mexican government. The Mexican state promoted the health of the Mexican population, with most resources going to cities.

Concern about disease conditions and social impediments to the improvement of Mexicans' health were important in the formation of the Mexican Society for Eugenics. The movement flourished from the 1920s to the 1940s. Mexico was not alone in Latin America or the world in promoting eugenics. Government campaigns against disease and alcoholism were also seen as promoting public health.

The Mexican Social Security Institute was established in 1943, during the administration of President Manuel Avila Camacho to deal with public health, pensions, and social security.

== Private healthcare delivery ==
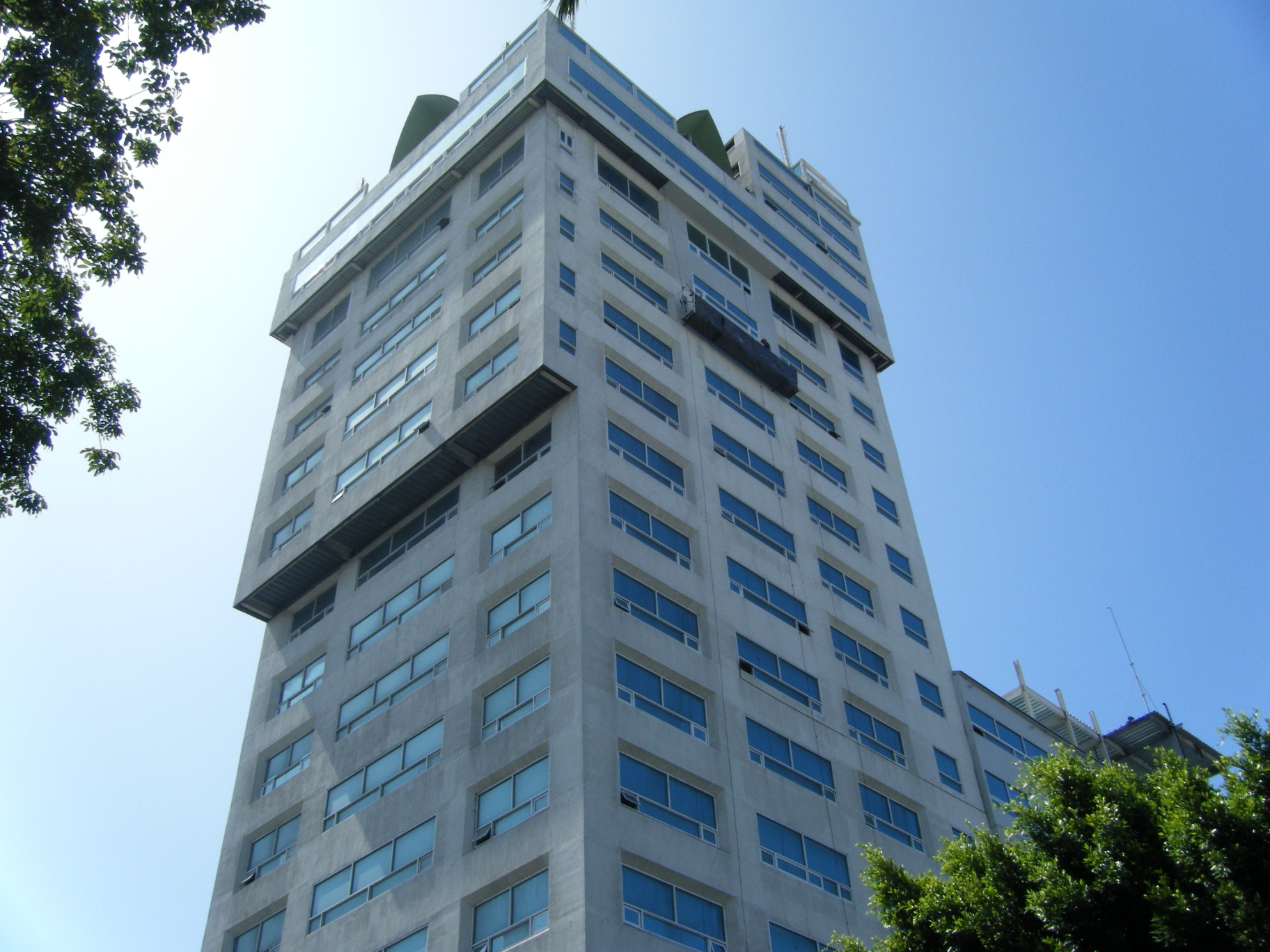
Centro Médico Excel, a multi specialty private hospital in Tijuana

The private healthcare sector makes up a substantial portion of the Mexican healthcare system with respect to both spending and activity. Recently, higher activity within the private sector of the Mexican healthcare system has been observed in comparison to its public counterpart. Overall spending being attributed to the private institutions accounts for approximately 52% of total health spending in the country. Furthermore, this proportion appears to be subject to a sustained increase in recent years.

The services provided by private institutions and private physicians in their offices are afforded by a part of the population, either by contracting a private insurance or by paying directly for the services obtained. It is estimated that around 6.9% of the Mexican population has private insurance coverage, mainly paid as an out-of-pocket expenditure. Generally, utilization of this sector of the healthcare system is limited to Mexicans of higher socioeconomic status.

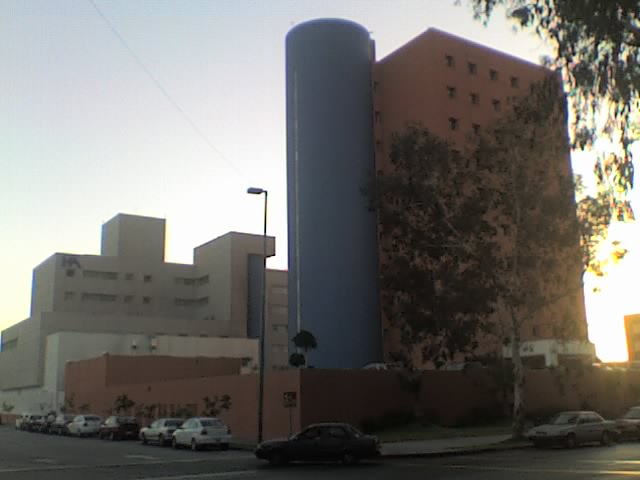
Hospital Angeles Tijuana serves as the primary hospital of Tijuana.

To meet the needs of the population, relationships between the private and public healthcare sectors are beginning to form in various capacities. Recently however, studies have shown little coordination between this system and the other public sector institutions. The high fragmentation of the system has been observed to affect spending trends as well as the services received from beneficiaries.

Private healthcare delivery is a heterogenous institution, with varying levels of regulation, quality, and government association being observed within the institutions which compose it. In 2005, Mexico had around 28.6 private facilities per 1 million inhabitants, which accounted for two thirds of all hospitals in Mexico, with 2,988 institutions.

The increased use of the private healthcare sector may be attributed to the association of public forms of healthcare with restriction in accessibility and quality. The belief that these services are superior in quality appears to widespread—many patients depend heavily upon these forms of healthcare, even though public services are at times provided at no cost. Private services tend to be associated with shorter wait times, less crowding, a stronger and more satisfying patient-provider interaction, and higher quality equipment and medications. The duration of a visits in a private hospitals tend to be more than double that of their public counterparts. The quality of services performed in these institutions, however, is of debate. Especially in the field of prenatal care, disparities in quality exist among private and public institutions.

In addition to members of the Mexican populace, some individuals with connections to Mexico—including citizens, undocumented immigrants residing in the U.S., and even permanent U.S. residents with Mexican ties—associate private Mexican institutions with convenience, affordability, and efficacy, even rating them above their American public counterparts. This has created a phenomenon, known as medical returns, in which select populations, such as migrants, preferentially return to Mexico in order to receive medical treatment.

Mexican providers, especially in the private sector, but also in its public counterpart, appear to be less restricted by the possibility of lawsuit in their practice, especially when compared to their equivalent American counterparts, which may contribute to a higher perceived standard of care.

=== Medical tourism ===
Mexico is a prominent destination for medical tourism, attracting thousands of international patients each year, primarily from the United States and Canada. The sector is driven by the availability of affordable procedures, proximity to the U.S., and a growing number of accredited hospitals and clinics in cities such as Tijuana, Guadalajara, and Cancún. Common treatments include dental procedures, cosmetic surgery, bariatric surgery, and orthopedic care. Many private healthcare facilities offer English-speaking staff, international accreditations, and packages specifically designed for foreign patients. Roughly 600 dentists practice in the community, catering mainly to tourists, leading the community to be nicknamed "Molar City".

== Public healthcare delivery ==
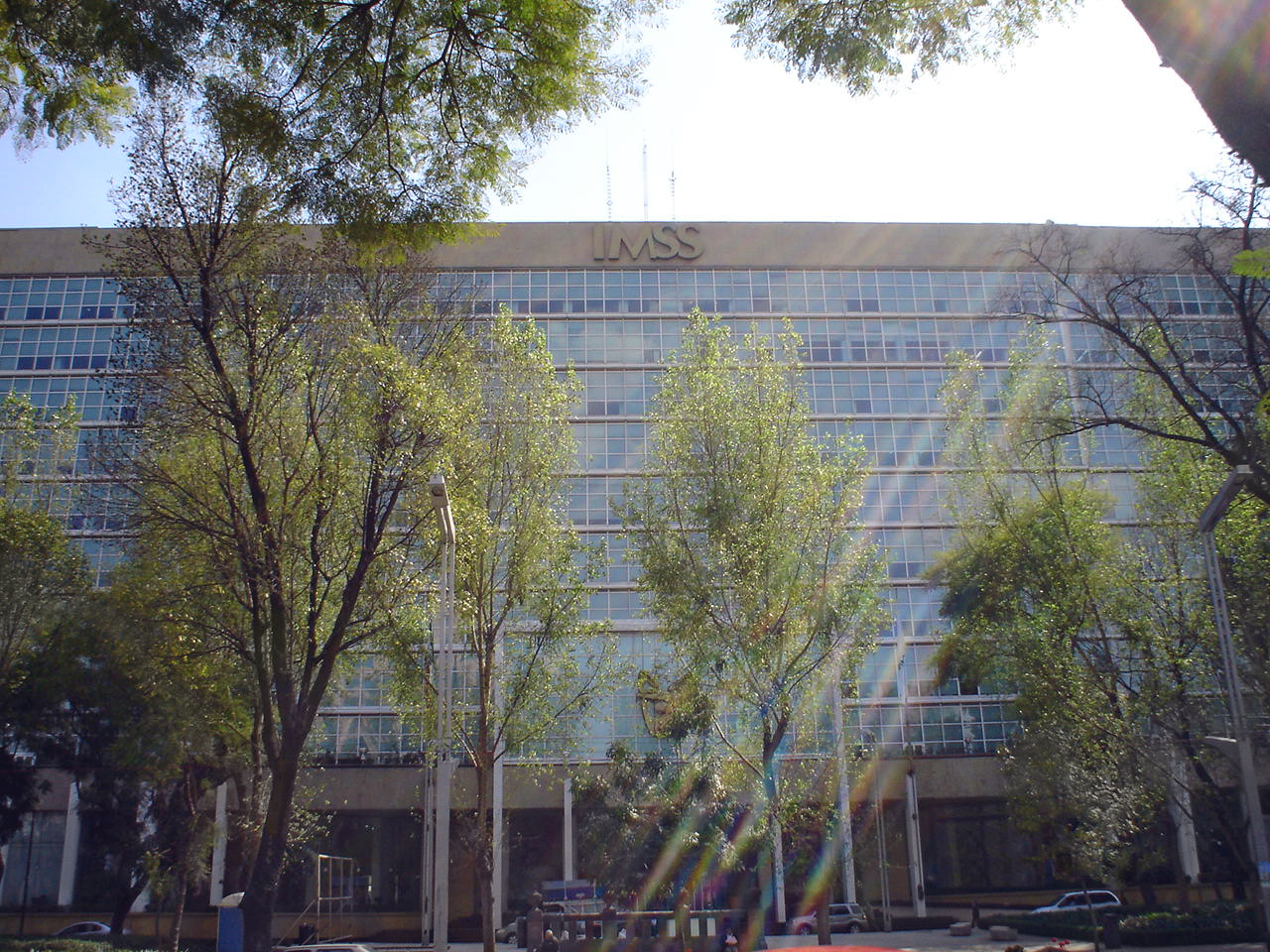
Central Offices of IMSS in Mexico city.

Public healthcare has an elaborate provisioning and delivery system instituted by the Mexican government. It is provided to all Mexican citizens, as guaranteed by Article 4 of the Constitution.

Public care is fully or partially subsidized by the federal government, depending upon the person's employment status. All Mexican citizens are eligible for subsidized healthcare regardless of their work status via a system of health care facilities operating under the federal Secretariat of Health (formerly the Secretaría de Salubridad y Asistencia, or SSA) agency through the program called INSABI which offers coverage to Mexicans who do not have formal employment.

In 2016, the program protected over 57 million inhabitants and covers all conditions, services and medicine free of charge. This public insurance scheme, coupled with Social Security, represents 95% of the insured population in Mexico. Funding for INSABI is derived from the federal government, the Secretariat of Health, and the individuals who form a part of this system. Approximately 20% of individuals in this system, representing the poorest covered sector, are exempt from this.

Employed citizens and their dependents can use the program administered and operated by the Instituto Mexicano del Seguro Social (IMSS) (English: Mexican Social Security Institute). The IMSS program is a tripartite system funded equally by the employee, the private employer, and the federal government. There are more than 65 million people covered through IMSS and its programs. Within IMSS is the IMSS-Opportunidades, a program established out of the Program to Combat Poverty, which is specifically targeted towards aiding the poorest individuals in Mexico in both the health and educational fields. This program is completely funded by the government.

The IMSS does not provide service to public employees, who instead are serviced by the Instituto de Seguridad y Servicios Sociales de los Trabajadores del Estado (ISSSTE) (English: Institute for Social Security and Services for State Workers), which attends to the health and social care needs of government employees at the local, state, and federal levels. Nearly 9 million people are covered by the ISSSTE.

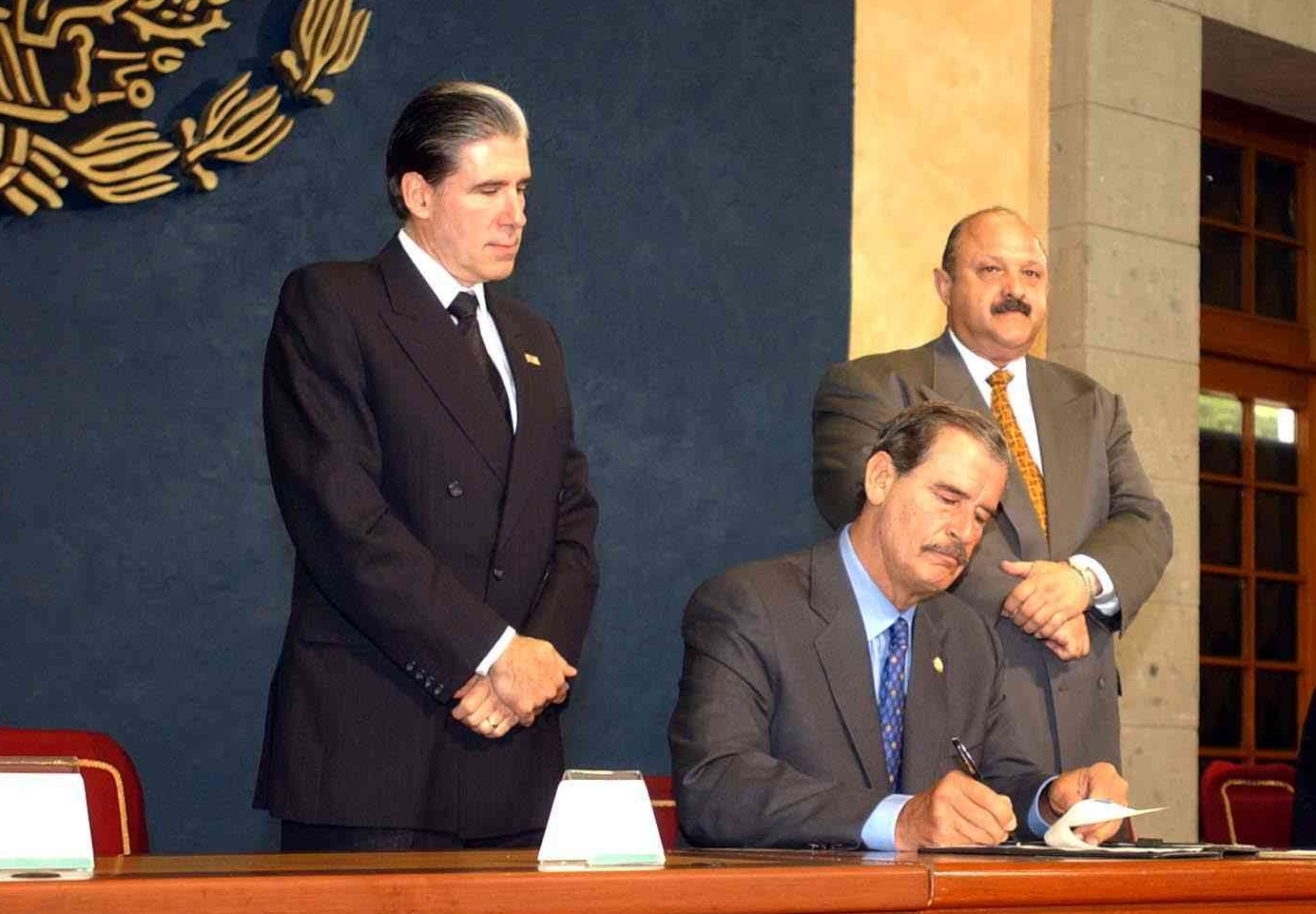
Secretary of Health of Mexico Julio Frenk with former President Vicente Fox and Reyes Tamez, Secretary of Education, in Los Pinos during the initialing ceremony of the National Institute of Genomic Medicine.

The state governments of Mexico provide health services independently of those that are provided by the federal government programs. In most states, the state government has established free or subsidized healthcare to all of its citizens.

The Secretariat of Health is the largest public healthcare institution, operating 809 hospitals throughout Mexico. The IMSS grants hospital care and services to employed citizens and their dependents and had 279 hospitals affiliated to it. The ISSSTE grants hospital care and services to government employees and has 115 affiliated hospitals. The other 279 hospitals are affiliated with 9 government dependencies, including State Facilities, Secretariat of National Defense (Secretaria de Defensa Nacional), Mexican Navy (Secretaria de Marina), Petroleos Mexicanos (PEMEX), and the Red Cross (Cruz Roja). The health systems associated with SEDENA, SEMAR, and PEMEX cover over one million individuals combined.

In 2007, there were a total of 23,858 health units within the Mexican state. Approximately 27% of these were contained in the public sector.

== Health reform and coverage ==
León-Cortés, Fernández, and Sánchez-Pérez noted that before the health reform plan of 2012–2018, the E. Peña Nieto's administration took action to help the Mexican population, which was facing a large health crisis. Sustainability of life was at an all-time low and impacted many. The Administration had high hopes that the health reform plan would offer better healthcare for the lower income population of Mexico with the idea of providing better healthcare deals when it came to health issues.

The population of Mexican families in poverty struggled with healthcare benefits due to their labor status. At the end of 2018, the Sistema de Protección Social en Salud (SPSS – Social Health Protection System) gave most of the lower income families of Mexico access to better benefits.

The reforms included investment into advancing medical technology and better resources for the healthcare facility members.

== Health statistics ==
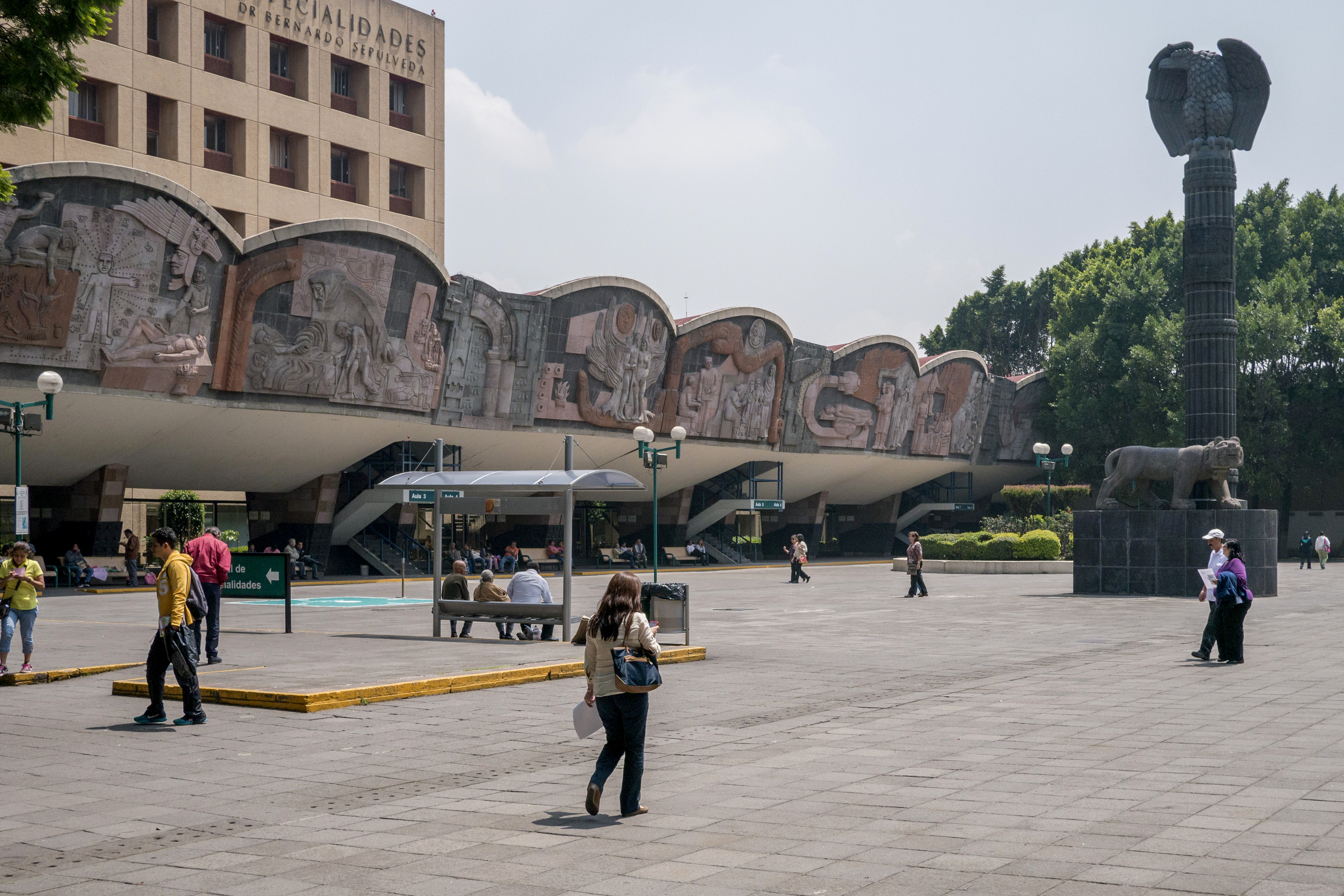
The General Hospital of Mexico, Mexico City.

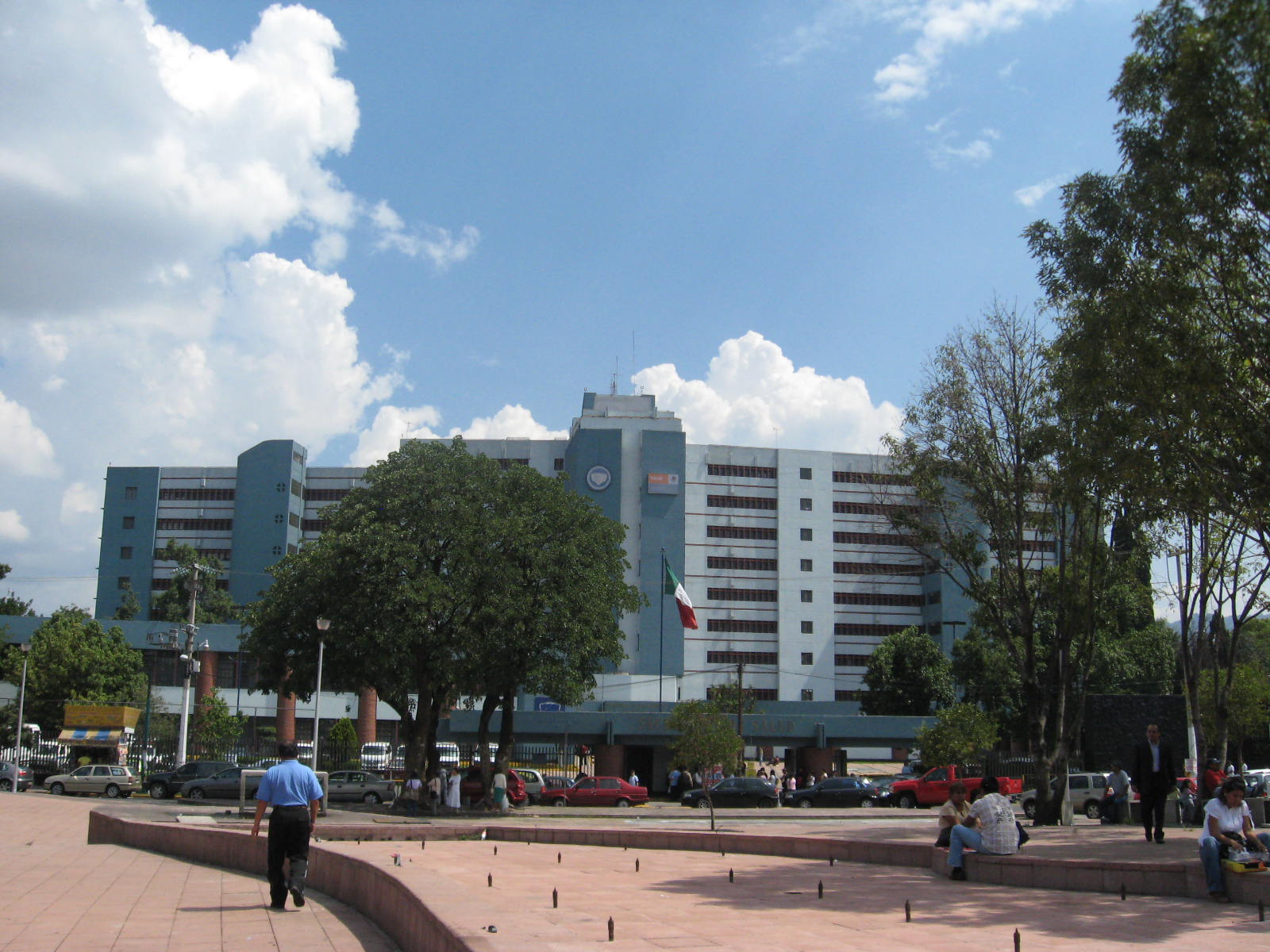
Fray Bernardino Alvarez Psychiatric Hospital located in the Tlalpan Borough, in Mexico City

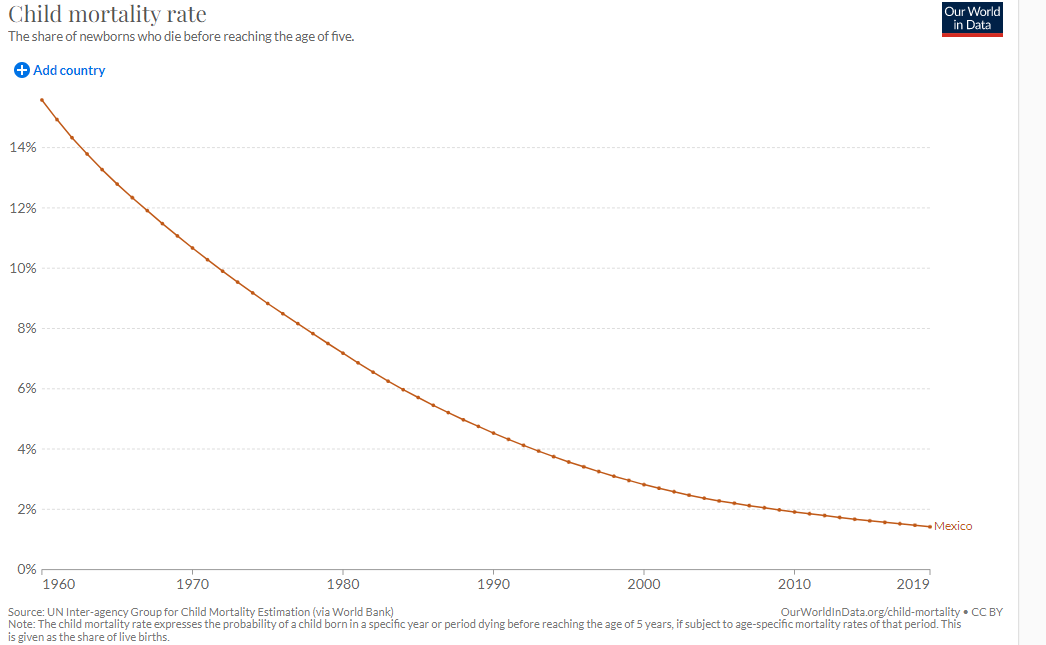
Child mortality in Mexico since 1960

Life expectancy in Mexico, 1893 to 2021

Mexico has seen an overall improvement in almost every aspect of health trend. However, Mexico lags well behind other Organisation for Economic Co-operation and Development countries in health status and availability.

Healthcare statistics, reported by the PAHO
| | 2016 |
|---|---|
| Life expectancy at birth (years) | 77.5* |
| Life expectancy at birth, male (years) | 75.1* |
| Life expectancy at birth, female (years) | 79.9* |
| Maternal mortality ratio (reported, per 100,000) | 36.7 |
| Mortality rate from communicable diseases (age-adjusted per 100,000) | 52.1 |
| Mortality rate from non-communicable diseases (age-adjusted per 100,000) | 469.6 |
| Mortality rate from external causes (age-adjusted rates per 100,000) | 56.6 |
| Mortality from breast cancer, female (age-adjusted rates per 100,000) | 11.2 |
| Mortality from lung cancer (age-adjusted rates per 100,000) | 6.4 |
| Mortality from ischemic heart diseases (age-adjusted rates per 100,000) | 83.2 |
| Mortality from cerebrovascular diseases (age-adjusted rates per 100,000) | 30.0 |
| Mortality from homicide (age-adjusted rates per 100,000) | 35.5 |
| Tobacco consumption among adults (age adjusted, %) | 14.2 |
| Alcohol consumption among adults (liters/per person/year) | 6.5 |
| Overweight and obesity, male (age-adjusted, %) | 63.6 |
| Overweight and obesity, female (age-adjusted, %) | 66.0 |
| Overweight and obesity in children aged < 5 years (%) | 5.2** |
| Hospital births (%) | 92.7 |
| Antenatal care coverage by skilled birth attendants of 4+ visits (%) | 89.5 |
| Number of physicians (per 10,000 population) | 24.0 |
| Number of nurses (per 10,000 population) | 29 |
| Number of dentists (per 10,000 population) | 1.9 |
*Data from 2018 **Data from 2012 Source: Pan American Health Organization

Top ten causes of death in Mexico in 2017, reported by IHME
| Cause | Deaths (per 100,000) | Percent |
|---|---|---|
| Cardiovascular diseases | 127.82 | 22.74% |
| Diabetes and kidney diseases | 102.15 | 18.18% |
| Neoplasms | 76.86 | 13.68% |
| Digestive diseases | 49.39 | 8.79% |
| Self-harm and interpersonal violence | 40.19 | 7.15% |
| Neurological diseases | 32.72 | 5.82% |
| Chronic respiratory diseases | 27.11 | 4.82% |
| Respiratory infections and Tuberculosis | 19.44 | 3.46% |
| Other non-communicable diseases | 17.32 | 3.08% |
| Unintentional injuries | 17.03 | 3.03% |
Source: Institute for Health Metrics and Evaluation

=== Health expenditure ===
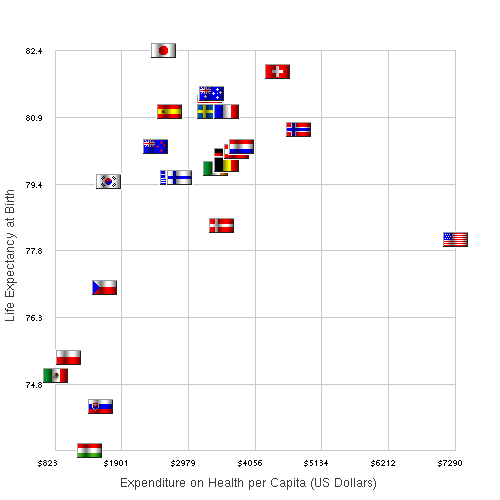
Comparison of healthcare spending and life expectancy for some countries in 2007

Total health expenditure represented around 5% of GDP in 1995, which went up to around 6.2% in 2012. In 2015 it declined to 5.6%. Historically, out-of-pocket expenditure has been a big portion of health expenditure, going from around 56% in 1995 to below 50% since 2008, with the most recent data being 40.6% in 2015.

In 2006, the establishment of new special funding programs, as well as more progressive limits on patient contribution was included. Funding was restructured in a manner that both promoted coverage through incentives directed towards state-level governments and reassessment of funding on a need-level basis.

=== Health demographics ===
In 2017, Mexico had an estimated population of 130 million, with an annual population growth rate of 1.2%. Since 1990, there was an increment of about 45 million people.

Demographic transition have been notorious in the last 7 decades in Mexico. Life expectancy at birth (general) changed from being 45 years in 1950 to 71.5 years in 1990, and to actually reach 77.5 years, close to some high-income countries in America and the World. Child mortality rate, as one of the major health trends, have improved most notoriously after 1950, when an average of 252 children under-five years were dead per 1,000 live births, decreasing to 44.5 in 1990 and reaching 14.6, in 2018.

After 1970, at least 20 years after the major changes in life expectancy and child mortality rate, there was a decrease in fertility rate. In 1950 it was estimated that for every woman, around 6.67 babies were born. In 1970, it increased to 6.8 and then, steadily decreased to 3.4 in 1990 to end in 2.1, which is below the world average.

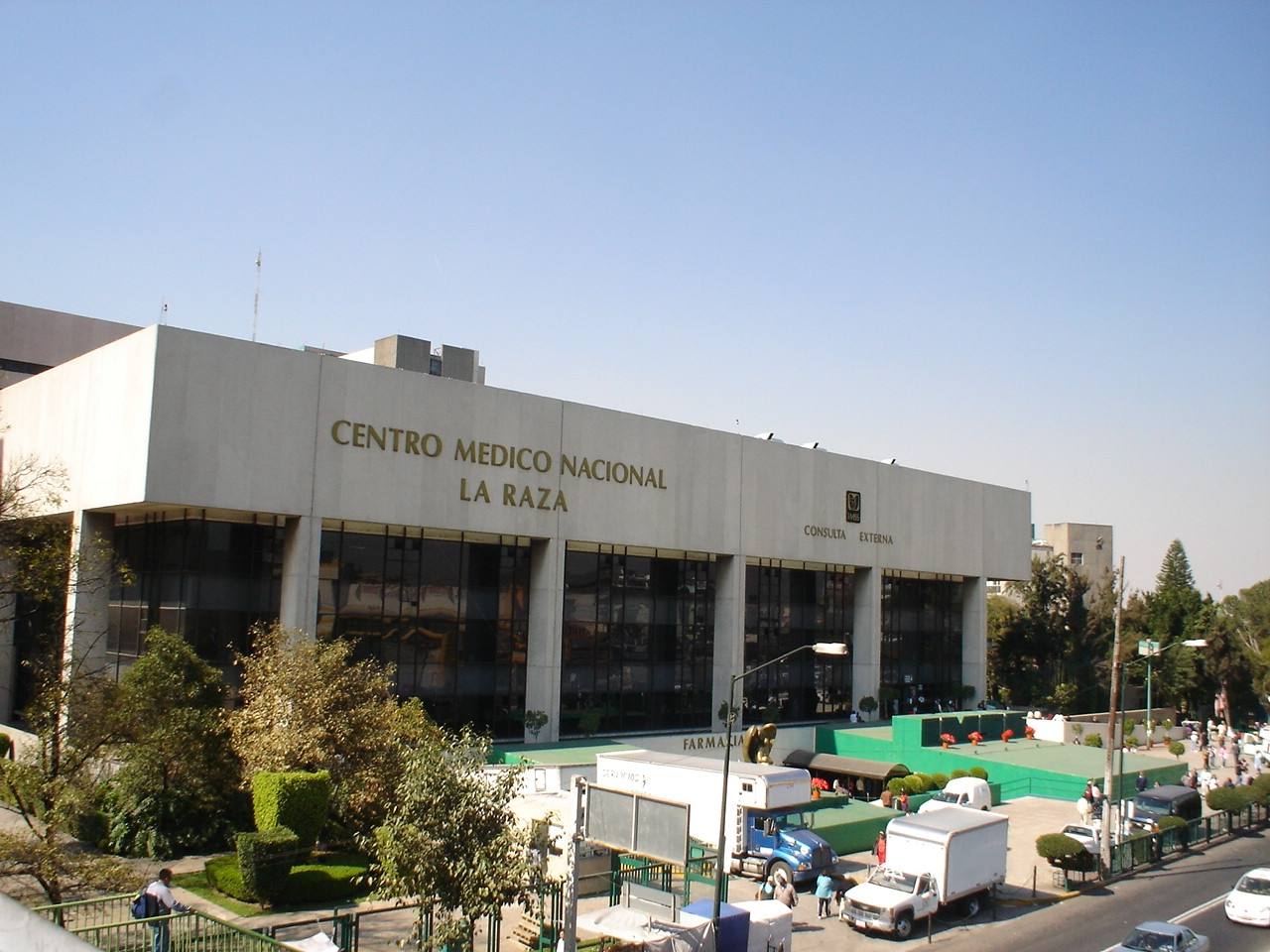
The IMSS La Raza Medical Center, a well known public hospital in Mexico City

Besides this demographic transition, there have been major changes in the principal causes of death and morbidities among Mexicans. Epidemiological transition has been notorious in the history of Mexico when it comes to Disability-adjusted life year (DALY) but not when comparing causes of death, with most data coming since 1990. In 1990, the leading causes of death in Mexico were also cardiovascular diseases, neoplasms and diabetes, which remain the same until recent data. Some infectious diseases (respiratory infections, tuberculosis and enteric infections) were also among the most common causes in the 90's, which were displaced for other non-communicable diseases in 2017.

Taking into consideration the burden of disease according to the years lost due to disability (DALY), in 1990, the three most common causes of disability were communicable and maternal diseases (maternal and neonatal disorders, respiratory infections, tuberculosis and enteric infections). In 2017, these 3 diseases were replaced by diabetes and kidney diseases, cardiovascular diseases and self-injuries, displacing most of the communicable diseases out of the top ten.

=== Current health issues ===
==== Diabetes ====
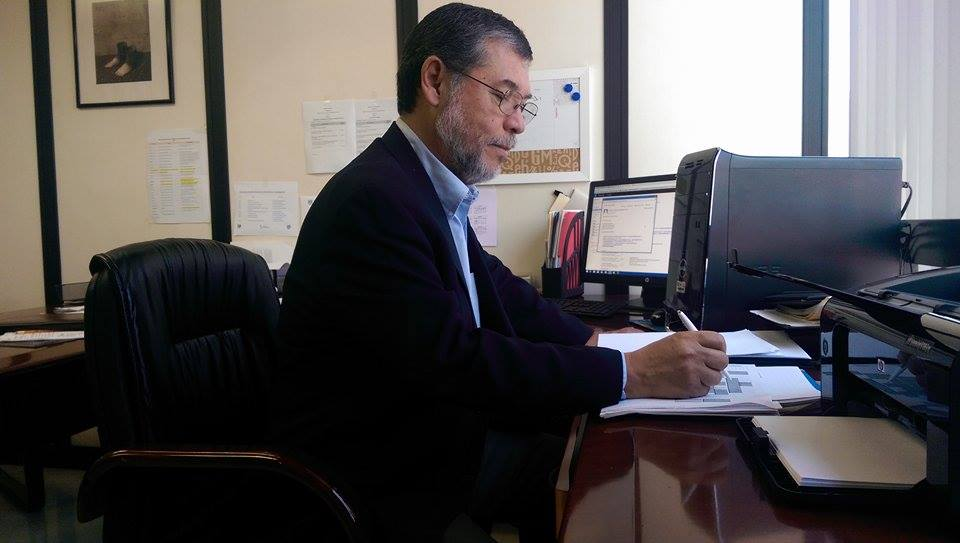
Dr. Samuel Ponce de León, a distinguished nephrologist and researcher, has made significant contributions to the understanding and treatment of kidney diseases in Mexico. His advocacy for improved access to renal care for underserved populations highlights his role in promoting health equity and patient-centered medicine.

Diabetes mellitus, particularly type 2, is one of the most serious public health challenges in Mexico. Between 1993 and 2006, the proportion of the population diagnosed with diabetes increased nearly fourfold, ultimately affecting close to a quarter of Mexican adults. During the same period, diabetes-related mortality rose more than twentyfold, and future projections indicate that the trend is likely to continue. As of recent estimates, approximately 14–15% of Mexican adults live with the disease, making it one of Mexico's leading causes of death and disability.

The rise in prevalence is attributed to various risk factors, including high rates of obesity, poor dietary habits, sedentary lifestyles, and genetic predisposition. Mexico's urbanization and the widespread consumption of sugary beverages and processed foods have significantly contributed to the problem. Mexico's healthcare system, particularly its public institutions such as the Instituto Mexicano del Seguro Social (IMSS) and Instituto de Seguridad y Servicios Sociales de los Trabajadores del Estado (ISSSTE), provides care to over 90% of diagnosed individuals, while only about 10% access private healthcare services. The financial burden of diabetes has led to notable health disparities, particularly affecting low-income and Indigenous populations.

In response to the epidemic, several leading medical institutions in Mexico provide specialized care. Public hospitals such as the Instituto Nacional de Ciencias Médicas y Nutrición Salvador Zubirán, Centro Médico Nacional Siglo XXI, and Centro Medico Nacional La Raza are recognized for their expertise in treating metabolic diseases and diabetes-related complications. In the private sector, facilities such as Médica Sur, Angeles Hospital Lomas, and Christus Muguerza Hospital Alta Especialidad offer multidisciplinary care.

Affordable care models like Clínicas del Azúcar (Sugar Clinics) aim to provide accessible, long-term diabetes management to underserved communities. Policy measures have also been implemented to address the disease's root causes. In 2014, Mexico introduced a tax on sugar-sweetened beverages as part of a national strategy to reduce obesity and related non-communicable diseases.

Other public health efforts include promoting physical activity, improving nutrition education, and expanding early detection programs. Recent innovations such as telemedicine and mobile health applications are being developed to enhance access to care in remote or marginalized areas. Despite these initiatives, the burden of diabetes in Mexico remains high. Experts emphasize the need for continued healthcare investment, system-wide reforms, and comprehensive strategies that address both the medical and socioeconomic dimensions of the disease.

==== Growing mental health crisis ====
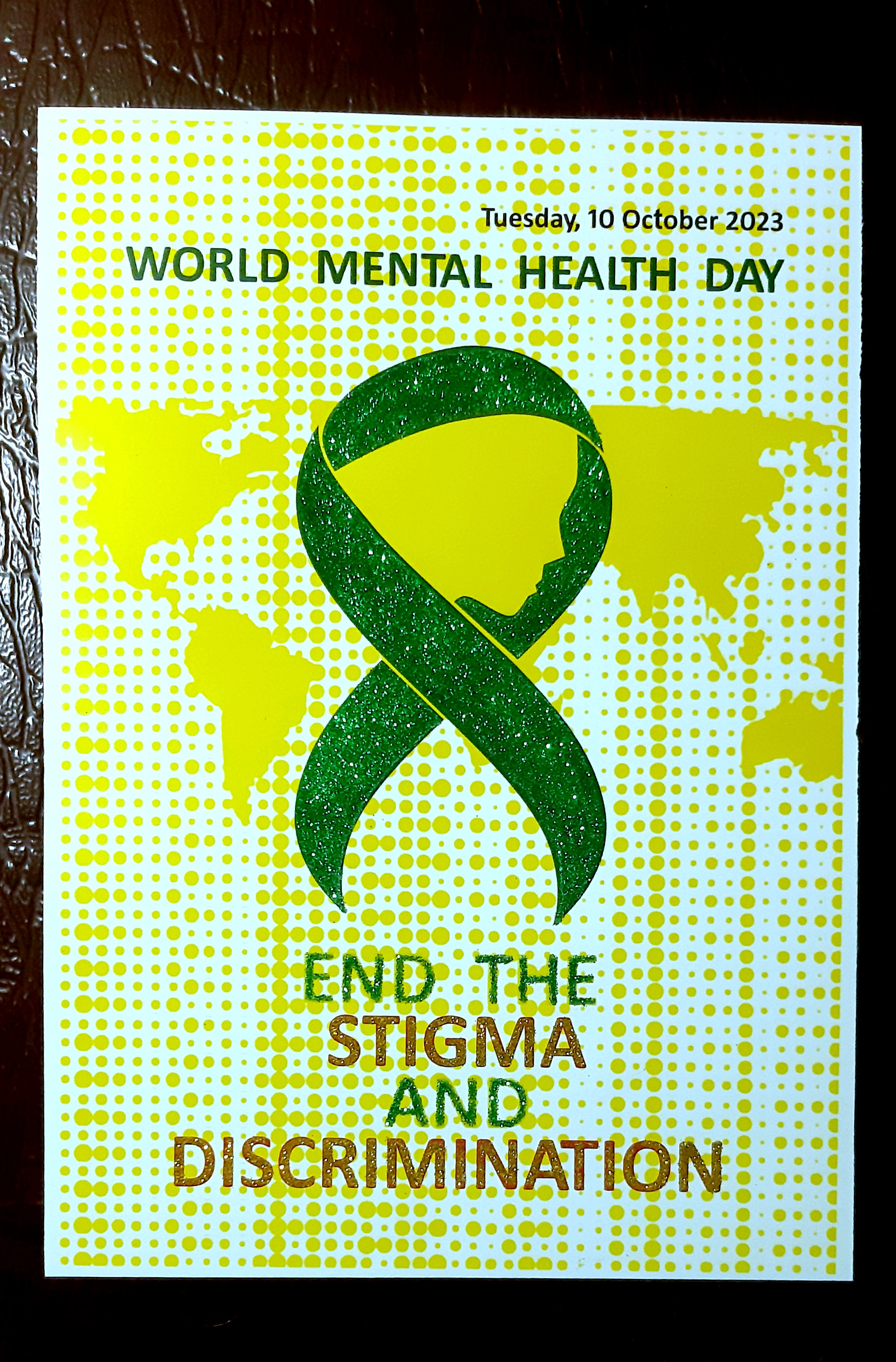
A poster for World Mental Health Day 2023 in Mexico. The green ribbon is the symbol of mental health awareness in the country.

Mexico faces a significant and growing mental health crisis, with an estimated one in four individuals affected by conditions such as depression, anxiety, post-traumatic stress disorder (PTSD), and Substance use disorder. In 2025, Depression affected approximately 12% of the adult population and is one of the leading causes of disability in Mexico. Despite this burden, only 2% of Mexico's national health budget is allocated to mental health, with the majority directed toward large, centralized psychiatric hospitals rather than community-based or preventive services.

Mexico suffers from a critical shortage of mental health professionals, with only 0.2 psychiatrists and 3 psychologists per 100,000 people in 2020, among the lowest ratios in Latin America. This shortfall has led to long waiting periods, inadequate follow-up, and limited access to psychological therapy, particularly in rural and low-income areas. Medication shortages—especially of essential drugs such as lithium and clozapine—further undermine treatment outcomes, leading to preventable relapses and hospitalizations.

Efforts to reform the mental health system date back to the 1990 Regional Conference for the Restructuring of Psychiatric Care in Latin America, which led to the adoption of the Caracas Declaration. This declaration emphasized the importance of integrating mental health services into primary healthcare and protecting the rights of individuals with non-physical disabilities. In alignment with these goals, the Mexican government established the National Council on Mental Health (Consejo Nacional de Salud Mental) in 2004 as part of the federal Health Ministry. Despite these structural reforms, the national health insurance program Seguro Popular, also introduced in 2004 to expand access to health services, failed to significantly improve mental health care coverage for low-income and underserved populations.

Despite these ongoing challenges, some initiatives offer critical support. The Médecins Sans Frontières (MSF) (Doctors Without Borders) Comprehensive Care Centre in Mexico City provides free, multidisciplinary services to survivors of extreme violence, including migrants and internally displaced people. The center offers psychological therapy, medical care, legal aid, and shelter assistance, and is one of the few facilities offering long-term care for trauma-related disorders. Nationwide 24/7 mental health hotlines such as SAPTEL and Línea de la Vida (Life Line) also provide free emotional support and crisis intervention services.

== Accessibility ==
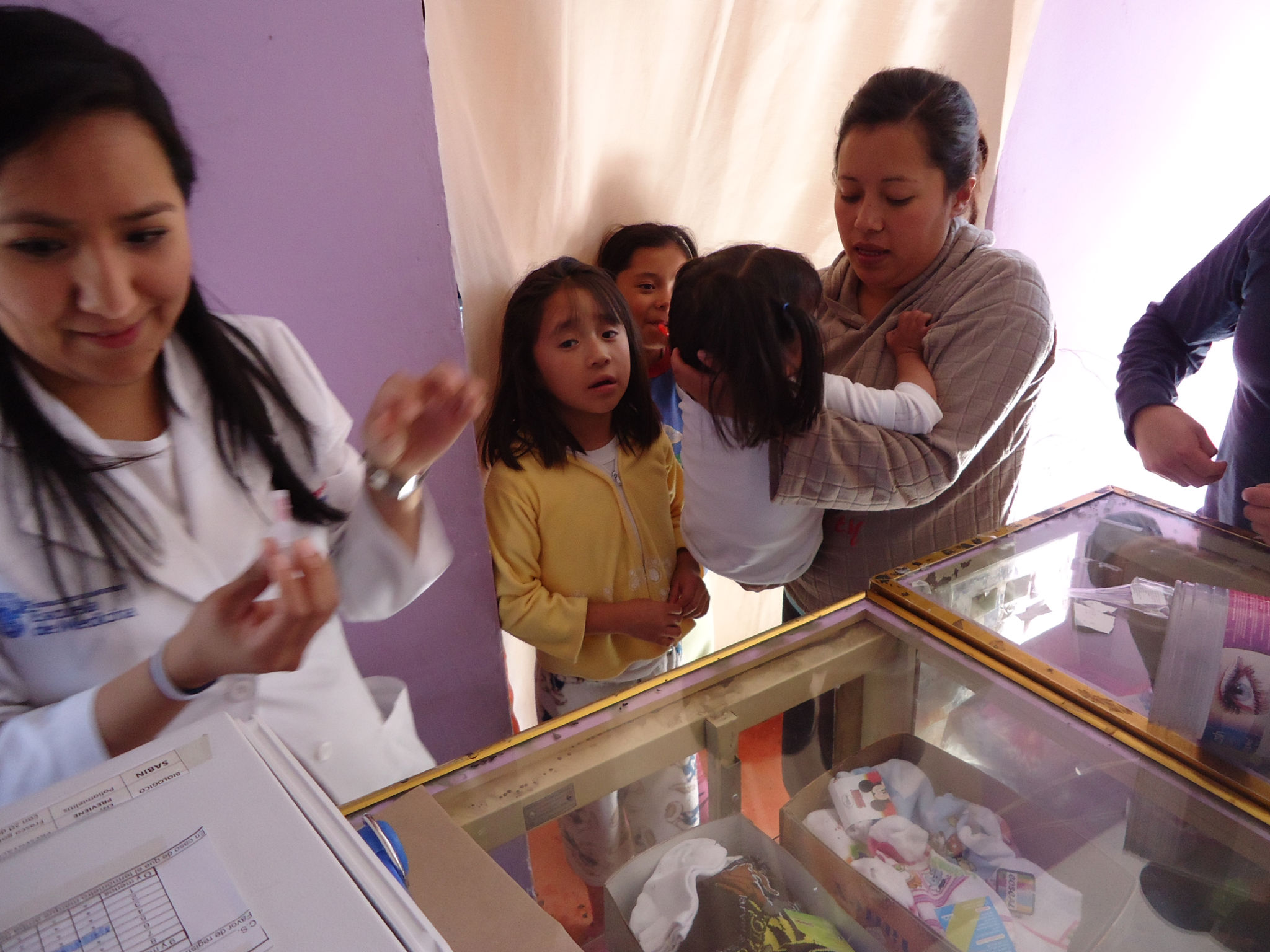
Vaccination of pediatric patients in San Miguel Topilejo, Mexico.

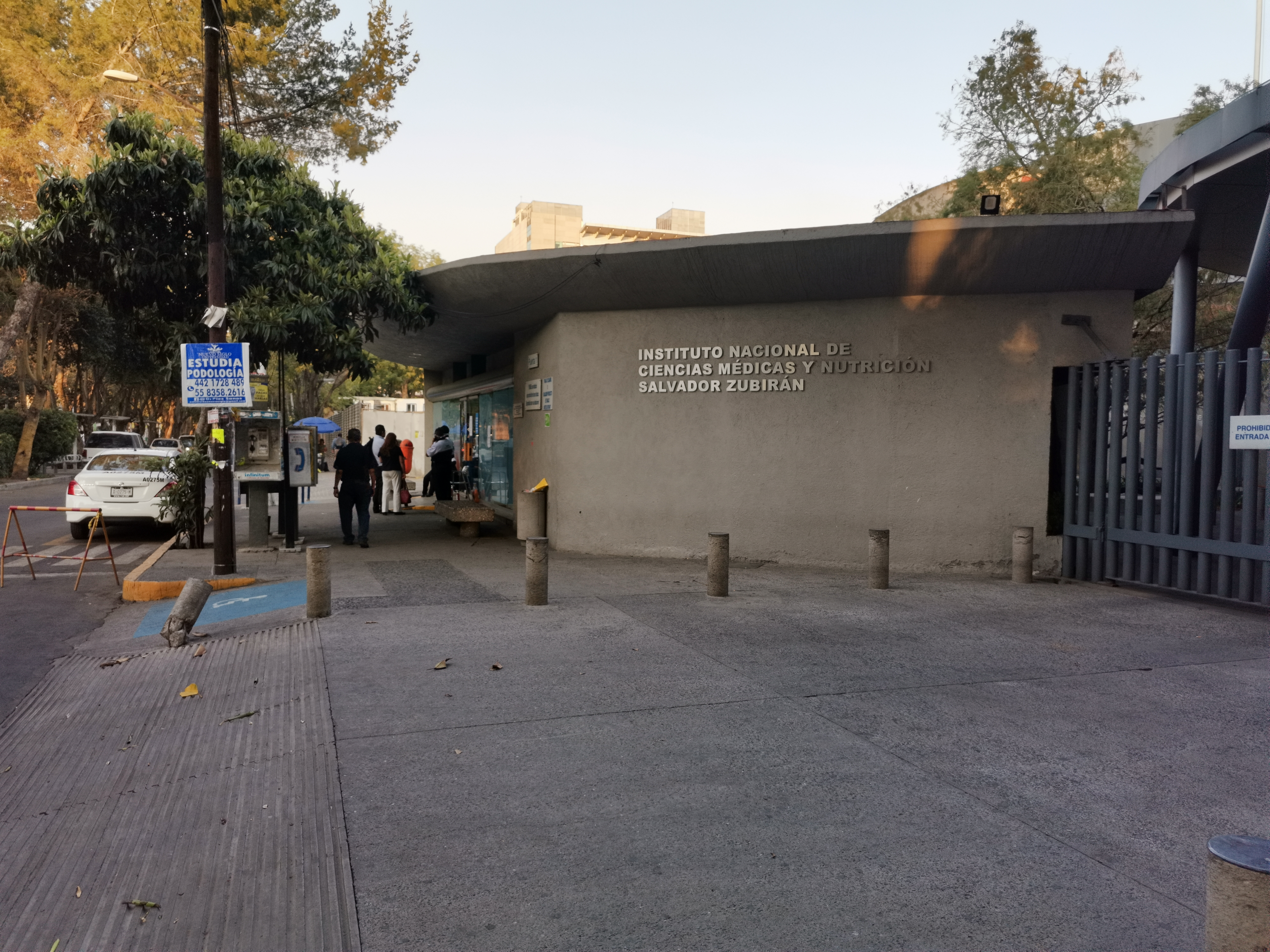
People entering a "respiratory illness symptom assessment area" at the Instituto Nacional de Ciencias Médicas y Nutrición Salvador Zubirán, Mexico City, Mexico. The hospital was converted into a special care area for the 2020 COVID-19 pandemic patients.

The Mexican healthcare system remains a continually expanding and progressive structure. Mexico first began enacting initiatives to extend health coverage, particularly in rural communities in 1979. Data from a national survey in 2012 demonstrated that a majority of Mexicans maintain a positive perception on the quality of their primary care. In 2013, a report by the Ministry of Health projected that over 90% of the population was covered.

There are some areas where inequities in accessibility can be seen. A 2008 national survey revealed stark disparities in accessibility despite expansion of services and coverage association, demonstrating that despite enhancements to the national health systems, inequities in accessibility of institutions, care, diagnostic services, medication, and travel were pronounced, especially as it related to rural and impoverished communities. These include insurance coverage, cost reduction, primary care association, and specialized services accessibility.

=== Insurance coverage ===
Insurance coverage rates across Mexico have been marked by a recent period of large growth. The induction of Seguro Popular (People's Health Insurance), the coverage program targeted at individuals who do not receive coverage under IMSS or ISSSTE, in 2003 spurred massive growth in insurance coverage across Mexico. A couple years after the plan was introduced, Seguro Popular became the second largest health institution by coverage in the nation. Within this, the percentage of insured poor families increased by five times— to include more than a third of this demographic. Inequities between public and private expenditure, as well as the distribution of these expanded services, began to lessen.

In 2015, it was projected that the proportion of the Mexican population with no access to health insurance decreased by close to seventy percent across this period, with only about 18% of the population falling under this group currently. This effect has been particularly effective in treating the older demographics. In 2012, it was observed that 4.3 million households in the nation possessed no health coverage of any kind, with an additional 7.6 million households associated with partial coverage of some members only.

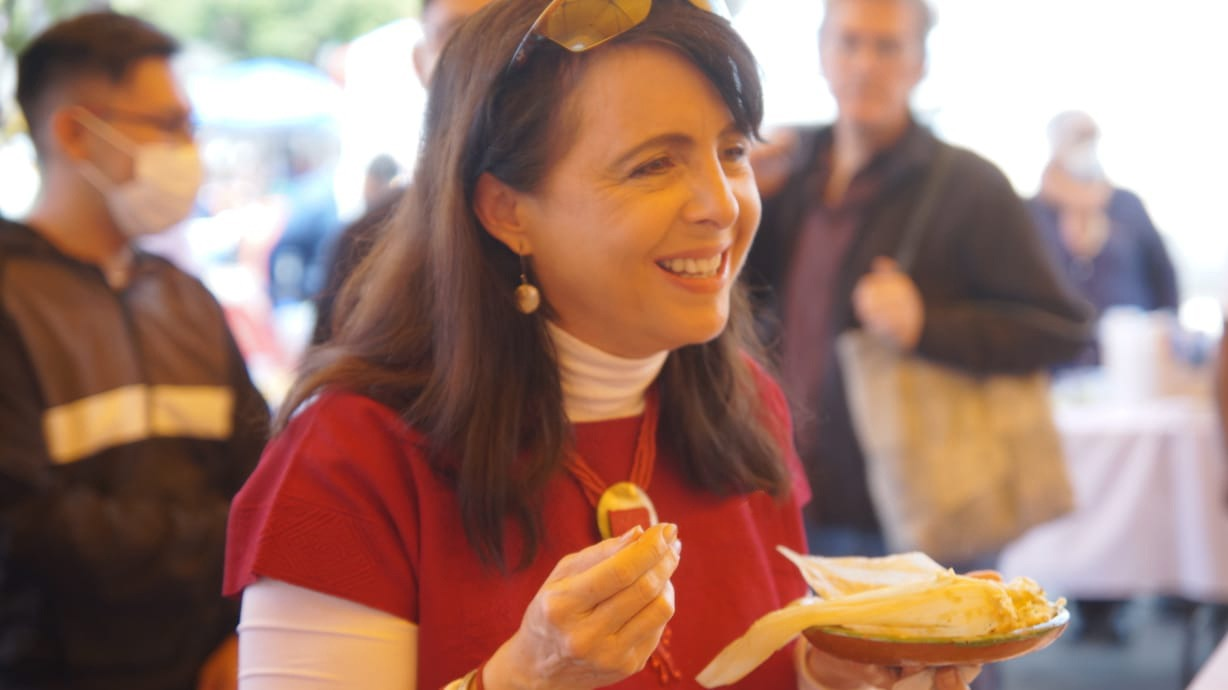
María Elena Álvarez-Buylla Roces Geneticist and researcher in biological sciences, known for her contributions to understanding genetic diversity and its implications for health.

In Mexico, where government-sponsored health insurance coverage remains a stark limitation characteristic of the system, self-medication is observed in increased proportions. Over 30 million Mexicans, especially those associated with older, uneducated, and low socioeconomic backgrounds. This may be indicative of societal attitudes toward the current system. This notion is furthered by the large proportions of residents who postpone reception of initial services, have little to no connection to preventative care specialists, and heavily use alternative medicinal practice. Over 500 over-the-counter drugs are available in the Mexican market. This enhanced availability of over-the-counter drugs has also contributed to the practice of self-medication.

=== Cost ===
Cost of healthcare services in Mexico is variable and dependent on the nature of the service and the institution utilized. Generally, health costs associated with use of the public healthcare sector are higher than their private counterparts. Individuals not insured under any current health insurance scheme most often utilize private doctors instead of public institutions.

A 2015 study by Doubova et al. determined that roughly four percent of the uninsured population was faced with catastrophic expenditure of some sort at some point. It was found that over half of uninsured individuals had not accessed care despite having a health issue due to financial issues. A 2013 report by Munoz established that in the period following the implementation of the new 2003 health reform to the end of the decade, out-of-pocket patient expenditures, related to hospitalization, visit, medicine, diagnostic tests, alternative options, dental care, prolonged treatments, among others, had remained relatively similar.

Comparative analysis of the cost of Mexican healthcare services costs has been performed by analysts. In 1992, The New York Times reported that residents of the United States living near the Mexican border routinely crossed into Mexico for medical care. Popular specialties included dentistry and plastic surgery. In 2007, The Washington Post reported that Mexican dentists charged 20-25% of US prices, and other procedures typically cost a third of the US price.

=== Problems of lack of access to healthcare ===
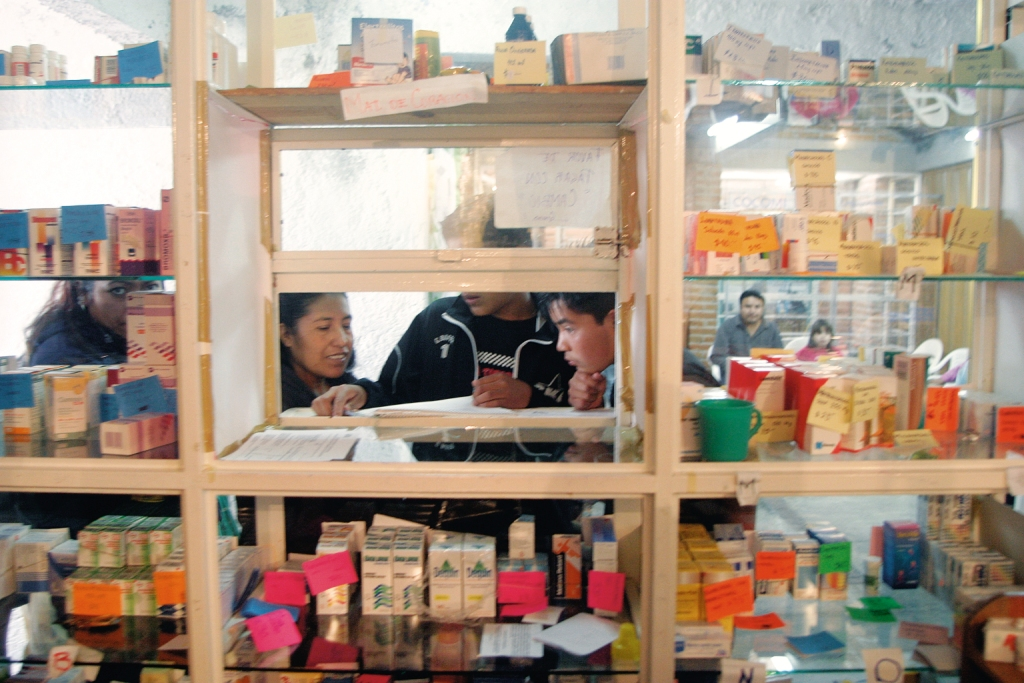
Health outpost operations in Iztapalapa, Mexico City

Factors that have demonstrated influence on the magnitude of accessibility available to healthcare include sparse distribution of institutional resources, and lack of specialized care services in isolated populations. Case studies involving clinical management of diarrheic disease in rural communities have emphasized concerns relating to the quality and range of services available to more isolated populations.

Rural accessibility has been a heavily studied topic and work here has revealed the existence of great disparities in breadth and effectiveness of services offered. Issues related to accessibility of specialized services, especially institutions offering forms of care related to mental health, are prevalent in rural communities. Factors such as location, transportation, and the economic cost of implementation are the main factors associated with this.

==== Rural remoteness ====
Due to political and socioeconomic factors, Mexico's Indigenous communities are one of the groups that has faced inequities in mental health care. Indigenous communities are likely to live in remote areas where they may be unable to access health services, exposed to pollution, and live in areas being exploited for their natural resources. Although studies have found that it is socio-economic status as opposed to ethnicity that influences the use of programs like SP, Indigenous communities are more likely to live in extreme poverty.

Treatment for mental health in Indigenous communities encounters a cultural barrier. Although the need for services exists, treatment has been typically conducted by community "healers". The negative stigma that mental health carries is seen to prevent treatment carried during early indication periods.

Urban populations are also subject to unique issues and conflicts, mostly related to delivery and the ability of the institutions to service the large populations they are associated with.

==== Preventative care ====
Preventative care is still an under-focused area across Mexico. A 2015 projection model found that almost a quarter of the Mexican population did not have a regular primary care provider or institution that year.

Mexico is facing a steady incline of cancer across their low-income population, mostly with breast cancer and health facilities were taking a major hit to combat it. As more advanced technology for cancer development was released, studies showed a huge decrease in breast cancer related deaths as health facilities insisted more people to get regular checkups.

Many people of Mexico are continuing to move into larger cities in which the smaller rural and urban comminutes are becoming increasingly overcrowded. With the new growth in population the cities are struggling to build and provide housing only for this to skyrocket air pollution rates. Lilian Calderón-Garcidueñas noted that many of the young children's nervous systems were under attack which alarmed many not just over children's overwhelming health concerns, but adult health issues as well.

Even though the Mexican Healthcare system has improved greatly over many years of reform, it has been incredibly unattainable with the cost for healthcare when it comes to out-of-pocket situations. International Journal for Equity in Health explained that this is not the only problem the population of Mexico is facing, many of the hospitals are delivering low quality services, not enough medicine to treat illnesses, and mistreatment.

=== Universal health care ===
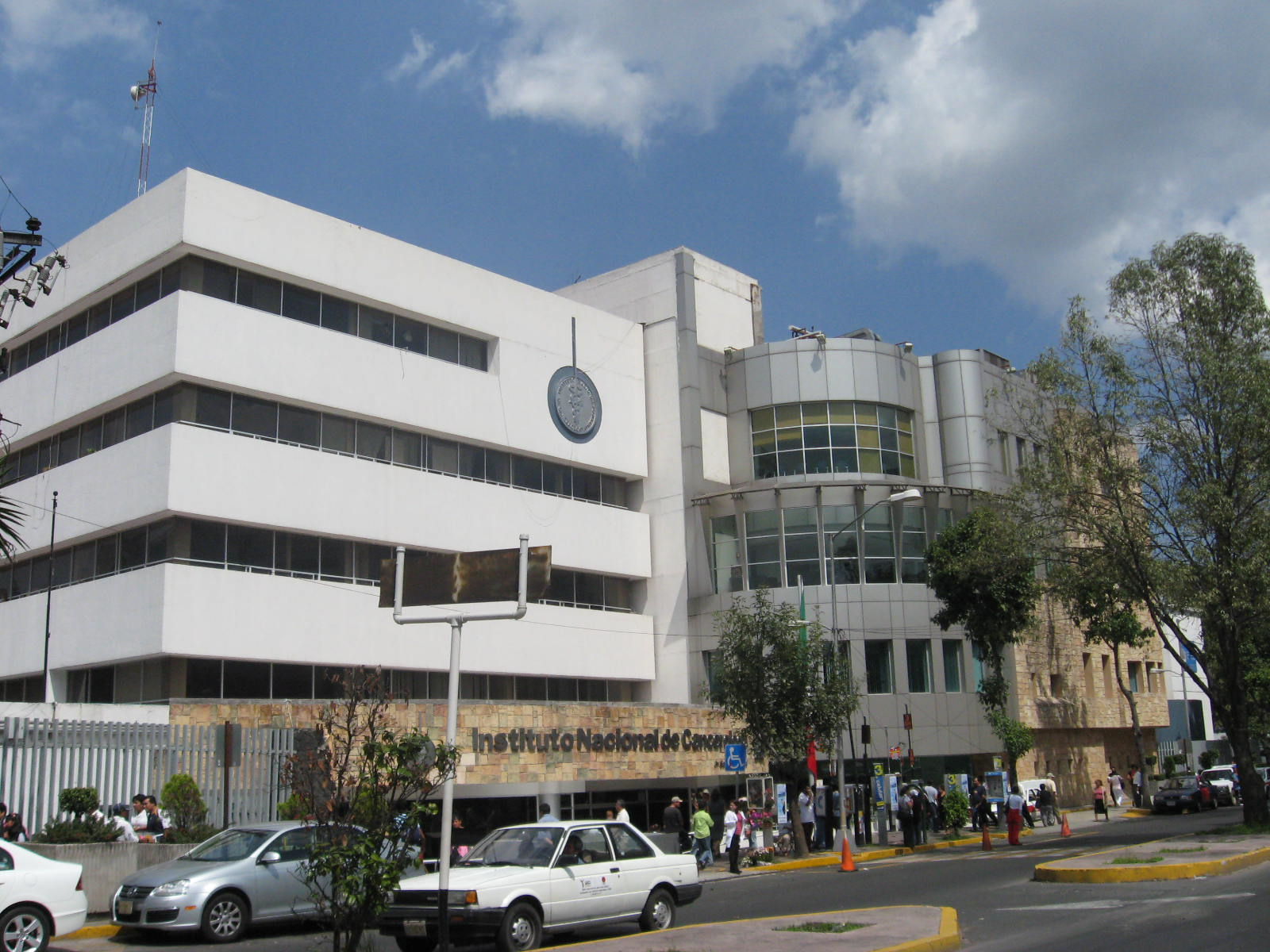
The Instituto Nacional de Cancerología (The National Oncology Institute) located in Mexico City.

In December 2006, the Mexican government created the Health Insurance for a New Generation (also called "Life Insurance for Babies"). It was followed by a February 2009, announcement by President Felipe Calderon, who stated that at the current rate, Mexico would have universal health coverage by 2011, and a May 2009 announcement of universal coverage for pregnant women. In August 2012, Mexico achieved universal healthcare coverage.

However, a 2023 article published by the Council on Foreign Relations stated "Mexico is a study in contrasts: once a model for how to do health system reform, now a model of what not to do" and reported that Seguro Popular was eliminated without a replacement.

== See also ==
- Social determinants of health in Mexico
- COVID-19 pandemic in Mexico
- Instituto de Salud para el Bienestar
- List of hospitals in Mexico
- Ruy Pérez Tamayo
- Salvador Zubirán
