= Social determinants of health in Mexico =

Factors influencing health in Mexico

Social determinants of health in Mexico are factors that influence the status of health among certain populations in Mexico. These factors consist of circumstances in which people grow, live, work, and age, as well as the systems put in place to deal with illnesses.

In Mexico, the health inequality among the population is influenced by such social factors. In the past decade, Mexico has witnessed immense progress within their health care system that has allowed for greater access to health care and a decrease in mortality rate, yet there are still various health inequalities caused by social factors.

Flag of Mexico

== Definitions ==
Social determinants of health are useful when identifying risk factors that affect the health of an individual or group. Health is defined as "the overall condition of someone's body or mind". As accessed by the World Health Organization, some major determinants of whether one is healthy or not include "the social and economic environment, the physical environment, and the person's individual characteristics and behaviours". Social determinants of health, as described by the World Health Organization, include income and social status, education, social support networks, health services, gender, employment status and conditions, and race and ethnicity.

== Poverty ==
In Mexico, poverty is reported using the Multidimensional Poverty Index and the Human Development Index. Together, these indicators suggest the overall poverty gradient of Mexico. The government's social development agency reported a 0.6 percent drop of Mexico's poverty rate from 2010 to 2012, but there are still 53.3 million people under the poverty line. A major effect of this poverty rate is the continuation of a huge wealth gap. Although there is a huge gap between the top ten percent and the bottom ten percent, Mexico has seen an increase in the percentage of Mexicans who are within the middle-class category.

The poverty within Mexico can be separated into two categories: moderate and extreme. Both categories total to about 45.5 percent of the total population of 117.3 million people. According to El Consejo Nacional de Evaluación de la Política de Desarrollo Social, also known as Coneval, there was a decrease in the percent of the Mexican population in extreme poverty, but an overall increase in the number of people that fall under the poverty line. The study showed that the extreme poverty rate fell from 11.3 percent to 9.8 percent, while the moderate poverty rate increased from 34.8 percent to 35.6 percent.

The correlation between poverty and health can be described as a negative relationship in which as poverty increases, health decreases. With a low income, families do not have the desired access to nutrition, resources, and health care as well as a means to reach these necessities.

== Gender ==
Gender is a major factor that influences the health inequity among the Mexican population. There's a certain gender bias within general health and specific diseases. Gender inequality can be described as "the departure from parity in the representation of women and men in key dimensions of social life." In Mexico, machismo still affects many parts of the country and the effect that it has on gender roles in a patriarchal society. According to the World Health Organization, a major step towards improving the overall health of the population would be gender empowerment. According to the 2012 National Survey of Health and Nutrition (ENSANUT), 38 percent of Mexican women aged 20–29 suffer abuses at home with more than 34.9 percent in public. With results like these, Mexico witnesses a huge gender bias that could explain major problems that emerge from within the household as well as those that partake in the work force. In the Mexican work force, women generally receive lower wages than men, even with educational levels taken into consideration. The median wage for female skilled technicians is 97.3 percent of what their male counterparts make, teachers with 97.6 percent, and female industrial supervisors make 68.4 percent of what males make in that same field. The gender inequity can be emphasized with the fact that there has not been "a female head of state and has had very few female cabinet members." This explains the "26 percent of equality with men in the political sphere" and that of "42 percent within the economic and legal spheres." This gender inequality produces a gender bias that favors men. Women then lack the necessary access to resources such as medical care, transportation, and nutrition.

== Education ==
Level of educational attainment is a major determinant of health in Mexico. More education generally leads to increased income, better employment opportunities, and improved living conditions; these, in turn, lead to improved health. The educational system in Mexico has witnessed low enrollment as well as low student-achievement. According to the United Nations Educational, Scientific, and Cultural Organization (UNESCO) Institute for Statistics, 99% of children are enrolled in pre-primary school. Furthermore, 96% of girls and 95% of boys are in primary school. Evaluating data on secondary schools across the nation, only 69% of girls and 66% of boys are enrolled in secondary education. The data also shows that 28% of the population of tertiary age are in tertiary education.

The low enrollment can be correlated with the need for Mexican families to utilize all means to an income and having the whole family seek employment, even at a young age. A factor that can affect the low student-achievement is the matter of children lacking focus as a result of nutritional deprivation. Health indirectly influences education in the same way that education indirectly influences the health of an individual.

== Location ==
Location affects overall health and "chances of leading flourishing lives". Location affects the daily living conditions that people endure which in turn affects health equity. There are various differences between urban and rural living conditions. According to the 2011 Latin American Report on Poverty and Inequality, over the past decade, both national and urban inequality have decreased, yet rural inequality has increased. World Bank data reports that about 61% of those living in rural areas live in extreme poverty. The major causes for such social and economic gaps between these two sectors come from "a manifestation of spatially-differentiated patterns of economic development". A major factor to such disparity is the "absence of rural development policy planning", especially because the "highest public spending on rural development benefits the country's richest states".

=== Urban ===
Urban areas seem to be overpopulated with almost one-third of the population living in four major metropolitan areas-20 million people living in Mexico City alone. This major urbanization represents the differences in living standards as well as access to health and social services. The lack of adequate housing within urbanized cities represents a major problem.

According to research conducted by the Office of Population Research at Princeton University, the main causes of mortality in rural areas are infectious diseases and malnutrition. Moreover, chronic disease and other health problems associated with industrialization dominate mortality within urban areas. A report from the World Health Organization states that about 32% of the total urban population in Latin America dwell in slums. Slums do not provide the best access to sufficient living conditions. The same report details "the shift in population levels of weight towards obesity" due to nutrition transition that begins in cities.

=== Rural ===
Rural regions in Mexico comprise more than 80% of the land and house around 37 million people (36% of the population). These statistics confirm that Mexico is the country with "the largest population [that lives] in predominantly rural areas" within the Organisation for Economic Co-operation and Development. Additionally, the standards of living in rural populations are much lower than its urban counterpart and the gap is larger than OECD standards. The major drawbacks are the lack of good shelter, adequate drainage, and access to electricity. Within dispersed rural areas, about 68% of the houses had a solid floor, 52% had drainage, yet 87% had electricity.

== Malnutrition ==
In August 2020, Dr. Hugo López-Gatell, Undersecretary of Health Prevention and Promotion, criticized the poor diet of many Mexicans, emphasizing the need to cut down on or leaving out soft drinks and junk food. He said that good health is more dependent upon good nutrition than on going to health clinics for medicine, and he called soft drinks "bottled poison."

Dr. Simón Barquera, director of Center for Research of Nutrition and Health of the Instituto Nacional de Salud Pública (National Public Health Institute, INSP) said that more sugary drinks are consumed than fruits and vegetables. He noted that 75.1% of Mexicans are overweight, and that obesity increases the severity of COVID-19 by 47%. "México se encuentra en medio de una sindemia de mala nutrición y COVID-19 que requiere acción inmediata" ("Mexico is in the midst of a poorly nutritioned syndemia and COVID-19 that requires immediate action"), he added.

Oaxaca and Tabasco were the first two states to prohibit the sale of soft drinks and junk food to children and teens under 18.

== Steps for improvement ==
In the mid-1990s, the Secretaría de Desarrollo Social introduced the Oportunidades program (formerly known as PROGRESA), which is a multi-sector policy that brought upon conditional cash transfers. Oportunidades dispenses money directly to poor households in return the families send their children to school, health services, and provide them with better nutrition by attending classes. Results from a study published in 2004 show that there have been improvements in overall health associated with better outcomes in child health, growth, and development.

SEDESOL logo 2012

In 2003, Mexico's Congress enacted reforms to Mexico's health legislation that aimed at making health care available nationwide. Mexico's former Minister of Health, Julio Frenk, as the original architect, implemented Seguro Popular which has insured 52.6 million previously-uninsured Mexicans. With the implementation of this universal health care, more Mexicans can now access the health services in their community.

In 2008, the World Health Organization's Commission on Social Determinants of Health developed a plan of action to tackle the problems that social determinants of health have on health equity. The recommendations consist of "improving daily living conditions, tackle the inequitable distribution of power, money, and resources, and measure and understand the problem and assess the impact of action."

== See also ==
- Healthcare in Mexico
