= International rankings of Mexico =

These are the international rankings of Mexico.

== Human development ==
The Human Development Report 2023/24 by the United Nations was released on 13 March 2024; the report was calculated based on data collected in 2022. Mexico was ranked 77 in the year 2022.

== Political corruption ==
- 2023 Corruption Perceptions Index ranked 126

== General rankings ==
Organization	Survey	Ranking
Human Development Index	Human Development Report 2009	53 out of 182
The Global Information Technology	The Global Information Technology Report 2009-2010	78 out of 133
Corruption Perceptions Index	Corruption Perceptions Index 2009	89 out of 180
Reporters Without Borders	Worldwide Press Freedom Index 2009	138 out of 175
The Heritage Foundation/The Wall Street Journal	Index of Economic Freedom 2010^{[unfit]}	41 out of 175
Transparency International	Corruption Perceptions Index 2023	126 out 180
Networked Readiness Index	Networked Readiness Index 2008–2009	67 out of 134
Fund for Peace	Failed State Index 2009	98 out of 187
The Observatory of Economic Complexity	Economic Complexity Ranking	20 out of 128

Organization	Survey	Ranking
Institute for Economics and Peace	Global Peace Index	108 out of 144
United Nations Development Programme	Human Development Index	53 out of 182
Transparency International	Corruption Perceptions Index	98 out of 180
World Economic Forum	Global Competitiveness Report	60 out of 133
World Intellectual Property Organization	Global Innovation Index, 2026	65 out of 139
