= 2009 Mexican elections =

A number of elections, both federal and local, were scheduled to take place in Mexico during 2009.

== 2009 Legislative elections ==
In 2009 there was a number of elections going on in Mexico. This included elections from Local governments all the way up the ladder to federal elections. Some state positions, as well as federal positions, were up for election.

The 2009 legislative elections were held on July 5, 2009. The election that was being decided was 500 new members in the Chamber of Deputies for the 61st Congress. This election was statistically really close. The Elections were won by the PRI party also known as the Institutional Revolutionary Party. They had 12,591,855 Votes resulting in them getting 48.2% of the Chamber of Deputies. The PRI was followed by the PAN party also known as the National Action Party and the PRD party also known as the Party of the Democratic Revolution. They had 9,549,798 and 4,164,393 votes that rewarded them 147 and 72 spots in the chamber of Deputies respectively.

As a result of this, the leader of the PRI party Beatriz Parades stated that "We are the indisputable main force in the country" This came after they found out that they would be winning the Chamber Of Deputies majority.

== Felipe Calderon's influence ==
Many people saw the president Felipe Calderon as a big influence as to why the National Action Party (PAN) finished second in the elections. President Calderon was a part of the PAN party. At the time of the elections, Mexico's economy was weak, which in many eyes hurt his party's chances at winning the election. "He got a beating because of the economy," said Ana Maria Salazar, a television and radio political commentator in Mexico City. "The government in power pays for it," said Peter Hakim, president of the Washington-based Inter-American Dialogue. With all this being said Calderon did acknowledge the fact that his party lost in a triumphant way by saying "The federal government recognizes the new composition of the Chamber of Deputies since it is a sovereign decision of the citizens. I congratulate who they have chosen," he also stated that he'd work with these new representatives that got into office.

== Local elections ==
Throughout 2009 there was 11 local state elections and 1 federal district local election. This Included the states of Quintana Roo, Campeche, Colima, Guanajuato, Jalisco, Nuevo León, Querétaro, San Luis Potosí, Sonora, Coahuila, and Tabasco. The federal district of Mexico City also had local elections.

Positions up for elections included Legislative Assembly, State Congress, Governor, Municipalities, and Borough Mayors.

The Majority of these elections took place on July 5, 2009, going hand in hand with the legislative elections but a few were different. Quintana Roo's Election took place on February 1, 2009. The state of Coahuila took place on September 24, 2009. The state of Tabasco elections took place on October 18, 2009.

Mexico Cities federal district was different from the rest as they voted for Legislative Assembly and Borough Mayors rather than state congress and Governors since they technically aren't a state.
