= Hugo López-Gatell =

Mexican physician, researcher, professor and public official

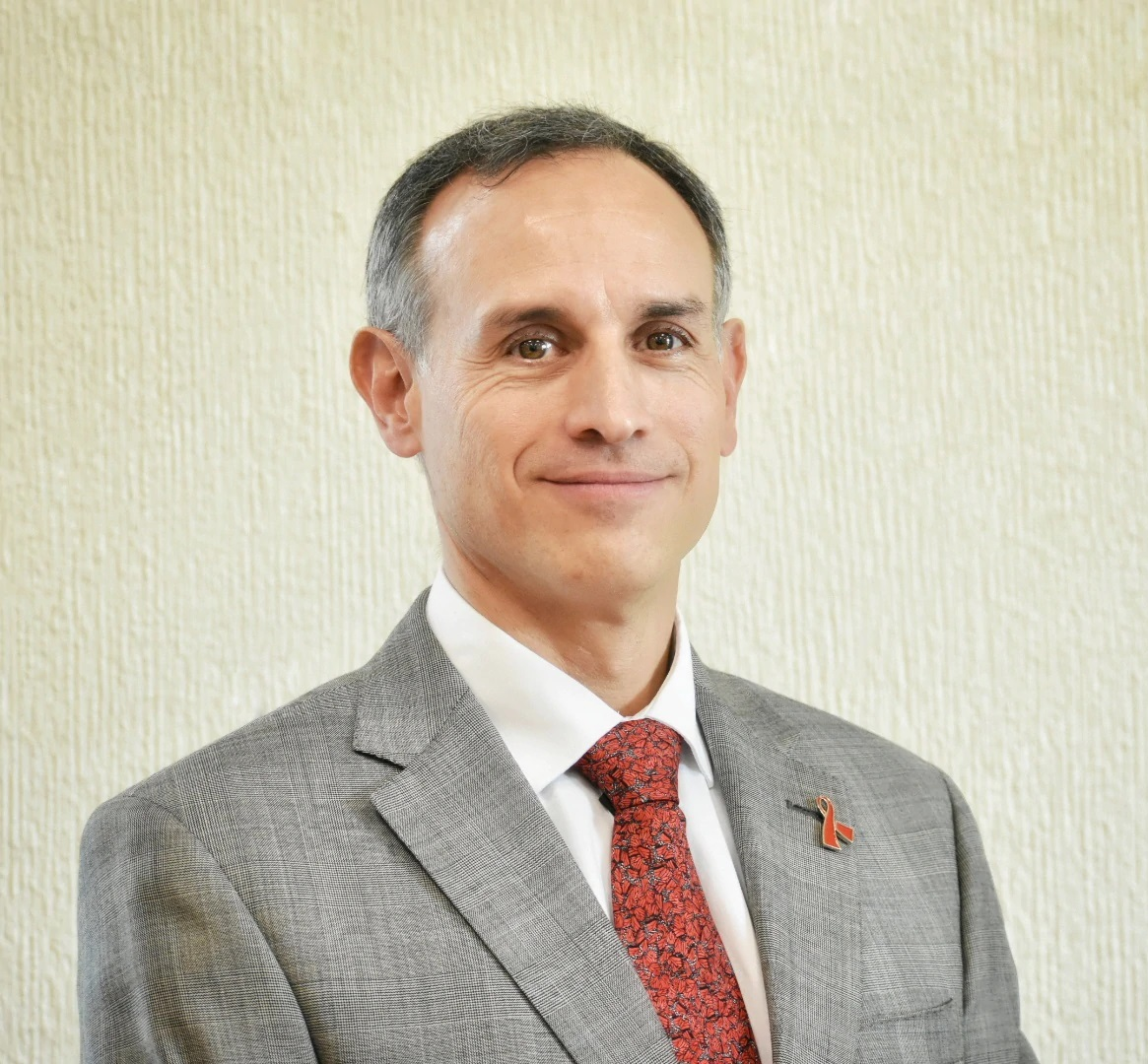

Deputy Secretary of Prevention and Health Promotion of Mexico
- Incumbent
- Assumed office 1 December 2018
- President: Andrés Manuel López Obrador
- Preceded by: Pablo Kuri-Morales

Personal details
- Born: Hugo López-Gatell Ramírez; February 22, 1969 (age 57) Mexico City, Mexico
- Secretary: Jorge Alcocer Varela
- Scientific career
- Education: National Autonomous University of Mexico (MD, MS)
- Spouse(s): Arantxa Colchero (m. 1999; div. 2019), Rebeca Peralta-Mariñelarena (m. 2024 -)
- Fields: Epidemiology, Infectious Disease
- Workplaces: Salvador Zubirán National Institute of Health Sciences and Nutrition; Secretariat of Health

Hugo López-Gatell Ramírez is a Mexican epidemiologist, author, and public health official who has served as head of the Undersecretariat of Prevention and Health Promotion at the Mexican Secretariat of Health since 2018. Since January 2020, he has also been the spokesman and one of the lead members of the federal governments response to the COVID-19 pandemic in Mexico. The Covid-19 pandemic in Mexico exposed errors, improvisations, and negligence on the part of President Andrés Manuel López Obrador. The result: 297,000 people died, including nearly 5,000 healthcare workers, due to the government's decisions.

== Career ==
=== Education ===
López-Gatell attended the School of Medicine of the National Autonomous University of Mexico (UNAM) graduating in 1994 as Physician-Surgeon. Afterwards, he obtained a master's degree in medical sciences at UNAM in 2000, and later a Ph.D. degree in epidemiology from the Johns Hopkins Bloomberg School of Public Health at the Johns Hopkins University in 2006.

As a researcher, he has participated in 40 papers. In addition to clinical and academic roles, López-Gatell serves as an associate editor for scientific journals as Global Health Action of the Umeå Center for Global Health Research, The American Journal of Tropical Medicine and Hygiene of the American Society of Tropical Medicine and Hygiene, AIDS (official body of the International AIDS Society) and the academic journal of the Salvador Zubirán National Institute of Health Sciences and Nutrition (INCMNSZ).

=== Public service ===
In 2008 he was appointed deputy general director of Epidemiology at the Mexican Secretariat of Health. In that role, he led the improvement of the National Epidemiological Surveillance System (Sinave), a re-engineering of the Mexican public health system to improve reporting and detection of epidemiological surveillance.

In 2009, during the swine flue pandemic - caused by the H1N1/swine flu/ influenza virus - declared by the World Health Organization(WHO) from June 2009 to August 2010 López-Gatell promoted ideas and policies contrary to pandemic control and response recommendations similar to those he would advocate during COVID-19 pandemic. As a consequence of his perceived failure he was sidelined to the National Institute of Public Health where he would be responsible for the National Health Survey.

In 2023, Hugo López-Gatell Ramirez - contrary to numerous peer-reviewed articles - stated that the swine flu pandemic did not have its origins in Mexico.

From 2013 to 2018 he was Director of Innovation on Infectious Disease Surveillance and Control at Mexican Secretariat of Health.

On December 1, 2018, López-Gatell was appointed by Mexican President Andrés Manuel López Obrador head of the Undersecretariat of Prevention and Health Promotion in the Secretariat of Health. From the beginning of 2020 and after the rising of the COVID-19 pandemic López-Gatell has also applied his research and public service expertise as one of the main strategist and main spokesperson of Mexican Government on the 2020 coronavirus pandemic in Mexico. From March 6, 2020, López-Gatell is conducting a daily press conference where he and the Secretariat of Health directives are giving information also explanations about the official strategies and decisions.

On June 28, 2021, López-Gatell accused the protesting parents of children with cancer, blockading Mexico City International Airport to highlight ongoing shortages of cancer medications, of being part of an international right-wing campaign to foment a coup against the López Obrador administration. The backlash against López-Gatell saw him accuse economic, business and political interest groups of distorting his comments. He responded saying that felt empathy with the aggrieved parents and would work tirelessly to get obtain the required medicines.

=== COVID-19 pandemic ===
López-Gatell is strongly criticized for his handling of the COVID-19 pandemic in Mexico, along with several state health ministers like Enrique Perez Rico, the preparation, response and management were consistently the worst in the world according to multiple published papers. Currently, several NGO's along with the opposition National Action Party have formally accused him of criminal negligence. He has also been accused of under reporting infections numbers and associated deaths in order to downplay the severity of the pandemic, of misleading the public, for example by the former Minister of Health José Narro Robles and in a New York Times article, and of denying the usefulness of medical masks, testing and staying at home in order to avoid spreading the virus.

While many Mexicans reacted with sympathy to López-Gatell's announcement in February 2021 that he had tested positive for COVID-19, Samuel García Sepúlveda, a gubernatorial candidate in Nuevo León, called for him to resign, and former president Vicente Fox criticized him on social media.

On March 10, 2021, after still testing positive and admitting he was contagious, López-Gatell was photographed with his girlfriend Rebeca Peralta in a park in Colonia Condesa, Mexico City, without a face mask. The photos quickly went viral on social media. When asked about his actions, López-Gatell complained of greedy corporate media who have a political and economic agenda.

== Personal life ==
Hugo López-Gatell Ramírez was born on February 22, 1969, in Mexico City. His father, Francisco López-Gatell Trujillo, was a chemist, surgeon and urologist. His mother, Margarita Ramírez Duarte, was a nurse at the Hospital 20 de Noviembre. His paternal grandfather, Francisco López Gatell Comas, was a Spanish military engineer of Jewish descent born in Catalonia in 1897. He opposed the Franco regime and took refuge in France; later he fought against the Nazis in World War II. During the war he ended up in a concentration camp, eventually escaping to Mexico with his wife and three children.

As a young man, Hugo was part of a progressive rock band called Cantera; his companions would later be founding members of La Gusana Ciega and Santa Sabina.

He married and later divorced Arantxa Colchero Aragones.

On February 20, 2021, López-Gatell announced he had tested positive for the COVID-19 virus. Originally López-Gatell's symptoms were described as ″mild″, but on February 24 it was reported that he had a fever and needed supplemental oxygen. He was hospitalized at the Hospital Temporal Citi-Banamex.
