= Instituto Nacional de Cancerología (Mexico) =

Coordinates: 19.2895°N 99.1602°W

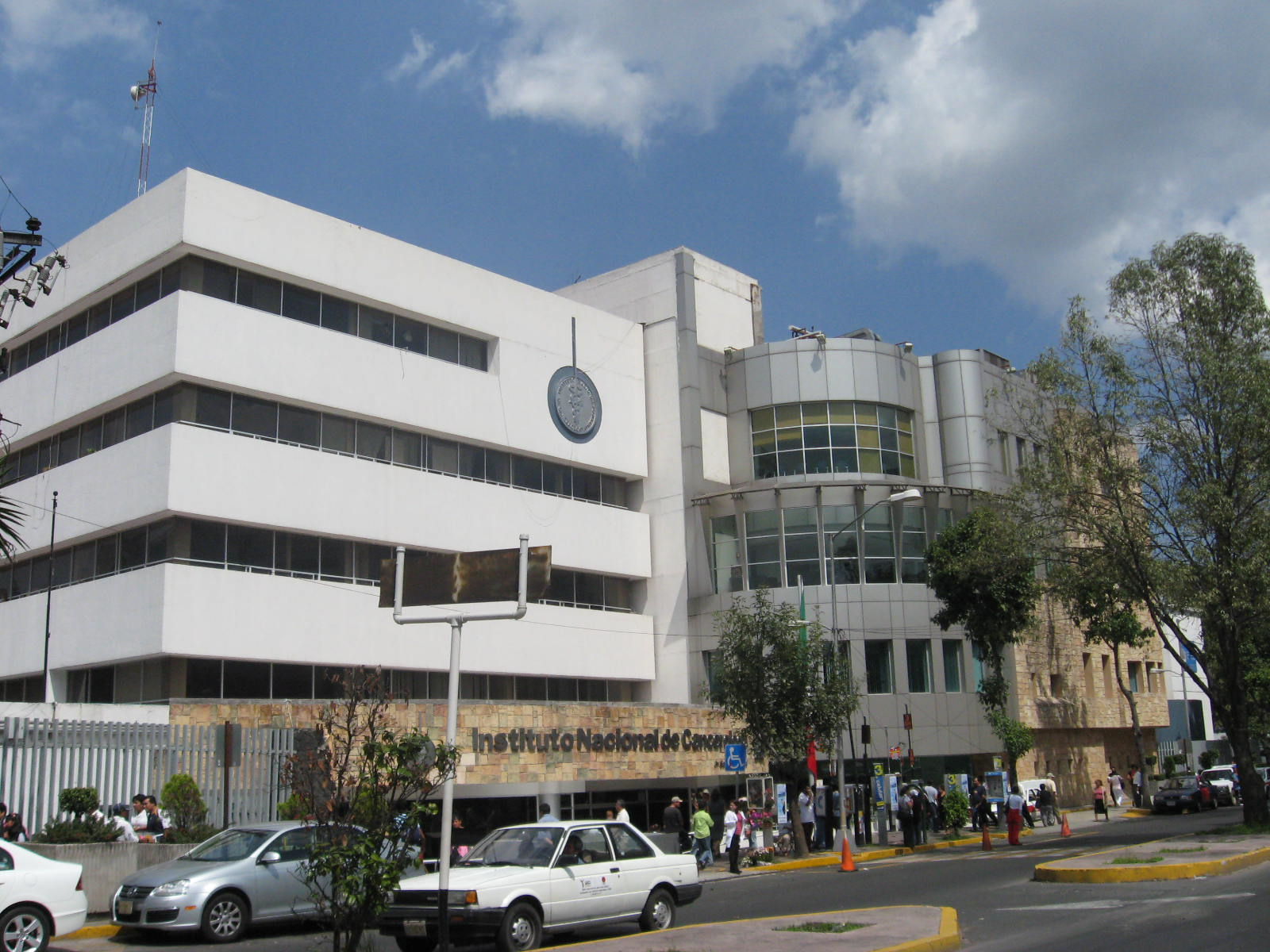

Geography
- Location: Av. San Fernando 22, col. Sección XVI, del. Tlalpan, Mexico City

Organisation
- Funding: Public hospital
- Affiliated university: Secretariat of Health (Mexico)

Services
- Emergency department: Yes
- Beds: 150

Links
- Website: http://www.incan-mexico.org/incan/incan.jsp

The Instituto Nacional de Cancerología (National Cancer Institute, abbreviated INCan) is a public institution administered by the Mexican Secretariat of Health which specializes in the treatment of cancer. It is one of 12 specialized hospitals that provides public health services and trains new resident doctors. It was created on November 25, 1946, by then-President Manuel Ávila Camacho.
