= Pablo Kuri-Morales =

Pablo Kuri Morales
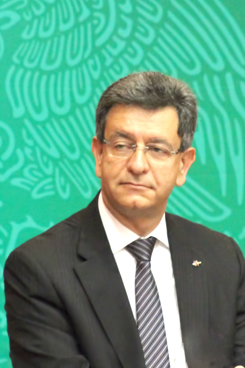

Deputy Secretary of Prevention and Health Promotion of Mexico
- In office 16 December 2011 – 30 November 2018
- President: Felipe Calderón; Enrique Peña Nieto
- Preceded by: Mauricio Hernández Ávila
- Succeeded by: Hugo López-Gatell Ramírez

Personal details
- Born: 10 November 1961 (age 64) Mexico City, Mexico
- Education: National Autonomous University of Mexico
- Profession: Epidemiologist

Pablo Kuri-Morales (born November 10, 1961) is a Mexican public health scientist and epidemiologist.

He is recognized as one of the world health experts in emergencies, security and pandemics. In 2009, he was involved in the response to the 2009 flu pandemic, and he has helped to lead the Mexican response to threats such as anthrax, influenza, ebola, and SARS. He has been part of more than 20 health fieldwork missions and headed the medical response to natural disasters including hurricanes Pauline, Ingrid, Manuel and Odile.

== Career ==
Kuri-Morales earned his medical degree from the National Autonomous University of Mexico (UNAM) along with a master's degree in science, specializing in public health. Kuri-Morales is a member of the National Academy of Medicine of Mexico, the Mexican Surgery Academy and the Mexican Public Health Society. He was the General Director of Epidemiology at the Undersecretariat of Prevention and Health Promotion in the Secretariat of Health from 1997 to 2006, transferring to head the National Center for Epidemiological Surveillance and Disease Control (CENAVECE) between 2007 and 2009. From 2009 to 2011, he worked in the private sector as the Scientific Director of Sanofi Aventis Mexico. He was Undersecretary of Health in Mexico from 2011 to 2018. He was Senior Official, representing Mexico for almost 15 years in the Global Health Security Initiative (G7 + Mexico)

He is currently an independent consultant.

== Teaching, research and publications ==
He was faculty, since 1986, at the UNAM Faculty of Medicine, supervising academic research on diverse topics and educating outstanding health specialists including epidemiologists, he retired in 2019. To date, he has more than 170 papers in national and international publications on issues relating to epidemiology, addiction prevention and public policies. He has written numerous chapters in books in his field of expertise, with more than 2,000 total citations.

== Awards ==
In 2015, Kuri-Morales was honored as the person of the year in the Premios ASPID, organized by the Iberoamerican Advertising Communication of Health and Pharmacy. In 2014, he received the Doctor Gerardo Varela Award from the Secretariat of Health.

His work “Histopathological registry of neoplasia in Mexico, 1994” obtained first place in the social research category in the Aida Weiss Cancer Program and the University Program of Health Research in October 1996.
