= Mercedes Juan López =

Mexican politician

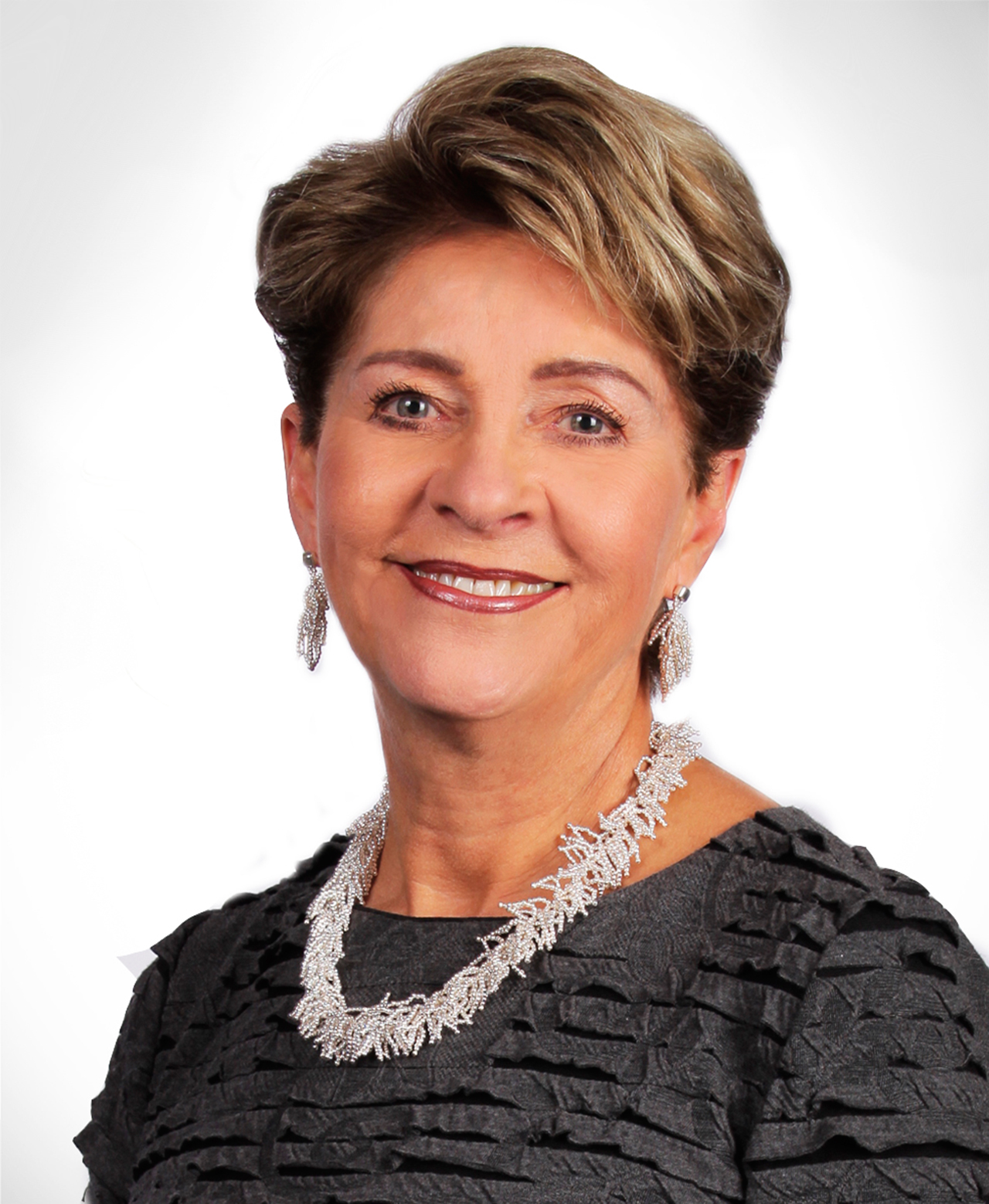

Secretary of Health
- In office 1 December 2012 – 8 February 2016
- President: Enrique Peña Nieto
- Preceded by: Salomón Chertorivski Woldenberg
- Succeeded by: José Narro Robles

Member of the Chamber of Deputies for the 4th Circumscription
- In office 1 September 1997 – 31 August 2000

Personal details
- Born: April 22, 1943 (age 83) Mexico City, Mexico.
- Party: Institutional Revolutionary Party
- Education: National Autonomous University of Mexico (MD)

Mercedes Martha Juan López (born 22 April 1943) is a Mexican doctor, member of the Institutional Revolutionary Party, has been a federal deputy and first female Secretary of Health between 1 December 2012 and 8 February 2016.

Mercedes Juan is a Surgeon graduated from the National Autonomous University of Mexico and has a specialty in rehabilitation medicine. From 1983 to 1988 she was technical secretary of the Health Cabinet of the Presidency of the Republic in the government of Miguel de la Madrid, and from 1988 to 1994 she was Assistant Secretary of Regulation and Health Promotion of the Ministry of Health, holding the same Jesús Kumate Rodríguez in the government of Carlos Salinas de Gortari.

Elected federal deputy through the plurinominal way in 1997 to the LVII Legislature that concluded in 2000 and in which she was vice-coordinator of the parliamentary faction of the PRI and vice president of the board of directors, secretary of the commission of Health and Population and Development; from 2001 to 2007 she was a member of the Social Council of the Governing Board of the National Institute for Women and in 2007 she was commissioner of Sanitary Operation of the Federal Commission for the Protection against Sanitary Risk (COFEPRIS). From September 2009 to November 2012, she was Executive President of the Mexican Foundation for Health A.C.
