= Obesity in Mexico =

Obesity in Mexico is a relatively recent phenomenon, having been widespread since the 1980s with the introduction of ultra-processed food into much of the Mexican food market. Prior to that, dietary issues were limited to under and malnutrition, which is still a problem in various parts of the country. Following trends already ongoing in other parts of the world, Mexicans have been foregoing the traditional Mexican diet high in whole grains, fruits, legumes and vegetables in favor of a diet with more animal products and ultra-processed foods. It has seen dietary energy intake and rates of overweight and obese people rise with seven out of ten at least overweight and a third clinically obese.

== History ==
=== Undernutrition vs. overnutrition ===
Share of adults that are obese

Until the late 20th century, dietary issues in Mexico were solely a question of undernutrition or malnutrition, generally because of poverty and distribution issues. For this reason, obesity was associated with wealth and health, the latter especially in children. Despite changes in the Mexican diet and food distribution, malnutrition still remains problematic in various parts of the country.

=== Nutrition transition ===
By the 1980s, Latin American populations began to experience widespread changes in their diet, away from produce and grains toward processed food in a manner similar to what had previously occurred in developed countries. The main reason for this shift is the dominance of transnational food companies in the Mexican market, following a trend seen in other parts of the world.

This shift was toward the consumption of high-energy -sugar, -fat, and -salt food featuring various types of sweeteners and animal products and a decrease in whole grains and vegetables. Animal proteins replaced vegetable, with a 50% increase in prevalence from the 1960s to the 1990s. The total cholesterol availability in Mexico surpasses the US guidelines for daily intake, at over 300 mg per day, a result of the increased availability of saturated fats.

The change was initially limited to more affluent urban groups that could afford processed foods and these groups showed an increase in health conditions associated with this diet, including obesity. These foods are easier and less time-consuming to prepare. With easier access to food providers and supermarkets, more affluent households also tend to buy more fruits, fish, eggs and vegetables and less oils and grains, while poorer urban households tend to choose foods that exceed their energy needs and lack essential vitamins and minerals. In a survey of 650 urban school lunches, none were graded as healthy and only one percent graded as adequate.

Since the 1980s, rural diets, that had consisted primarily of vegetables and very little animal or saturated fats, have shown declines in fruit and vegetable intake. In Northern Mexico, rural populations who transitioned from their traditional diets to more processed diets also experienced a dramatic increase in obesity and diabetes.

In addition to dietary changes, modern life has also made the Mexican population more sedentary. Traditional labor-intensive jobs in farming, factories and mining have given way to desk jobs. In addition, most people use motorized transportation instead of walking or biking. About 40% of Mexicans do not exercise.

=== Socioeconomic factors of obesity ===
Since the 1980s, many studies have been carried out intending to identify the one nutrient, food, or beverage that leads to weight gain and obesity. Sugar, fat, fast food, soft drinks, and the list goes on - all of them were suspect of being the reason for the worldwide increasing overweight and obesity rates and yet none of them could essentially be made responsible. However, the studies did prove that "each of [the examined dietary elements ] is associated with either obesity or weight gain" (Drewnowski, 2007). Furthermore, these elements have one characteristic in common which is their relative inexpensiveness (as opposed to fruits, vegetables, fresh juice etc.) and also, they are preferably bought by lower-income consumers (Drewnowski).

A review of studies (Dinsa et al.) analyzing the association between socioeconomic status (SES) and obesity among men, women, and children in developing countries found that in upper-middle-income countries like Mexico (Mexico is categorized as upper middle income (The World Bank) and middle HDI (UNDP)) obesity is highly prevalent. Middle-income and medium HDI countries showed a negative association between SES and obesity among women, i.e. the prevalence of obesity rises with decreasing income. The negative association becomes even clearer in countries growing into the high-income category. Among men, results have been mixed and the studies on children all revealed a positive association between SES and obesity.

First, an explanation for the positive association among children could be a shift in free time activity based on their family's affluence, e.g. children of more affluent families are more likely to have access to and probably spend more time with playing video games whereas children of less affluent families cannot afford such luxury goods and predominantly stick to more active free time activities and therefore have a higher energy expenditure that compensates for their energy intake. Second, the negative association among middle-income women in consideration of the above-mentioned expensiveness of most healthy products raises the question of whether the easier access to unhealthy, energy-dense and less expensive food is the crucial point to explain the high prevalence of obesity in Mexico (Dinsa et al.).

What Drewnowski describes as the "economics of food choice" is the fact that people have to manage their often scarce resources in a way that all basic expenditures (food, housing, clothing, school fees) are covered. Consequently, the kind of food people consume also, or primarily, depends on food prices (Dinsa et al., Drewnowski, Lozada et al.). While energy-dense products, rich in sugar and fats, cost less in relation to the energy they provide, low-energy healthy food like fruits and vegetables is more expensive in this respect (Drewnowski, 166). Furthermore, fruits and vegetables are now twice as expensive than 20 years ago whereas the costs of added sugar and fats did not change (Drewnowski, 162). To sum up, "foods, beverages, snacks, or diets said to promote obesity [are], in every case, inexpensive. In contrast, more costly dietary patterns [are] associated with leanness, weight maintenance, or greater weight loss" (Drewnoski, 166). In conclusion, low-income can be seen as an obstacle to a healthier diet as the consumption of "good" products may wear out the available budget.

Another aspect that deserves attention is that people of lower SES usually live in less secure neighborhoods where walking around might present a danger. In addition, these places, in general, do not show a lot of establishments that offer healthy food. As a study conducted in New York found, the "walkability" of one's neighborhood and the lack of availability of healthy food establishments are also predictors of obesity (Muñez Oliveira, 23).

Finally, although today Mexico shows a lower level of undernourishment, many of the now young adults used to suffer from nutritional stunting in early life, which is also considered to increase the risk of becoming overweight or obese later in life (Food and Agriculture Organization of the United Nations).

All in all, the socioeconomic factor as a determinant for food choice, living conditions, and possible indicators of past undernourishment has been proved to be a predictor of obesity and weight gain. Therefore, future policies countering obesity should aim at increasing the accessibility of healthy food alternatives for the less affluent population, e.g. by subsidizing fruits, vegetables, and fiber-rich whole grains. However, the creation of consciousness about the importance of healthy eating and physical activity among the population, and particularly among children, remains an essential measure as well.

=== Rates of obesity and consequences ===
After the widespread introduction of processed foods, obesity rates began to rise in the country. As of 2000, individual dietary energy intake has been speculated to be approximately 2,500–3,060 calories (10,500–12,800 kJ) per day, 30% more than in 1962. A 1999 survey found 24% of Mexican women were obese and an additional 35% were overweight; 55% men were either obese or overweight.

In a survey conducted by National Health Survey in 2000, it was found that the prevalence of obesity in the sample population was 67% in women and 61% in men. A similar survey in 2003 targeting obesity from rural, low-income communities showed that around 60% of women and 50% of men were considered either overweight or obese with respect to the Body Mass Index.

By 2010, seven out of ten Mexicans were overweight with a third obese. Mexico ranks the most obese country in the world in adult obesity (as of 2013), and first for childhood obesity with about 4.5 million children diagnosed as such. Mexico passed the United States as the most obese country in the world. The prevalence of overweight and obesity is 16.7% in preschool children, 26.2% in school children, and 30.9% in adolescents. For adults, the prevalence of overweight and obesity is 39.7 and 29.9%, respectively. Since the 1990s, fat has become the principal source of energy in the Mexican diet and it is assumed that the consumption of highly processed food will continue increasing. As a consequence, Mexico has seen the same kind of health issues that have affected other countries with overweight populations. Standardized mortality rates (SMR) for diabetes, acute myocardial infarction (AMI), and hypertension have increased dramatically. As of 2012, diabetes - associated with obesity - was the largest single killer of Mexicans. As of 2016, it was responsible for over 100,000 premature deaths in the country.

Economically, the rising obesity rate in Mexico is also taking a toll on its health care system. According to a study published by Cambridge University Press, cost of treatment for obesity related diseases is projected to grow from an estimated $806 million in 2010 to $1.2 billion in 2030 and $1.7 billion in 2050. Recent efforts have been made by the Mexican government to address the issue of obesity as a reduction of 1% in mean BMI would reduce the cost by $43 million in 2030 and $85 million in 2050 respectively. Through initiatives that focus on the narrative of a healthier lifestyle, the government aims to reduce the projected obesity prevalence. However, not much is known about the effectiveness of those programs.

== Efforts to combat the problem ==
There have been efforts to combat obesity in the country, with the federal government investing about seven percent of its budget to various nutritional programs. Both public and private money has been spent on various campaigns aimed at modern eating habits. Mexico’s government has created nutrition programs, to deal with nutritional issues such as obesity; especially in vulnerable people and low-income sectors. These include food distribution among low-income communities, micronutrient supplementation, and fortification of food. All of this is made to fight the deficiency of vitamins and minerals. Some programs, as the distribution ones, try to achieve the objective by dispensing food coupons on marginalized communities. One of these initiatives is implemented by the Mexican Institute of Social Security (IMSS). This program is known as "Preven-IMSS" (Prevent-IMSS). It integrates nutritional and physical activities as components, to combat diabetes, obesity, and high blood pressure. Another government initiative is with Mexico’s Health Ministry called "Oportunidades" (Opportunities) and "Liconsa". Opportunidades has the aim to support low-income and extremely poor families with health services and food. This is reached by offering nutrition education with which families can develop their capacities to sustenance health and nutrition care.

In 2008, the Mexican Secretariat of Health and PepsiCo launched a health campaign for children. The program is aimed at elementary school-age children and encourages active participation in exercise activities and adopting a healthy lifestyle by using a computer game. In this game, the "nutrin," as the figure is called, needs help making decisions on what foods to eat, what sports to play, and when it should go to the doctor for a check-up.

"Wrestling vs obesity" was a campaign to promote to wrestling (lucha libre) fans to have an active way of life taking advantage of one of the most popular sports of Mexico. This campaign spanned from August 5 to November 19 of 2012 in Mexico City, State of Mexico, Hidalgo, Puebla, Tamaulipas, San Luis Potosí, Guanajuato and Morelos. "El Elegio" (A Mexican wrestler) was the official image for this campaign. He appeared in a pre-fight video talking about obesity and how to avoid it. During these events, both health/nutrition information was distributed along with application forms for government health care.

Voit, a sport brand, with the cooperation of the Mexican Football Federation and the health secretary of Mexico, released a new campaign with the name of "Measure yourself and activate". For this campaign Voit produced a special orange match ball with the name of "Xacte midete 2012" (Measure yourself exactly 2012) for professional football games in Mexico. This new ball is aimed at promoting the sport in children and reducing childhood obesity. Decio de Maria Serrano, the president of the Mexican soccer federation, said: "We are excited with this new campaign. All the people that are involved in this amazing sport have to contribute to combat childhood obesity it is a big responsibility because it is a big problem in this country. (Mexico) It is a task that deserves support".

Congress's lower house of Congress passed a special tax on junk food that is seen as potentially the broadest of its kind, part of an ambitious Mexican government effort to contain runaway rates of obesity and diabetes. The House passed the proposed measure to charge a 5% tax on packaged food that contains 275 calories (1,150 kJ) or more per 100 grams, on grounds that such high-energy items typically contain large amounts of salt and sugar and few essential nutrients. Subsequent studies have indicated that the one peso per liter tax rate has only led to a small reduction in soft drink consumption, and the fall in calorie consumption was described as "nothing compared to the drop in calories people needed to consume in order to not be obese". The effectiveness of the tax on junk food was subject to debate.

== See also ==
- Health in Mexico
- Epidemiology of obesity
- List of countries by Body Mass Index (BMI)
- Food labeling in Mexico
