= Jorge Alcocer Varela =

Mexican healthcare professional

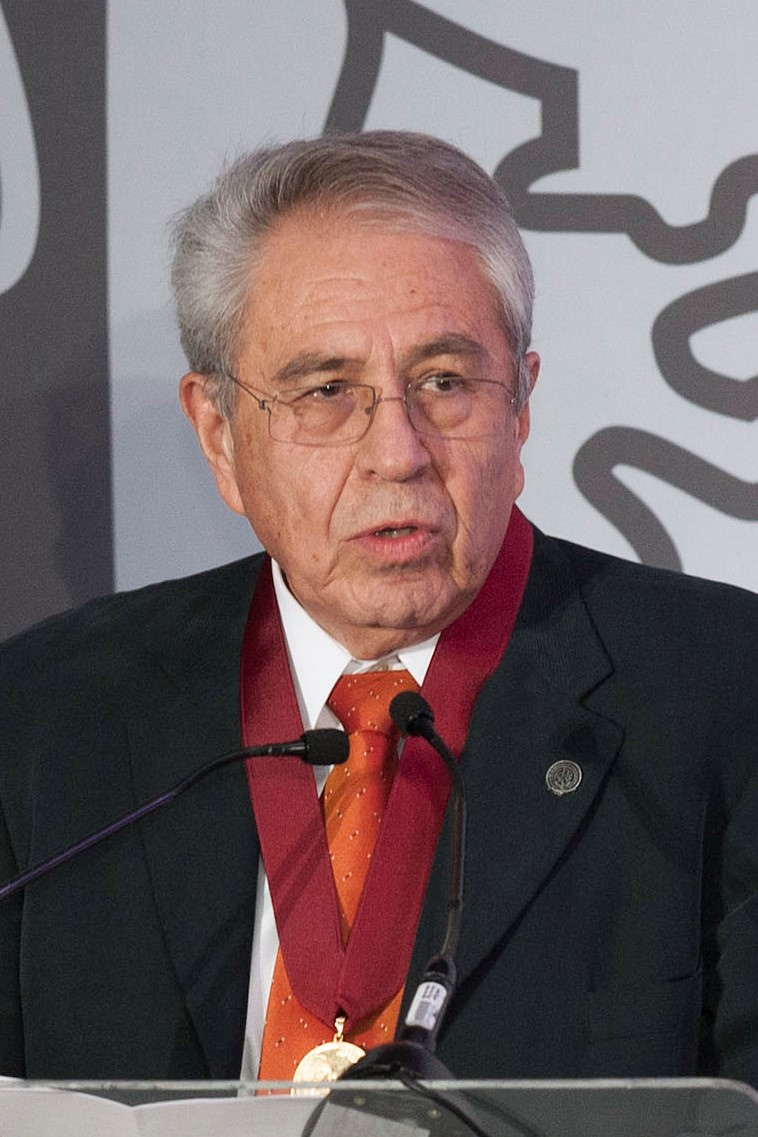

Secretary of Health
- In office 1 December 2018 – 30 September 2024
- President: Andrés Manuel López Obrador
- Preceded by: José Narro Robles
- Succeeded by: David Kershenobich

Personal details
- Born: 8 February 1946 (age 80)
- Education: National Autonomous University of Mexico
- Occupation: Researcher

Jorge Alcocer Varela (born 8 February 1946) is a Mexican immunologist, researcher, teacher and healthcare professional. He has served as the head of Secretariat of Health of Mexico, appointed by President Andrés Manuel López Obrador, from 2018 to 2024. As a physician and emeritus researcher at the Salvador Zubirán National Institute of Health Sciences and Nutrition, Alcocer Varela has served Mexican public health in various capacities for more than 30 years.

== Early life and education ==
In 1970 Alcocer Varela received a degree in Medicine from the National Autonomous University of Mexico (UNAM). He completed his specialty in Internal Medicine, Rheumatology and Clinical Immunology at the Salvador Zubirán National Institute of Health Sciences and Nutrition. In 1980 he obtained a Postgraduate Degree in Immunology from the Cancer Research UK (formerly ICRF) at the University of London, and later in 2007 he obtained the Ph.D. in medical sciences from the UNAM. He has also a Certification in Rheumatology obtained from Mexican Council of Rheumatology, an organisation which was led by Alcocer Varela in 1992.

== Career ==
As a teacher Alcocer Varela was associate professor at Postgraduate course in Rheumatology (1981-1999 and 2000-2004); professor of the specialization course in Rheumatology (2004 to 2016); academic advisor and professor in the Masters Degree and Doctorate program in Medical Sciences from 1994 to date at National Autonomous University of Mexico. He was also Tutors Coordinator for the Immunology Area and the Biochemistry Specialization Program of UNAM Faculty of Chemistry.

As a researcher his main lines are immunopathogenesis of diffuse connective tissue diseases, immune tolerance and autoimmunity and ubiquitins and autoimmunity. He was accepted on National System of Researchers of Mexico (SNI) in 1989. As a peer-reviewer of that system from 1998 to 2000 he was member of the Biomedicine Dictaminating Commission; member of the Academic Council of the Biological Sciences and Health Area, and member of the dictaminating commission of the Institute of Biomedical Investigations from 2002 to 2006. From 1998 to 2000 he was member of the dictaminating commission in Biomedicine of the system and from 2009 to 2012 he was president of the Board of Honor of the SNI. Alcocer Varela reached in 2011 the distinction as National Emeritus Investigator.

== Other activities ==
- Partnership for Maternal, Newborn & Child Health (PMNCH), Member of the Board
