= Federal Commission for the Protection against Sanitary Risk =

Mexican government agency

Agency overview
- Formed: July 5, 2001
- Jurisdiction: Federal government of Mexico
- Agency executive: Alejandro Ernesto Svarch Pérez
- Parent agency: Secretariat of Health
- Website: www.gob.mx/cofepris

The Federal Commission for Protection against Health Risks (in Spanish, Comisión Federal para la Protección contra Riesgos Sanitarios, Cofepris) is a regulatory body of the Mexican government. It is a decentralized organ of (and supervised by) the Mexican Secretariat of Health, and is responsible for regulating a variety of health related topics in Mexico, including food safety, pharmaceutical drugs, medical devices, organ transplants, and environmental protection.

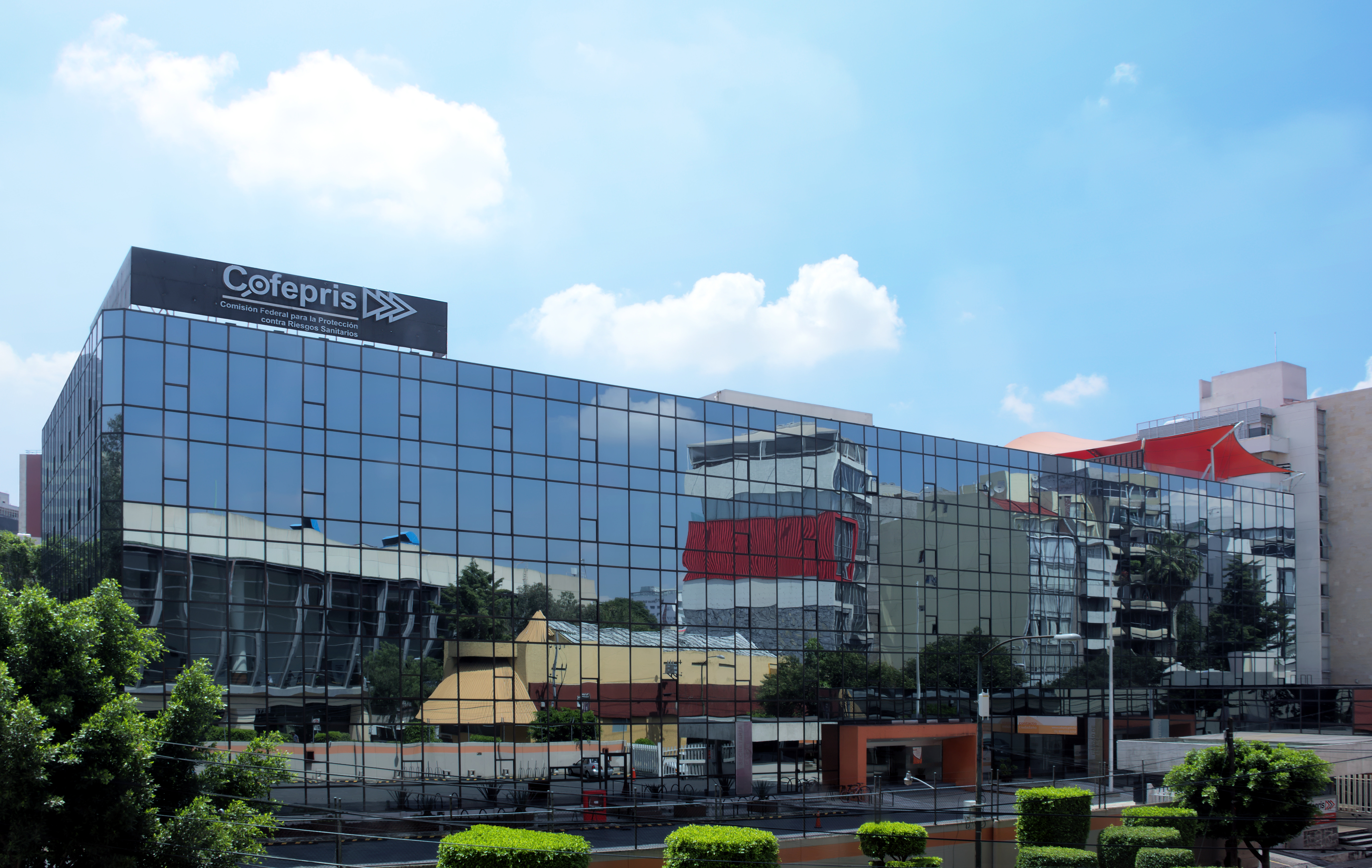
COFEPRIS headquarters in Mexico City

== See also ==
- Food and Drug Administration (Similar organization in the United States)
- Health Canada (Similar organization in Canada)
