= José Narro Robles =

Mexican politician

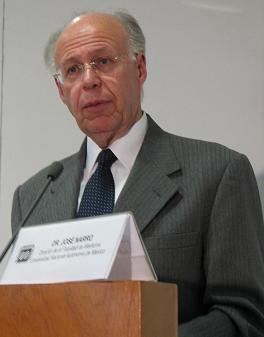

Secretary of Health
- In office 8 February 2016 – 30 November 2018
- President: Enrique Peña Nieto
- Preceded by: Mercedes Juan López
- Succeeded by: Jorge Alcocer Varela

Rector of the National Autonomous University of Mexico
- In office 17 November 2007 – 16 November 2015
- Preceded by: Juan Ramón de la Fuente
- Succeeded by: Enrique Graue Wiechers

Personal details
- Born: December 5, 1948 (age 77) Saltillo, Coahuila, Mexico
- Party: Independent (since 2019)
- Other political affiliations: Institutional Revolutionary Party (1973-2019)
- Education: National Autonomous University of Mexico (MD); University of Birmingham (MPH)
- Known for: Rector of the National Autonomous University of Mexico

José Narro Robles (born December 5, 1948) is a Mexican physician, researcher, academic and politician. He is a former director of the Faculty of Medicine of the National Autonomous University of Mexico (UNAM) and was elected its 23rd Rector on November 20, 2007. After two 4-year periods leading UNAM, in February 2016, he was appointed by Mexican President Enrique Peña Nieto to replace Mercedes Juan as head of the Mexican Secretariat of Health.

Robles has enacted as adviser for the World Health Organization, WHO and UNICEF. He has been president of the National Academy of Medicine, of which he has been a member since 1992. He has also worked as General Director of Health Services of the Mexican Federal District, Secretary-General of the Mexican Institute of Social Security (IMSS), Undersecretary of Migratory Services and Population at the Ministry of the Interior (Secretaría de Gobernación) and Undersecretary of Health at the Federal Secretariat of Health. He holds a number of honorary doctorates from Latin American and European universities.

== Honorary doctorates ==
- University of Birmingham, United Kingdom (2012)
- University of Santiago, Chile (2017)
- Universidad de la Habana, Cuba (2016)
- Universidad Juárez Autónoma de Tabasco (2011)
- Universidad de Salamanca, Spain (2016)
- Universidad Autónoma de Campeche, Mexico (2015)
- Benemérita Universidad Autónoma de Puebla, Mexico (2013)
- Universidad Autónoma de Sinaloa, Mexico (2015)
- Universidad Autónoma de San Luis Potosí, Mexico 2015
- Universidad Autónoma de Nuevo León, Mexico (2016)
