= Instituto de Salud para el Bienestar =

Mexican government healthcare agency

Logo

The Institute of Health for Welfare (Spanish: Instituto de Salud para el Bienestar, INSABI) was a government agency of Mexico that provided medical services to those people who were not covered by the Mexican Social Security Institute (IMSS) or the Institute for Social Security and Services for State Workers (ISSSTE). It was established in 2020 and replaced Seguro Popular, the previous health insurance scheme which had been created in 2003. The director of INSABI was Juan Antonio Ferrer Aguilar. On April 25, 2023, the Chamber of Deputies approved its dissolution with 267 votes in favor, 222 against, and 1 abstention due to numerous supply and logistical issues in the health sector. As a result, the INSABI merged into the IMSS-Bienestar, which took its responsibilities.
