= Institute for Social Security and Services for State Workers =

Mexican public health system

- ISSSTE Logo

Agency overview
- Formed: 1959
- Jurisdiction: Federal government of Mexico
- Headquarters: Plaza de la República No 148, Col. Tabacalera, México City
- Agency executive: Martí Batres, General Director
- Parent agency: Secretariat of Health
- Website: www.issste.gob.mx/

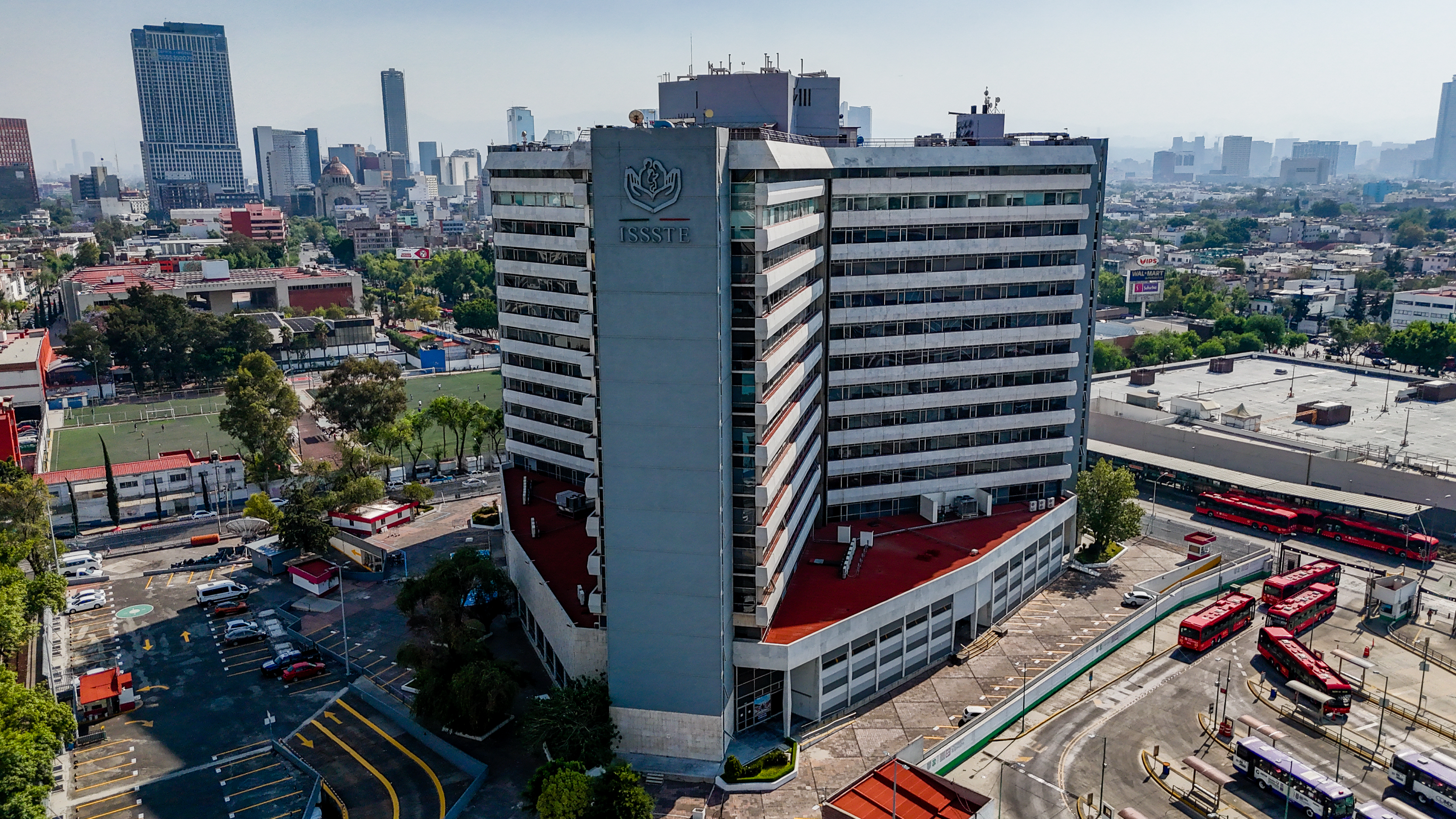
Central offices of ISSSTE in Mexico City.

The Institute for Social Security and Services for State Workers or Civil Service Social Security and Services Institute (Spanish: Instituto de Seguridad y Servicios Sociales de los Trabajadores del Estado, ISSSTE) is a federal agency in Mexico that administers part of Mexico's health care and social security systems for federal government workers.

Unlike the Mexican Social Security Institute (or IMSS), which covers workers in the private sector, the ISSSTE is charged with providing benefits for federal government workers only. The ISSSTE provides assistance in cases of disability, old age, early retirement, and death (or IVCM, for invalidez, vejez, cesantía en edad avanzada, y muerte) to federal workers. Together with the IMSS, the ISSSTE provides health coverage for between 55 and 60 percent of the population of Mexico.

== History and responsibilities ==
ISSSTE was founded on December 30, 1959 by president Adolfo López Mateos.

In addition to ISSSTE, which is exclusive for employees of the federal government, states in Mexico have their own separate health and retirement system for government workers within its own state. For example, the state of Tabasco offers its employees retirement, health, and other similar benefits through an agency called Instituto de Seguridad Social del Estado de Tabasco, or "ISSET".

In September 2020, former director of FOVISSSTE José Reyes Baeza Terrazas was accused of embezzling MXN $129 million (US $6.14 million) as part of the estafa maestra ("master scam") scandal.

== Criticism ==
Like much of Mexico's health care system, the ISSSTE has been the subject of numerous criticisms and allegations, ranging from corruption to a heavy regional bias in favor of major cities with well organized labor unions.

== See also ==
- Secretariat of Health (Mexico)
- Mexican Social Security Institute
