= Salvador Zubirán National Institute of Health Sciences and Nutrition =

Medical research institute in Mexico City, Mexico

Coordinates: 19.2896°N 99.1566°W

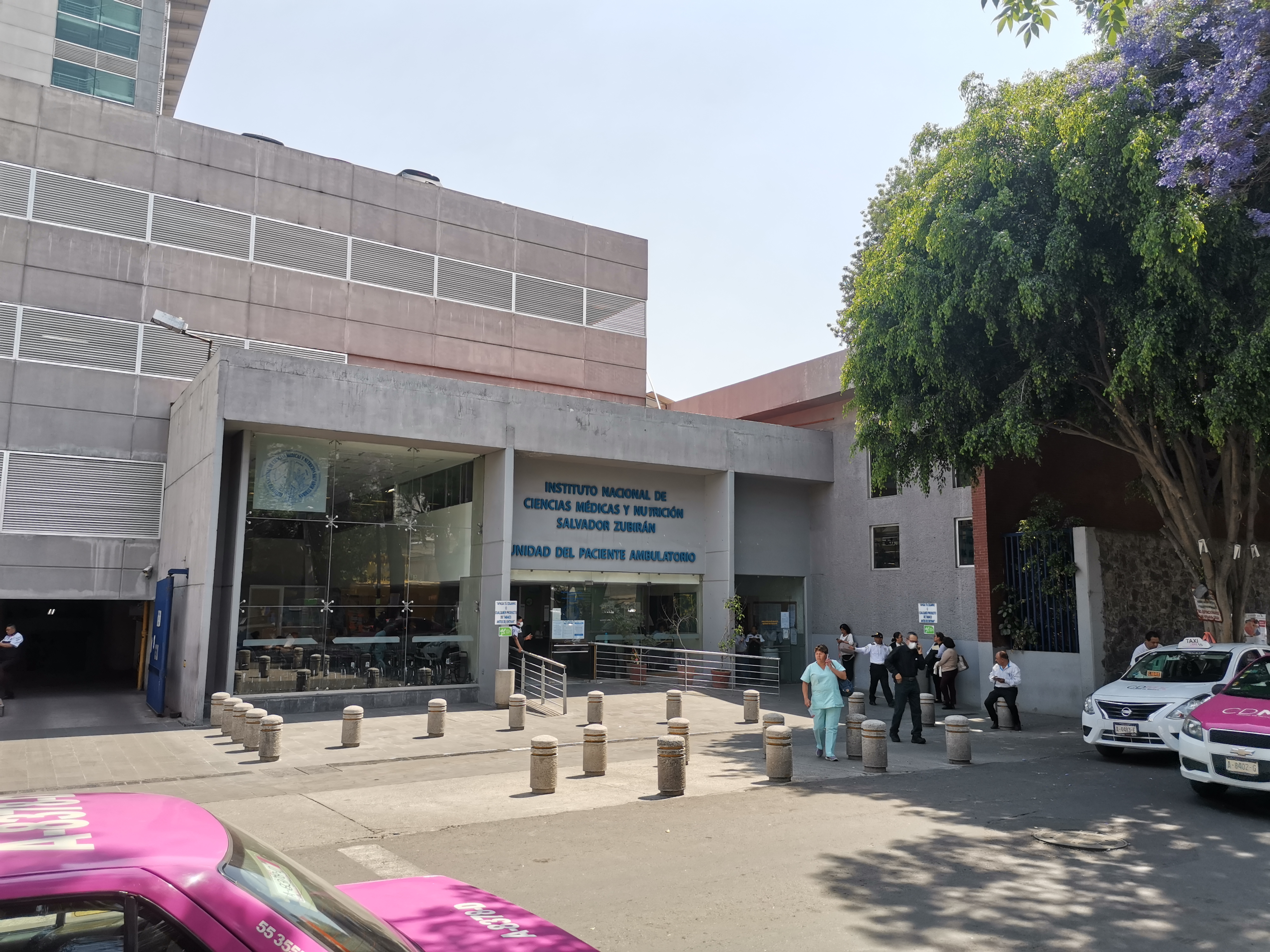
Out-patient access

The Salvador Zubirán National Institute of Health Sciences and Nutrition (Spanish: Instituto Nacional de Ciencias Médicas y Nutrición Salvador Zubirán, INCMNSZ) is one of the twelve national institutes that belong to the Mexican Secretariat of Health. Its main functions and services include medical research, specialized medical attention and health education for future professionals. It is located in the Tlalpan borough in the south of Mexico City where the main hospitals in the city are located. David Kershenobich Stalnikowitz currently manages the institute.

== Institution ==
The main priorities of the institute are high quality research, creating medical knowledge and specialized medical assistance. It was founded to address concerns about nutrition and illnesses resulting in poor nutrition in Mexico, as they are considered to inhibit the growth and development of the country.

== History ==
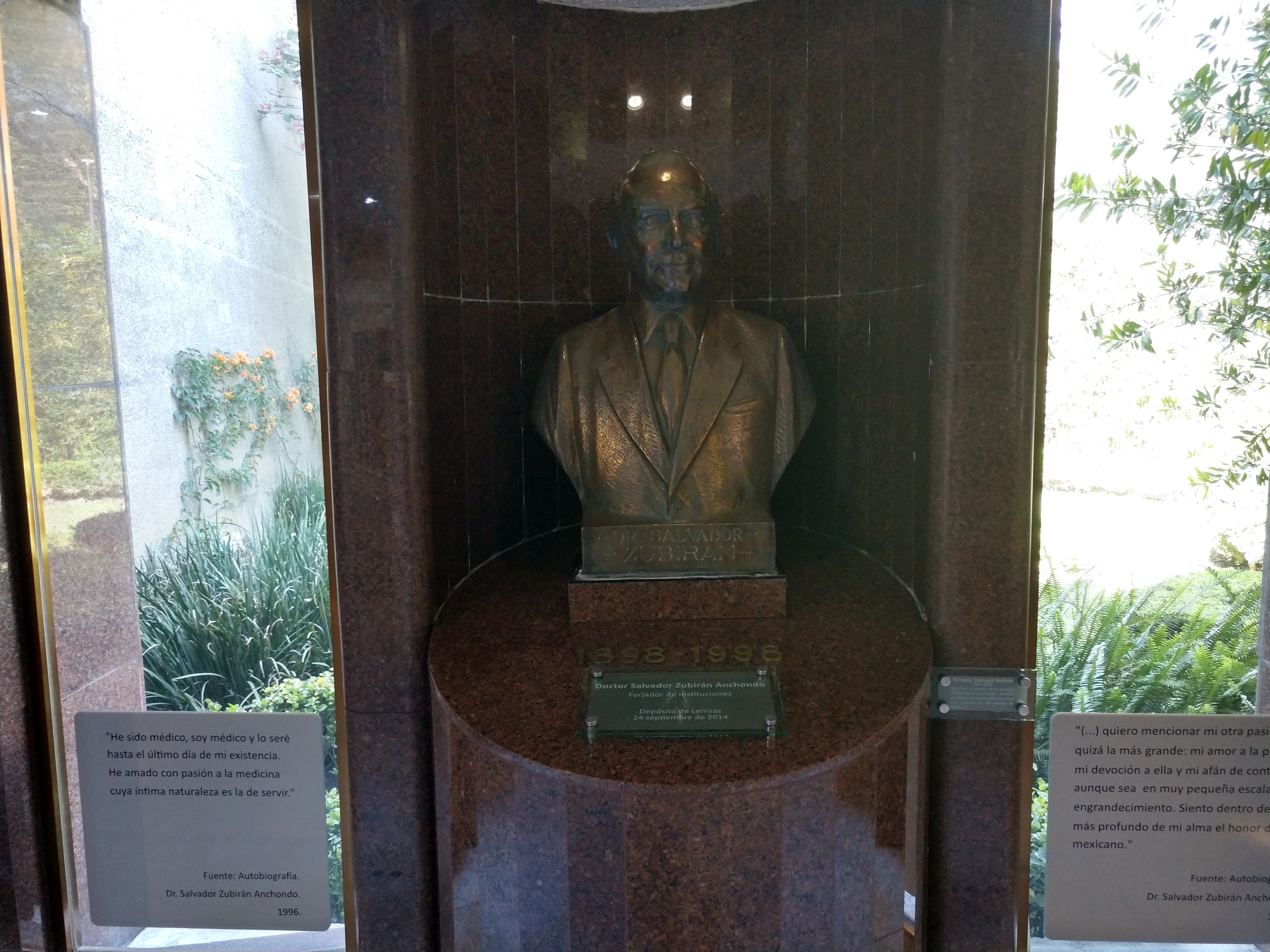
Facilities of the Salvador Zubirán National Institute of Medical Sciences and Nutrition, Mexico City

The institute began as an initiative of Dr. Salvador Zubirán in 1944, who created a small hospital unit at the General Hospital in Mexico City specializing in metabolic and nutritional disorders called the Nutrition Disease Service. In 1945, the project was reorganized and separated into its own facility. Shortly after, the hospital began receiving financial support from the Secretariat of Health. The name for the new hospital was Nutrition Disease Hospital and attended clinical problems related with and metabolism. However, the hospital did not officially open until October 12, 1946, due to the lack of available space to build the treatment and research facilities. The hospital opened with specializations including endocrinology, gastroenterology and hematology. In 1948, researchers from the facility began publishing results of studies in national and international journals.

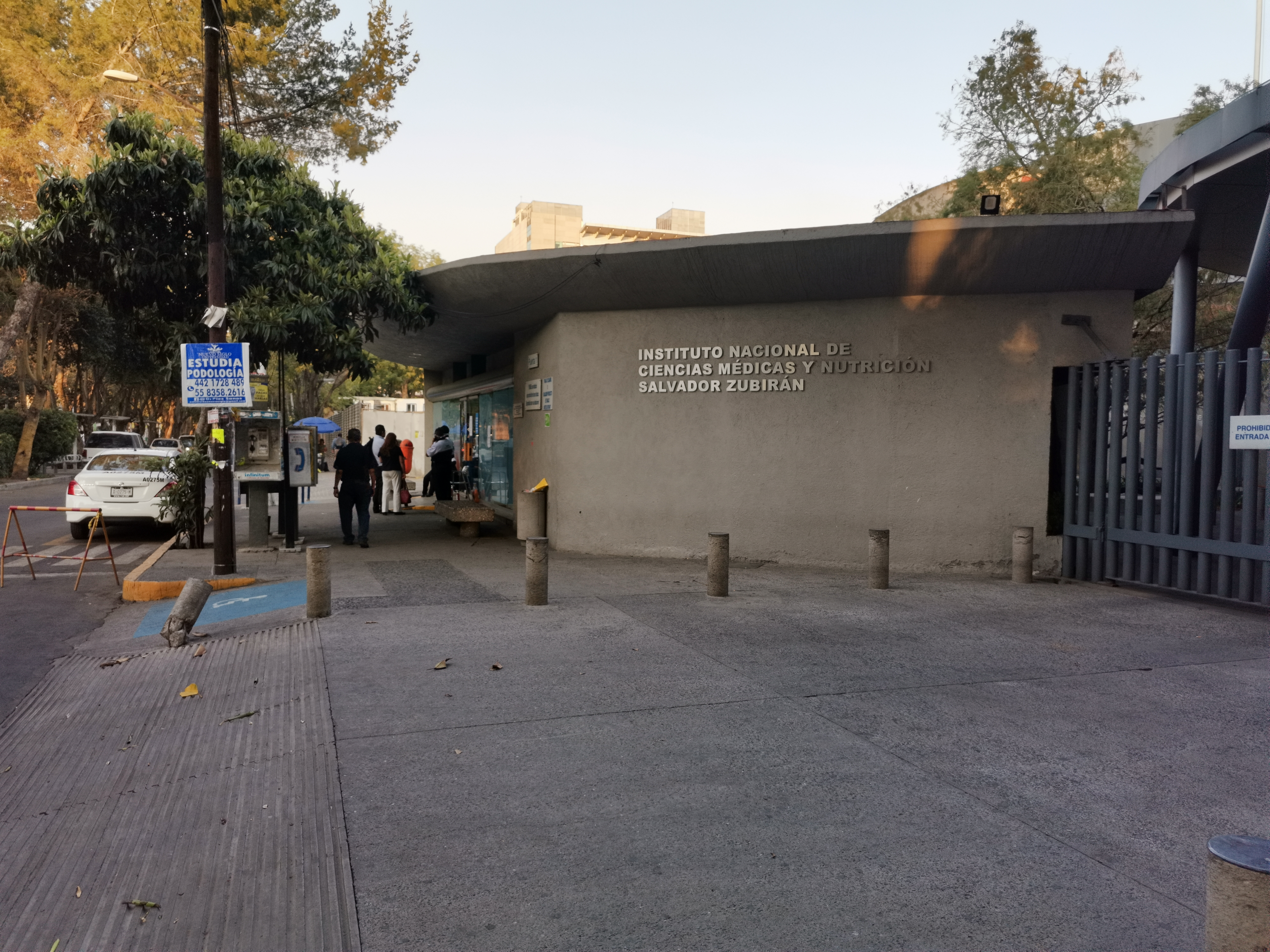
People entering a special respiratory illness symptom assessment area at the Instituto Nacional de Ciencias Médicas y Nutrición Salvador Zubirán. The hospital was converted into a special care area for the 2020 COVID-19 pandemic patients.

In 1970, the hospital moved from the center to its present location in the south of the city, expanding services and specialties. In 1987, the facility was reorganized to become of the twelve main institutes of the Secretariat of Health and its name was changed to the National Nutrition Health Institute. In 1988, the words "Salvador Zubirán" were added to the name to commemorate the doctor who founded the original institution as well as to honor his general contributions to medical knowledge about diabetes and nutrition.

Since 1993, the institute has published its own journal on the medical sciences and clinical research called Scielo. It is published six times per year.

On May 26, 2000, the name was changed one more time to the current one, the Salvador Zubirán National Institute of Health Sciences and Nutrition. This decision was made by the Secretariat of Health to more closely reflect the work done at the institute.

Today, about one thousand people study and work at the institute. These include students from the Escuela Nacional de Enfermería y Obstetricia (the national nursing school) and medical students studying on one of the 50 medical specialties taught. These specialties include laboratory analysis, surgery, and clinical-surgical specialties. This Institute has most researchers and the most scientific production in Mexico. At least 150 health professionals working on the Institute are specialized on medical research. As of 2010, 127 members of these were affiliated with the National Research Mexican System. From 2007 to 2009, 1994 scientific articles on medical journals were published by health professionals and researchers working on the National Institute of Medical Health Sciences and Nutrition. Medical scientific research continues, but the topics change depending on the needs of the population. Current medical research is specialized in diabetes, obesity and other nutritional disorders.

== Recognition and accomplishments ==
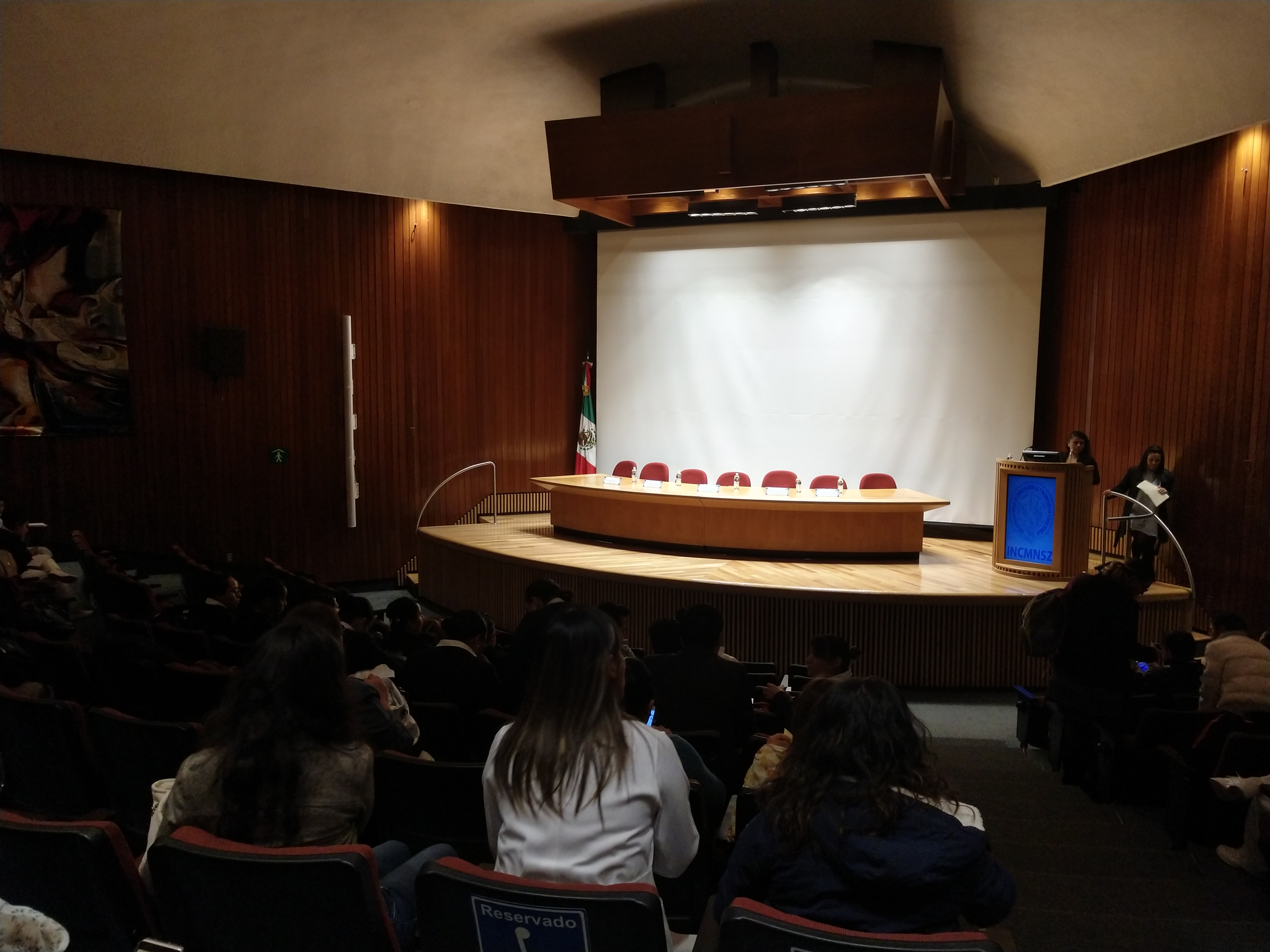
Institute auditorium

The International Journal of Cuban Health and Medicine has named the institute the most specialized teaching hospital in Latin America.

Physicians who worked at the institute have obtained eight National Science Awards.

In May 2012, an arm transplant was performed at the institute, the 1st in Mexico and Latin America. Only 21 surgeries like these have been done in the globe, this was the 22nd. The surgery was performed in 17 hours with 19 nurses and doctors. Patient Gabriel Granados received two arms which have almost the same physical attributes as the originals. The patient can realize 80% of all the activities he used to do before, with a prognosis of returning to 90%.
