= Secretariat of Health =

Government health ministry in Mexico

- Secretaría de Salud
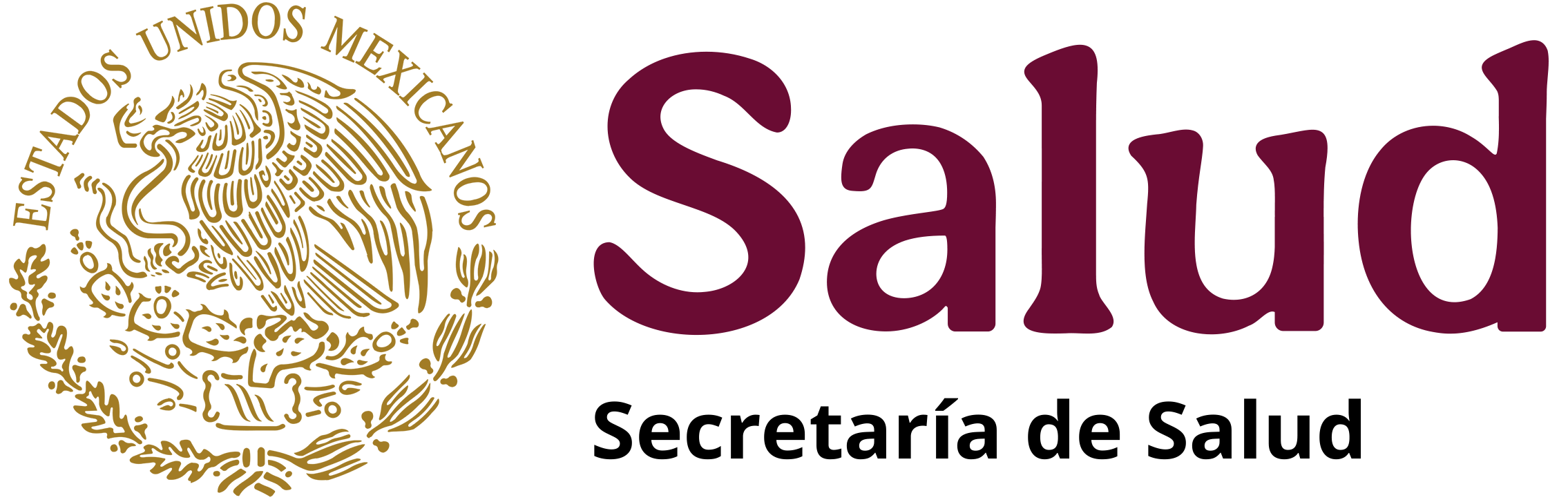
- SALUD

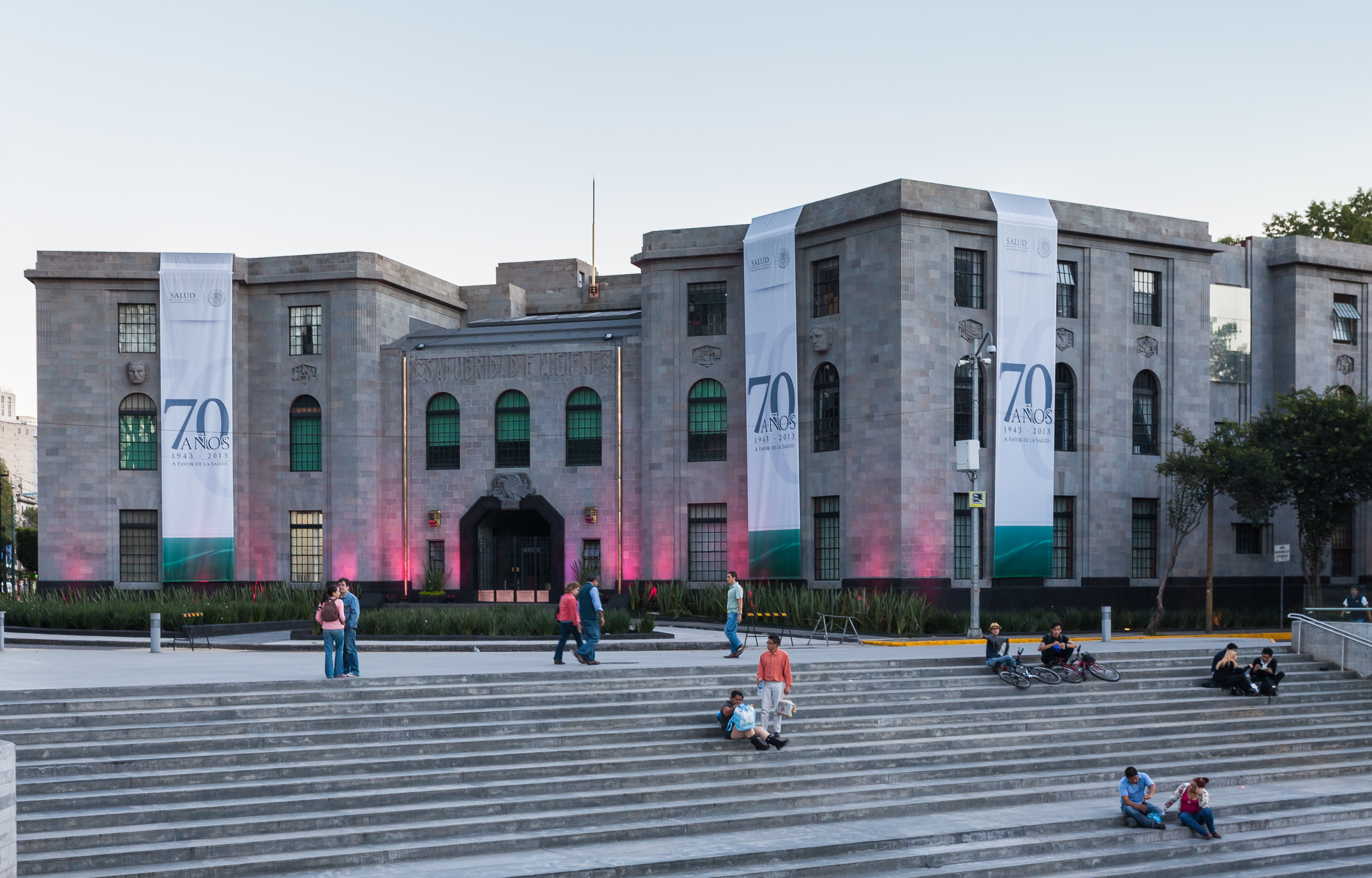
- Old Secretary of Health headquarters in Mexico City

Agency overview
- Formed: December 1938; 87 years ago
- Type: Secretary of State
- Jurisdiction: Federal government of Mexico
- Headquarters: Acapulco; 19°25′19″N 99°10′32″W
- Agency executive: David Kershenobich Stalnikowitz, Secretary
- Child agencies: Institute of Health for Welfare; Mexican Social Security Institute; Federal Commission for the Protection against Sanitary Risk; Institute for Social Security and Services for State Workers
- Website: salud.gob.mx

The Secretariat of Health (Spanish: Secretaría de Salud) is the government department in charge of all social health services in Mexico, and an integral part of the Mexican health system. The Secretary of Health is a member of the Executive Cabinet and is appointed at the discretion of the President of the Republic.

In recent years, the federal Secretariat of Health has played a more restricted role, as many of its functions have been transferred to the corresponding institutions of the individual states.

== List of recent secretaries of health ==
Name	Start	End	President
David Kershenobich	2024	present	Claudia Sheinbaum
Jorge Alcocer Varela	2018	2024	Andrés Manuel López Obrador
José Narro Robles	2016	2018	Enrique Peña Nieto
Mercedes Juan López	2012	2016	Enrique Peña Nieto
Salomón Chertorivski Woldenberg	2012	2012	Felipe Calderón
José Ángel Córdova Villalobos	2006	2012	Felipe Calderón
Julio Frenk	2000	2006	Vicente Fox Quezada
José Antonio González Fernández	1999	2000	Ernesto Zedillo
Juan Ramón de la Fuente	1994	1999	Ernesto Zedillo
Jesús Kumate Rodríguez	1988	1994	Carlos Salinas de Gortari
Guillermo Soberón Acevedo	1982	1988	Miguel de la Madrid

== See also ==
- Salvador Zubirán National Institute of Health Sciences and Nutrition
