= Brain health and pollution =

Effects of pollution on the brain

External videos
- How Does Air Pollution Affect Brain Health?, Society for Neuroscience, July 1, 2025
- "How air pollution impacts our brains", Harvard T.H. Chan School of Public Health, Feb 27, 2024.

The effects of pollution on the brain are felt throughout the lifespan. Prenatal exposure to pollution is associated with an increased risk of negative fetal outcomes, including central nervous system damage and developmental delays. Exposure to pollution can lead to neurodevelopmental disorders involving brain development, cognitive function, intellectual development, and emotional and behavioral regulation, often becoming apparent during childhood or adolescence (e.g. ADHD, autism). Pollution is also linked to mental health outcomes that are commonly diagnosed in adolescence or adulthood such as schizophrenia, neuroticism, depression, anxiety, and suicide. Pollution is associated with neurological conditions such as migraines and stroke, cognitive impairment, and neurodegenerative disorders such as multiple sclerosis, Alzheimer's disease, Parkinson's disease, and dementia.

The criteria air pollutants particulate matter, nitrogen dioxide, sulfur dioxide, carbon monoxide, ozone, and lead have been identified as harmful to human health by the World Health Organization and the U.S. Environmental Protection Agency (EPA). Many of them are linked to the burning of fossil fuels, through vehicle use, heating and cooking. Indoor and outdoor air pollution can contain particulate matter, dioxins, heavy metals, and endocrine-disrupting chemicals and microplastics that have negative effects on the central nervous system (CNS). Increased exposures to pollutants such as particulate matter and black carbon are associated with increases in cognitive impairment. Pollutants can interfere with neuroplasticity (the brain's ability to grow new neurons, adapt, and reorganize itself) and lead to long-term structural changes. Neurotoxicity is mediated by processes such as oxidative stress, mitochondrial dysfunction, and neuroinflammation. Pollutants such as microplastics may affect the neurophysiology of individuals after the structure of the CNS has mostly stabilized.

In terms of long-term social and economic impacts, air pollution exposure is linked to poorer cognitive development, academic performance and learning capacity in children. In adults, the effects of air pollution are linked to lower incomes, and decreased personal and workplace productivity. Economically, lowered IQ levels (as a measure of cognitive ability) are also related to increased healthcare costs and greater burden on the health system.

As a contributor to disease burden, environmental pollution is potentially preventable. Steps can be taken to minimize exposures to pollutants such as avoiding smoking, minimizing dust, using glass instead of plastics, carefully selecting cleaning products and cosmetics, and exercising away from heavy traffic routes. Control strategies can also be implemented to improve industrial safety and public health.

== Pollutants ==
Pollutants can be inhaled, eaten, drunk, or absorbed through skin, with inhalation of air pollution being a dominant exposure route. Air pollution can result both from natural causes such as sea spray or desert dust and from human activities such as first and second-hand tobacco and cannabis smoke, household air pollution (HAP), and automobile exhaust fumes from fossil fuel combustion. Air pollution is a complex mixture that includes solids, liquids and gases. Air pollution also contains combinations of tiny particles of solid or liquid matter suspended in air, called particulate matter.

Research into the possible effects of air pollutants on the brain dates to 2002, when Lilian Calderón-Garcidueñas and her colleagues published the first in a series of pioneering studies that linked air pollution to harmful effects on brain health, beginning in childhood. They went on to examine the association of high levels of air pollution with a wide variety of molecular, structural, and cognitive brain outcomes in dogs, children and young adults. They found that dogs and children exposed to air pollution in Mexico City showed neuropathological changes of the type associated with Alzheimer's disease.

Since then, two decades of research have firmly established that air pollutation has neurotoxic effects on the human brain across the lifespan. In 2022, the UK's Committee on the Medical Effects of Air Pollutants (COMEAP) reviewed nearly 70 epidemiological studies (in human populations) on dementia and cognitive decline. They concluded that long-term exposure to ambient air pollution was consistently associated with declines in cognitive function, particularly those involving memory and executive function. The results of animal, in vitro, and human studies show converging evidence regarding the biological mechanisms by which air pollution may affect the brain. Air pollution is consistently associated with neurostructural and neurofunctional changes such as increased inflammation and oxidative stress, disruption of the blood-brain barrier, and altered activity of neurotransmitters, neuromodulators and their metabolites. Exposure to air pollution may also be associated with changes to gray matter volume and white matter structure within some brain regions.

Air pollutants can affect the brain at all developmental stages, causing direct and indirect damage through oxidative stress, inflammation, mitochondrial dysfunction, altered myelination and alterations in normal cell signaling.

=== Particulate matter ===
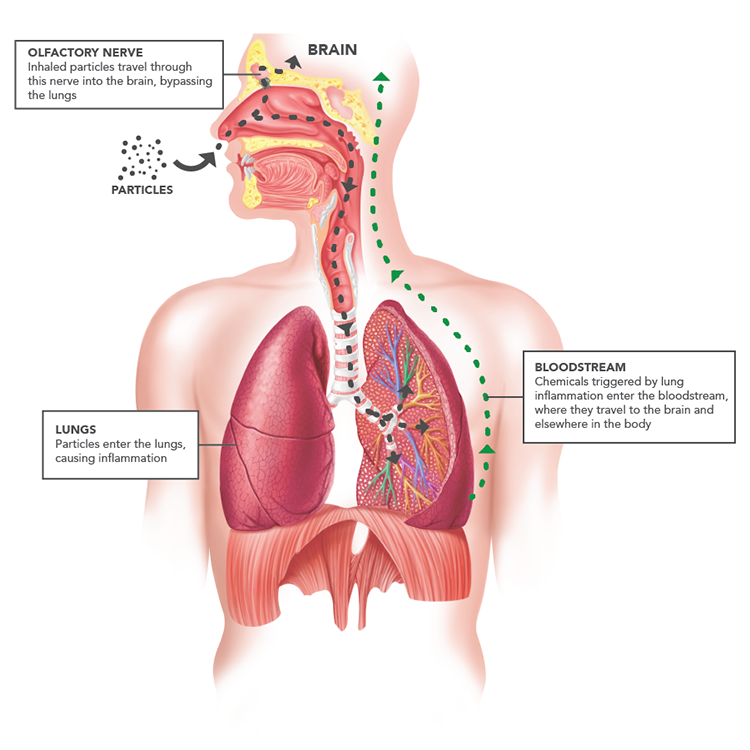
Particulates travel through the lungs, bloodstream and olfactory nerve.

Particulate matter is made up of tiny particles of solid or liquid matter suspended in air, which are referred to in terms of the size of the particles measured (e.g. PM_{10}, PM_{2.5}, PM_{1}, ultrafine particles). PM_{2.5} contains particulates with a diameter of 2.5 micrometers or less. Small particulates are extremely harmful as they can penetrate deep into the lungs and travel through the bloodstream to the brain. Particulate matter can contain many toxic components, including carbon and heavy metals, with its chemical composition influencing its effects. As of 2022, the World Health Organization reported that 99% of the world’s population lives in places with unhealthy levels of PM_{2.5} pollution. Increased exposures to pollutants such as particulate matter (PM_{10}, PM_{2.5}, PM_{1}) and black carbon are associated with increases in cognitive impairment and neurodegenerative diseases such as dementia, Alzheimer's disease and Parkinson's disease. Airborne particulate matter is a Group 1 carcinogen. There is no safe level of particulate exposure.

Outdoor air pollution exposure

Particulate matter can be both manufactured and naturally occurring. Hot volcanic lava, ocean spray, and wildfire smoke are common natural sources of particulates. Aerosols can be intentionally fabricated to serve a vast range of applications in both medicine and technology. Other particulates are produced as byproducts of specific processes or combustion reactions, such as printer toner and automobile exhaust. Anthropogenic sources of particulate matter include combustion of gas, coal, and other hydrocarbons (fossil fuels); burning of biomass fuels (firewood, charcoal, agricultural crop residues, and animal dung) in kitchens, domestic wood stoves, and outdoors; cigarette and cannabis smoking; human-caused forest fires and agricultural burns; waste disposal; industrial emissions; vehicular traffic and wear to roads, tires, and brakes; air traffic; seaport and maritime transportation; construction, demolition, restoration and concrete processing.

Use of power tools and hand tools for demolition, renovation and construction can produce large amounts of dust particulates. High energy tools (cut-off saws, grinders, wall chasers and grit blasters) can produce lots of dust in a short time. Using power tools to cut, grind, drill or prepare a surface, and sanding taped plaster board joints, can produce high dust levels. The more enclosed a work area, the more dust will collect there. The longer one works, the more dust there will be. Work methods such as dry sweeping raise more dust than vacuuming or wet brushing. Knowing that dust is generated during construction and can cause serious health hazards, some manufacturers market power tools equipped with dust collection systems or integrated water delivery systems. However, there are few industry standards for production of dust from tools. As of Q1 2024, California banned the sale of new gas-powered landscaping and outdoor equipment <25 horsepower.

Construction dust generated by power tools and heavy equipments

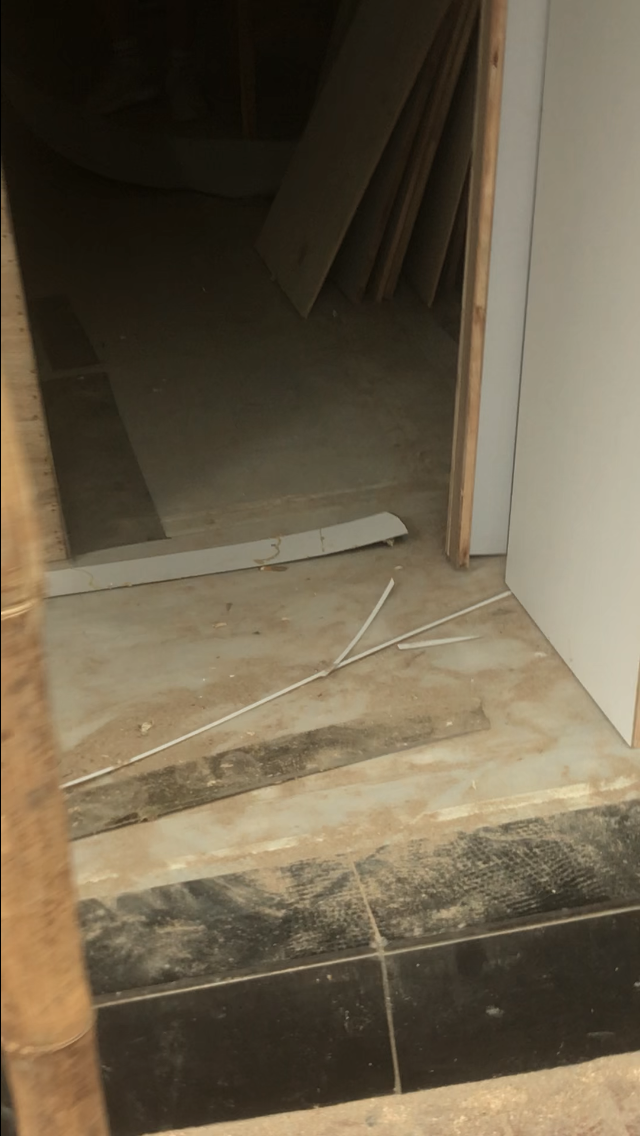

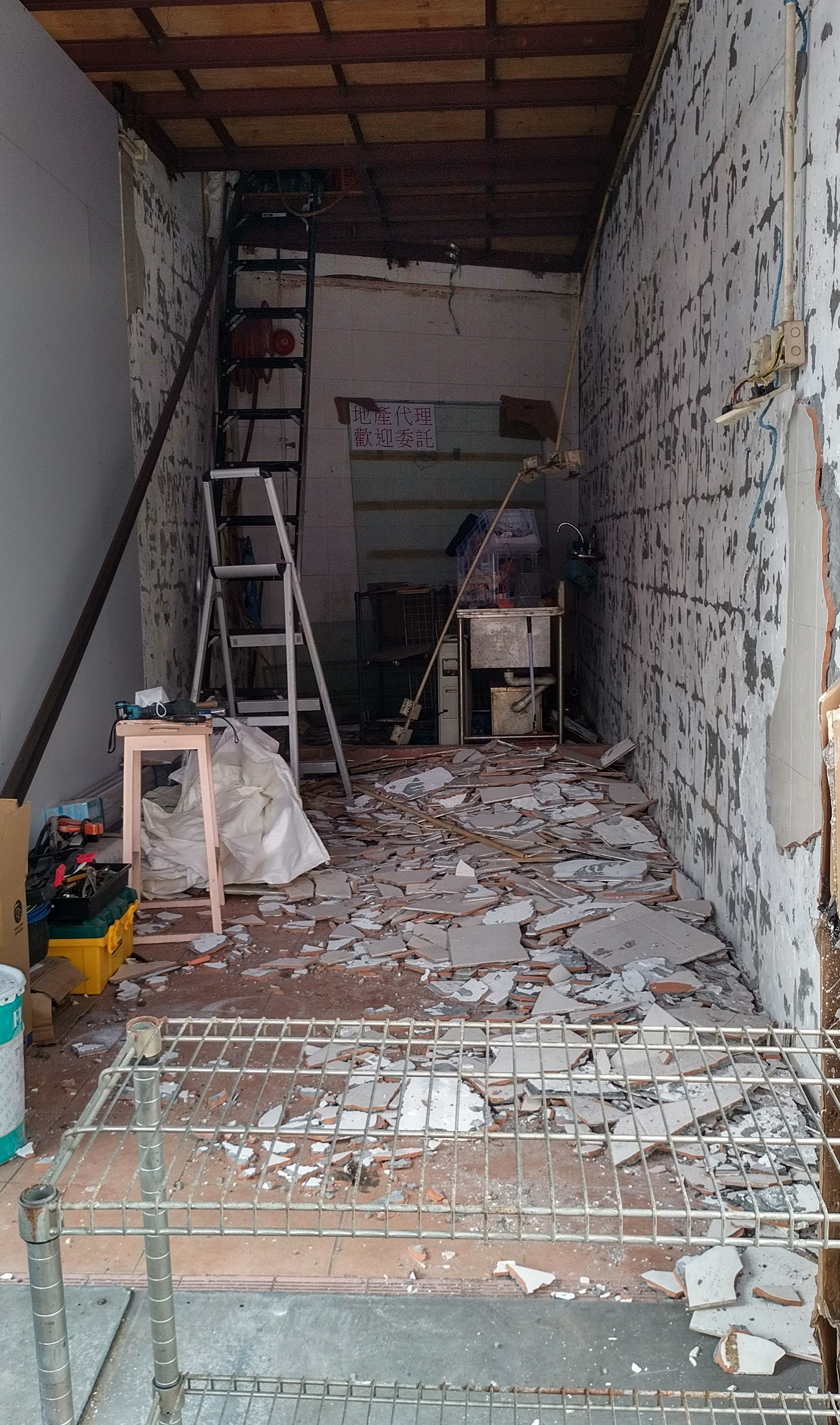

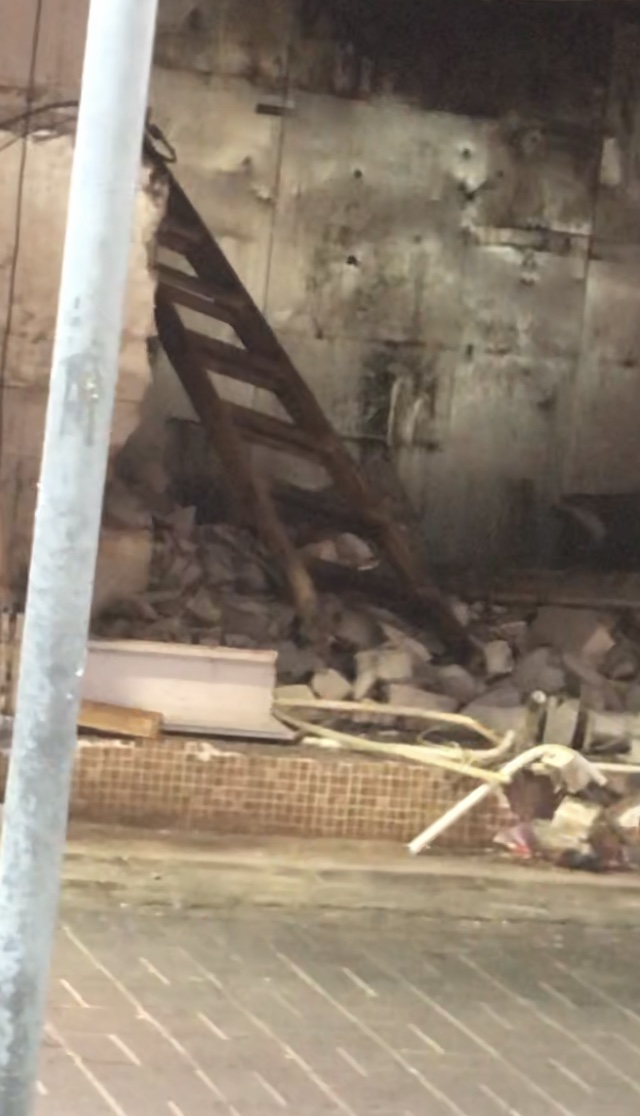

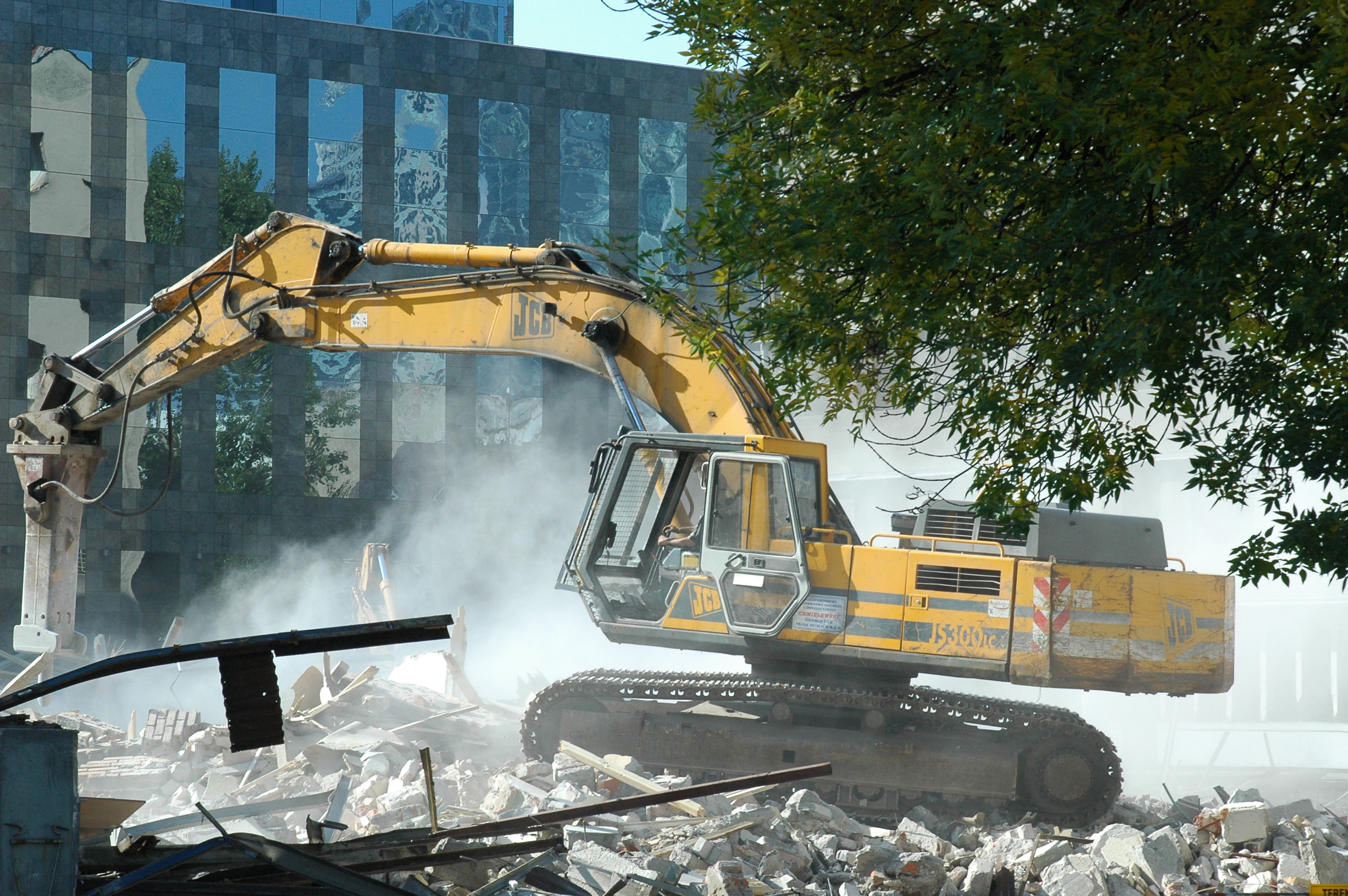

Pollutants such as particulate matter are theorized to affect the brain via multiple pathways. The small particles found in PM_{2.5} can reach the brain through different entry routes via the olfactory system, lungs, circulatory system, and digestive system. PM_{2.5} can enter the nervous system through the nose and olfactory bulb. Inhaled PM_{2.5} can lead to respiratory inflammation and trigger systematic inflammation. This produces proinflammatory cytokines that can disrupt the blood–brain barrier, enabling pollutants to enter the brain. Once PM_{2.5}5 enters the circulatory system, it can be transported to the brain and across the blood–brain barrier. Within the brain, PM_{2.5} interferes with cellular and molecular mechanisms and can injure neurons. Neuroinflammation involves the activation of microglial cells and the production and release of inflammatory cascade mediators, including reactive oxygen species (ROS), proinflammatory cytokines, and nitric oxide. Elevated levels of ROS can interfere with the body’s ability to detoxify cells and to repair cellular damage, resulting in oxidative stress. This can damage cellular components such as DNA, proteins, and lipids. Responses to oxidative stress can lead to changes in mitochondria or other organelles within the cell, like the endoplasmic reticulum (ER), and trigger cell death. A buildup of misfolded proteins in the brain can contribute to cognitive decline and neurodegenerative diseases.

=== Nitrogen oxides (NO_{x}) ===
Nitrogen and oxygen combine during combustion to produce nitrogen oxides (NO_{x}) such as nitric oxide (NO) and nitrogen dioxide (NO_{2}). NO_{2} is generated by fuel burning in vehicles, power plants, and industrial facilities, and is often used as an indicator of the presence of NO_{x} generally and of traffic-related air pollution (TRAP). NO_{2} concentration tends to be highest in urban areas but nitrogen oxides can also be produced through agriculture. NO_{2} reacts with other pollutants and can dissipate quickly, varying hour by hour and from one neighborhood to another. When sunlight reacts with NO_{x} and volatile organic compounds (VOCs) this can produce the pollutant ground level ozone (O_{3}).

NO_{2} can increase oxidative stress and inflammation in the brain, resulting in neuronal damage. Meta-analysis suggests that NO_{2} is also related to depression, possibly due to an increase in reactive oxygen species, oxidative stress and inflammation. Prolonged exposure can interfere with the generation of new neurons and the brain's ability to adapt, and lead to structural changes. Long-term exposure to NO_{2} is associated with lower gray and white matter volume and enlargement of ventricles (fluid-filled spaces) in the brain. This has been linked to accelerated biological aging, reduced cognitive abilities, cognitive decline, increased susceptibility to depression, and higher risk of dementia. NO_{2} may also be linked to Alzheimer's Disease and Parkinson's Disease.

=== Sulfur dioxide (SO_{2}) ===
SO_{2} is a widespread air pollutant, emitted from natural sources such as volcanoes, hot springs, geysers, wildfires, and marine processes, and through human activities such as fossil fuel combustion, manufacturing, and wine preservation. Both acute and chronic exposure to SO_{2} are known to cause respiratory and cardiovascular illnesses and fatalities. Chronic exposure to SO_{2} also appears to cause neurological damage, through mechanisms such as oxidative stress, neuroinflammation, and vascular compromise. SO_{2} exposure can damage synapses and affect the expression of synaptic structural and functional proteins.

Meta-analysis and reviews indicate that exposure to SO_{2} is associated with decreases in global cognitive function, and with increased risk of cognitive decline and cognitive impairment. Cognitive function includes a broad range of skills such as attention, perception, memory, learning, and executive function. Cognitive impairment can include difficulty in thinking, learning, remembering, judgement and decision-making. SO_{2} is linked to memory impairment in aging. Synaptic alterations are considered an early marker for cognitive decline and are correlated with neurodegenerative processes in Alzheimer's and other neurodegenerative diseases. SO_{2} has a potential role in the onset of epileptic seizures and in relapses from schizophrenia.

=== Carbon monoxide (CO) ===
Carbon monoxide (CO) is most commonly associated with acute carbon monoxide poisoning, in which hemoglobin in the blood bonds to CO instead of oxygen, preventing the body from getting enough oxygen to function. Exposure to CO most commonly occurs as a result of incomplete combustion of carbon-based fuels, from engine exhaust, fires, or gasoline-powered tools.

CO exposure is also associated with permanent brain damage which can occur days and weeks after exposure, and involve long-term neurological and cognitive deficits, PTSD, and depression. Mechanisms involved are not well understood, but may involve reactive oxygen species (ROS), oxidative damage, inflammation, and changes to myelin basic protein (MBP) that trigger immune responses and lead to brain damage. Meta-analysis also suggests that exposure to CO is associated with Parkinson's disease.

=== Heavy metals ===
Exposure to heavy metals has been linked to an increased risk of various neurological diseases. Heavy metals can be a component in particulate matter. Among the most neurotoxic heavy metals are lead (Pb), mercury (Hg), and cadmium (Cd). The difficulty of getting good measurements of exposure is an issue in studies of heavy metals. Heavy metals tend to remain in the body, but different metals may be stored in different tissues. Measures from urine, feces and blood are often short-lived indicators of current exposure; hair, fingernails and toenails may reflect somewhat longer periods of exposure, and bones and teeth may indicate exposures over months or years. The effectiveness of a marker varies depending on the metal involved.

==== Lead (Pb) ====
Lead (Pb) has a long history of known toxicity. In Han dynasty (206 BC–220 AD) China, mercury, lead, and arsenic were used as ingredients in immortality elixirs. By the Tang dynasty alchemists in China wrote that their use could be dangerous. In Rome, in the second century B.C.E., Nicander wrote an account describing lead poisoning. The Industrial Revolution led to increased use of lead in manufacturing, smelting, and various trades, including the production and use of paints and enamels. The impact of lead, mercury and other poisons was documented in investigations such as Alice Hamilton's pioneering surveys of industrial illnesses. As of 1925, lead and mercury were included in the first list of compensable occupational diseases compiled by the International Labour Organization (ILO).

Despite the known dangers of lead, tetraethyl or tetramethyl lead was introduced as an additive for gasoline in the 1920s. Its use resulted in world-wide increases in environmental concentrations and toxic effects of inorganic and organic lead compounds, which became ubiquitous as a contaminant in soil, water and air. Although the United States introduced federal policies to remove lead from paint and passenger car gasoline in the 1970s’ and 1980s’, lead continues to be found in older paint and pipes and in soil and household dust. Water can become contaminated from contact with lead in pipes, plumbing fittings, fixtures, solder and flux, and from dishes containing lead. Cookware, foods, toys, jewelry, cosmetics, spices, and folk remedies that pre-date lead regulations or are made in countries where regulations are not applied may still contain dangerous levels of lead. Another major source of lead exposure comes from the improper recycling of lead–acid batteries and electronic waste. Plants grown in contaminated soil may contain lead, which can then enter the human food chain and increase risks to food safety and human health. Lead is most likely to enter the human body by being inhaled, eaten or drunk. Because small children naturally crawl on the ground and put their hands and other objects into their mouths, they are at higher risk for exposure to pollutants from paint, dust, and soil as well as air, food, and water.

There is no safe level of lead exposure. Lead affects multiple systems and causes neurological, motor, and behavioral deficits. Lead is easily absorbed through the respiratory tract and the duodenum and can cross the blood–brain barrier. More than 90 % is stored in bones and teeth, where it can remain for decades. Lead also accumulates in the liver, spleen, muscles, brain, kidneys, and lungs and is distributed in soft tissues. Mechanisms by which it affects the brain include oxidative stress, inflammation, calcium mimicry, and altered neurotransmission. Lead imitates ions such as calcium, taking its place in proteins and enzymes. This dysregulates cell processes involved in signaling pathways, ion transportation, enzyme regulation, and cell death. Acute lead exposure can cause decreases in synaptic proteins, synaptic dysfunction, changes to the cytoskeleton, and neuronal death. Acute nervous system effects can include convulsions, coma, and death.

Exposure to lead can also lead to intellectual impairment affecting memory, executive function, attention, and learning. Blood lead concentrations ≥ 5·0 μg/dL may result in children scoring 3–5 points lower in intelligence tests than those with concentrations < 5·0 μg/dL. Chronic lead exposure has been linked to lower brain volume and cognitive impairment. Lead exposure is also linked to psychological disorders including depression, anxiety, bipolar disorder, and schizophrenia, and increases in behaviors such as school failure, juvenile delinquency and adult arrests. Lead may also play a role in Alzheimer’s Disease. The impact on economic productivity has been estimated in terms of global economic losses of almost $1 trillion annually.

==== Mercury (Hg) ====
Environmental mercury occurs naturally but also is released into the environment through human activities such as industrial processing, mining, incineration of hazardous waste, and combustion of fossil fuels. Mercury accumulates in aquatic food chains and in the human body, and is able to cross both the blood–brain barrier and the placenta. Mercury exists in multiple forms: elemental mercury (Hg0), inorganic mercury salts (Hg1+ and Hg2+), and organomercury compounds such as methylmercury (MeHg). MeHg most easily crosses cell membranes and is therefore most neurotoxic. Mercury exposure can occur through inhalation, ingestion, or skin contact. Humans are most likely to be exposed domestically, due to eating fish or other foods contaminated by environmental pollution, or, less commonly, through medical or occupational exposures.

The effects of acute high-dose mercury poisoning vary depending on the type, route, amount, and duration of exposure. Chronic exposure to low-doses of mercury can cause serious and irreversible neurological damage in adults and interfere with fetal neurodevelopment. MeHg interferes with synaptic transmission and neuronal signaling, changes cell structures, increases inflammation and oxidative stress, and causes cell death. Because it can cross the blood-brain barrier and accumulate in the brain, mercury can continue to cause effects long after exposure ceases. Mercury poisoning can cause a wide range of symptoms involving multiple systems, including cognitive deficits, mood disorders, motor dysfunction, and death.

==== Cadmium (Cd) ====
Cadmium is a heavy metal that has been used in manufacturing of pigments, alloys, plastic stabilizers, nickel-cadmium (Ni-Cd) rechargeable batteries, solar cells, and as a protective coating for iron and steel. Cadmium can remain in contaminated water and soil for long periods, and be absorbed by plants to enter the food chain. The primary exposure route for humans is dietary intake followed less commonly by smoking or occupational exposure. The most frequently contaminated foods and drinks tend to be cereals, vegetables, seafood and chocolate.

Cadmium is highly toxic. Prolonged, low-dose cadmium exposure can significantly affect the nervous system. Cadmium mimics both zinc and calcium. It can travel across the blood-brain barrier (BBB) and accumulate in the central nervous system, where it disrupts mitochondrial respiration, increases the production of reactive oxygen species, and disrupts normal neurotransmission. Cadmium can damage the blood–brain barrier and alter glycogen metabolism. These mechanisms can result in nervous system damage and increased risk of neurological and neurodegenerative disorders.

=== Endocrine-disrupting chemicals ===
Endocrine-disrupting chemicals (EDCs) are defined by the World Health Organization as substances originating outside the body that interfere with the endocrine system. Examples include bisphenol A (BPA), phthalates, dioxins, and persistent organic pollutants (POPs) such as ﬂame retardants, polybrominated diphenyl ethers (PBDE), polychlorinated biphenyls and organochlorine pesticides. POPs, dioxins, PCBs, and some organochlorine pesticides are long-lasting lipophilic chemicals that can accumulate through the food chain. EDCs can be present in air, food, and water. They are widely found in pollutants, pesticides, plastics (including plastic baby bottles), industrial products, consumer goods, and medicines.

Normally, hormones are produced by the endocrine glands and transported to cells where they bind to receptors to regulate processes affecting development, growth, metabolism, immunity, reproduction, and behavior. EDCs can directly interfere with processes affecting the production, release, binding, transport, and elimination of hormones, and alter their effects on cells. Some EDCs can cross the placental barrier and affect prenatal development. EDCs have also been detected in breast milk and infant formulas. Effects of a specific EDC depend on multiple factors, including the developmental window during which exposure occurs, exposure pathways, timing, frequency and duration of exposure, route-specific absorption, and persistence of the EDC in the body.

Endocrine-disrupting chemicals can interfere with the nervous system's development and function. Exposure to endocrine-disrupting chemicals has been linked to neurodevelopmental disorders including autism spectrum disorder, attention-deficit hyperactivity disorder, global developmental delay, intellectual disability, and communication disorders.

==== Dioxins and dioxin-like compounds ====
Dioxins and dioxin-like compounds are highly persistent organic pollutants that contaminate aquatic and terrestrial systems, accumulate in food chains, and persist in the environment for long periods of time. They are extremely dangerous, even at low concentrations such as one part per billion. They include polychlorinated biphenyls (PCBs), polychlorinated dibenzo-p-dioxins (PCDFs or dioxins), and polychlorinated dibenzofurans (PCDDs or furans). Human activities contribute to their release through industrial processing and wastes, the production of fungicides, herbicides, and pesticides, pulp and paper production, the burning of fossil fuels and wood, waste incineration, e-waste recycling, industrial accidents, and military use. Dioxins also can be naturally released by wildfires and volcanic activity. Dioxins are most commonly found in pesticides or created as by-products of pesticide manufacture or degradation. Their most toxic form is 2,3,7,8-Tetrachlorodibenzo-p-dioxin (TCDD). Agent Orange, which contains dioxins, was used by the military in South Vietnam and the Korean Demilitarized Zone (DMZ) during the 1960s and 1970s, affecting American, Vietnamese, and Korean soldiers and civilians. Dioxins continue to contaminate soil and sediments and have multiple negative effects on the health of dioxin-exposed populations.

Dioxins interfere with the activities of the AhR signaling pathway, mediated by the aryl hydrocarbon receptor (AhR). AhR is widely distributed in the brain, and its activity differs before and after brain development. In addition to processes in brain development, AhR signaling pathways are involved in processes linked to aging, such as glial cell activation, inflammation, oxidative stress, mitochondrial dysfunction, and cellular senescence. AhR activation may regulate genes involved in synaptic plasticity and neurogenesis in the fully developed brain. Dioxins cause the dysregulation of dioxin-responsive genes in AhR signaling pathways. By interfering with hormones and gene expression, dioxins may increase immunotoxicity, endocrine disruption, and oxidative stress.

Dioxins are linked to widespread and potentially fatal health effects across multiple systems of the body. Prenatal and perinatal exposure to dioxins are associated with neurodevelopmental problems such as decreases in cognition, motor skills, attention, social-emotional skills, learning, and language. Exposure to dioxins at critical developmental periods may increase the risk of autism and other developmental disorders. The effects of dioxins are not limited to initial toxicity. Dioxins, through neuroplastic effects, may cause long-term damage that may not manifest itself for years or even decades. Genetic changes may extend health impacts across generations.

==== Microplastics ====
Microplastics (<5 mm) and nanoplastics (<1 μm) have become ubiquitous in the environment, in air, water and soil. Microplastics have been measured in human lung tissue, blood, placenta, breast milk, cerebrospinal fluid and olfactory bulb tissue. Microplastics have negative impacts on human health, including neurological processes. Other pollutants can "stick" to the surface of microplastics, including heavy metals (lead, mercury), endocrine-disrupting chemicals (BPA and phthalates), persistent organic pollutants (PCBs and dioxins) and bacteria. Microplastics can cross the blood–brain barrier and placental barrier, and can transport accumulated pollutants to the central nervous system and the developing fetal brain. Exposure to microplastics has been linked to both structural changes and functional deficits, including impaired cognitive function and changes in how the nervous system functions in later life. Oxidative stress has been identified as a pivotal mechanism between microplastic exposure and systemic toxicity.

=== Ozone (O_{3}) ===
Repeated exposure to low doses of ground-level ozone (O_{3}) has been suggested to produce chronic oxidative stress and the loss of synaptic plasticity, negatively affecting cognitive processes and information processing. Such changes may be related to the progression of neurodegenerative diseases. However, results from analyses of O_{3} pollution are varied. Meta-analyses have not provided support for the effects of ozone on the brain. O_{3} exposure was not associated with increased risk of cognitive impairment in a meta-analysis which found effects for PM_{2.5}, PM_{10}, and SO_{2}. Another meta-analysis found effects on health for SO_{2}, NO_{2}, and CO but not O_{3}.

=== Polycyclic aromatic hydrocarbons (PAHs) ===
Polycyclic aromatic hydrocarbons (PAHs) are atmospheric organic compounds composed of two or more benzene rings in various configurations and their functional derivatives. At least 300 different PAHs are known to exist. Benzo(a)pyrene is often measured as a marker compound indicating the presence of itself and other hazardous PAHs. PAHs are released through the combustion of hydrocarbons including coal, oil, wood, and petrol and can be present in air, water, soil, and food. PAHs exist as gases, are present in complex mixtures, and can attach to particulate matter.

PAH's genotoxic and carcinogenic properties have been well-documented. In comparison, research into the neurotoxic effects of PAHs is relatively new, with the number of research studies increasing significantly since 2010. Reviewers agree that there is evidence showing neurotoxic effects of PAHs through mechanisms of oxidative stress, inflammation, and passage through the blood-brain barrier, with the potential to affect cognitive function and neurodegeneration. Some researchers would prefer to see more research before considering the evidence to be conclusive as to whether "PAH exposure negatively impacts cognitive function and increases the risk of neurodegeneration in humans". Others consider that the neurotoxic effect of PAHs has been clearly established.

PAHs have been included in proposed standards for monitoring and limiting levels of air pollutants. PAHs were first included in the UK National Air Quality Strategy as of February 2003 as an Addendum to the Strategy. Standards for PAHs were introduced in the European Union under Directive 2004/107/EC of the European Parliament and of the Council of 15 December 2004, the Fourth Daughter Directive.

=== Volatile organic compounds (VOCs) ===
Volatile organic compounds (VOCs) are a major component of indoor air pollution. VOCs are carbon-based chemicals that easily evaporate into the air at room temperature. Sources include building materials, furnishings, carpets, household products such as paints, lacquers, dry cleaning and cleaning fluids, glues, permanent markers, printers and copiers, personal care products, and vehicle emissions. Types of chemical compounds include aldehydes, non-methane hydrocarbons, halocarbons, and BTX compounds (benzene, toluene, ethylbenzene, and xylenes). Formaldehyde is found in particle board, plywood, laminate and vinyl flooring, adhesives, paints, insulation, and can be released at high levels in new houses. VOCs can be released into the air both while a product is being used and when it is stored. The presence of specific VOCs in human breath, sebum, and feces are suggested to be biomarkers of neurdegenerative diseases. Ventilation is the most frequently identified factor for managing exposure to VOCs.

== Effects across the lifespan ==
Brain cell development begins during the third gestational week of human pregnancy, with synapses connecting neurons and supporting neural communication by the 23rd gestational week. Different parts of the brain and subpopulations of neurons within a single brain region can have different rates of development. The brain continues to develop beyond the postpartum period, with some regions of the brain continuing to mature through adolescence into the late twenties. In addition, new brain cells can grow and connections between brain cells can continue to adapt in the adult brain, supporting cognitive processes, learning and memory across the lifespan. The brain is particularly vulnerable during embryonic and fetal development. Conditions affecting development can result in structural, physiological and metabolic changes that have permanent life-long effects, including epigenetic changes that affect how cells function. The blood-brain barrier tends to be more permeable in the very young and the old, increasing the risk of pollutants and toxins entering the brain and causing neurological damage during these life stages.

Exposure to pollutants can alter both the structure and function of the brain. Mechanisms of action common to different types of pollutants include increased generation of reactive oxygen species (ROS), oxidative stress, and inflammation. Oxidative stress and inflammation can cause changes in the function of the blood-brain barrier and the placenta, enabling pollutants to cross them more easily. Pollutants may reach the brain by multiple pathways, directly through the olfactory system, or indirectly via the lungs or gut and bloodstream. In cases of direct neurotoxicity, environmental toxins that have reached the brain may directly damage cells. In cases of systemic inflammation, inflammation elsewhere in the body may trigger the release of cytokines which reach the brain through the circulatory system and activate microglia in the brain's immune system. This may lead to persistent neuroinflammation even if the primary environmental toxin does not enter the brain. Specific pollutants can disrupt a wide variety of processes involving cells, proteins, neurotransmitters, and the endocrine system, causing cellular and genetic damage. Many pollutants, including heavy metals, microplastics, and persistent organic pollutants, can accumulate in the body and brain and cause long-term effects including damage to cells and tissues.

Specific genetic markers (single-nucleotide polymorphisms, or SNPs) have been statistically identified that correlate with the likelihood that a person has been exposed to particular pollutants. These genetic proxies can provide more accurate assessments of individual pollutant exposure than general measures such as daily concentrations of major air pollutants or distance from a known pollution source. They can be used to investigate causal effects of air pollution. Genetic proxies for higher concentrations of NO_{x} and PM_{2.5} are associated with lower cognitive performance on scores for intelligence, fluid intelligence, and overall cognitive performance. Higher NO_{2} exposures are also associated with increased risks of schizophrenia, depression, and various forms of anxiety. Higher PM_{2.5} exposures are associated with increased risks of schizophrenia, depression and panic attacks.

=== Prenatal and neonatal ===
Expectant mothers and fetuses experience physiological changes that may increase vulnerability to the effects of air pollution. Pregnant women experience a 20% increase in oxygen intake, a 40% to 50% increase in the volume of air breathed per minute, and a 40% increase in cardiac output. This can increase the quantity of pollutants breathed in and circulated. Pollutants have been shown to cross the placenta and enter fetal circulation, affecting biological and developmental processes important to prenatal and neonatal health. Exposure to neurotoxicants during development can results in functional and structural changes in the brain and spinal cord. Epigenetic alterations in placental DNA may have long-term effects on the health of offspring. Gestational exposure to pollution can damage placental and fetal cells and is associated with an increased risk of negative fetal outcomes. Air pollution can affect both maternal and fetal health, increasing the likelihood of problems in pregnancy such as preeclampsia, gestational hypertension, intrauterine growth restriction, placental malfunction, miscarriage, premature delivery, and postpartum depression.

Neonates have a higher resting metabolic rate than older children or adults, breathing in twice as much air per body weight as adults. This increases the quantity of contaminants that can potentially enter an infant's lungs. Because the lungs of new-borns are still developing, and their airways are small, they are also more susceptible to effects of airborne pollutants such as inflammation. The immune system of a new-born is also still developing, and its development may be altered by pollutants. Air pollution is linked to negative neonatal outcomes including central nervous system damage and developmental delays. Gestational exposure to particulate matter and nitrogen dioxide have been linked to impaired lung function (PM_{10}, NO_{2}) and immune cell profiles and susceptibility to respiratory diseases, allergies, and asthma (PM_{2.5}, NO_{2}).

PM_{10}, PM_{2.5}, NO_{2}, SO_{2}, and black carbon have been strongly linked to negative pregnancy outcomes. Particulate matter, NO_{2} and carbon monoxide exposure are related to higher rates of pregnancy loss. PM_{2.5}, NO_{2}, and black carbon are linked to hypertensive diseases. PM_{2.5} and SO_{2} exposure during pregnancy increase the chance of having a baby too early or with a low birth weight. PM_{2.5} exposure during the third trimester has been related to increased risk of stillbirth. PM_{2.5} exposure during gestation and the first few months after giving birth increases the risk of postpartum depression. Components of air pollution such as endocrine-disrupting chemicals (EDCs) and polycyclic aromatic hydrocarbons (PAHs) can negatively affect fetal brain development, with impacts on mental or psychomotor development, cognition and behavior. Prenatal exposures to PM_{2.5}, NO_{2}, and PAHS are associated with problems in neurodevelopment at pre-school and school ages.

=== Childhood and adolescence ===
Exposure to pollution can lead to neurodevelopmental disorders involving brain development, cognitive function, intellectual development, and emotional and behavioral regulation, often becoming apparent during childhood or adolescence. Neurodevelopmental outcomes may include autism spectrum disorder (ASD) and attention-deficit hyperactivity disorder (ADHD). The effects of particulate matter may interact with gender.

The impact of air pollution on children's brains was first documented by Lilian Calderón-Garcidueñas. In a series of studies, she and her team detected neuropathological changes in the brains of children and young adults living in highly polluted Mexico City, compared to those raised in cleaner areas such as Polotitlán, Mexico. Children raised in areas of higher pollution were found to score lower on IQ tests, and showed signs of lesions in MRI scanning of the brain. In contrast, children from the low pollution area scored as expected on IQ tests and showed no significant sign of the risk of brain lesions. Some of the changes observed in children's brains are similar to changes found in Alzheimer's disease. An additional study based in Metropolitan Mexico City conducted by Lilian Calderón-Garcidueñas and her team recorded the hallmarks of fatal neurodegenerative disorders of subjects who resided in the highly polluted environment. The results demonstrated that starting in childhood, subjects experienced damage to the Neurovascular unit and showed hallmarks of fatal neurodegenerative diseases such as Alzheimer's disease, Parkinson's disease, frontotemporal lobe degeneration, and amyotrophic lateral sclerosis (ALS).

PM_{2.5} exposure is associated with reduced cognitive function in children, as measured by IQ scores. A 2024 meta-analysis pooled data from multiple studies. It reported that each 1 μg/m^{3} increase in PM_{2.5} was associated with decreases in Performance IQ (PIQ, -0.39 points), Verbal IQ (VIQ, -0.24 points) and Full-Scale IQ (FSIQ, -0.27 points). Longer-term impacts on children may include a range of developmental and behavioral deficits such as shortened attention span, poorer reading and math abilities, impairments in problem-solving abilities, reduced executive function and impulse control, increased aggressive behavior, and poorer school performance.

Because small children naturally crawl on the ground and put their hands and other objects into their mouths, they are at higher risk for exposure to pollutants found in paint, dust, soil, food, air and water. These can include heavy metals such as lead. Lead exposure can cause long-term neurological, motor, and behavioral deficits. It can lead to intellectual impairment affecting memory, executive function, attention, and learning. Lead is also linked to depression, anxiety, bipolar disorder, schizophrenia, school failure, and juvenile delinquency.

Prenatal exposure, infancy, and childhood have been identified as particularly vulnerable windows for harmful effects of endocrine-disrupting chemicals (EDCs). Bisphenol A (BPA) and phthalates are associated with neurobehavioral impairments in children. Phthalate exposure has been related to impaired psychomotor outcomes in children. Prenatal phthalate exposure may be associated with ASD and ADHD. EDCs such as dioxins, PCBs and organochlorine pesticides are consistently related to neurodevelopmental impairment and harmful long-term developmental effects. Brominated flame retardants (BFRs) and some PFAS are also linked to harmful neurodevelopmental and developmental outcomes.

=== Neurodevelopmental Disorders ===
==== Autism ====
Autism spectrum disorder (ASD) is characterized by deficits in communication and social behavior, repetitive behaviors, and stereotyped behaviors that typically begin to appear before the age of three. ASD is widely considered to be a multifactorial disease, in which multiple causes including exposure to pollutants interact with genetic predispositions to disrupt neurodevelopmental processes and increase the risk of developing autism. Prenatal and early-life exposures to air pollution have been identified as increasing the risk of autism. Pollutants that have been associated with the development of autism include heavy metals, particulate matter (e.g. PM_{2.5}), nitrogen oxides (e.g. NO_{2}), carbon monoxide, dioxins (e.g. PCBs) and endocrine-disrupting chemicals (e.g. phthalates). Some evidence suggests that there may be a genetic association connecting PM_{2.5} (but not PM_{10}) with elevated risk of ASD.

It has been suggested that prenatal and early childhood exposure to heavy metals like mercury (Hg), lead (Pb), cadmium (Cd), or arsenic (As) may put children at higher risk for ASD. Accurately measuring exposures to heavy metals is challenging. A 2026 review found that in 60% of studies of lead and 50% of studies of mercury, concentrations measured in blood and hair were associated with increased ASD risk and symptom severity. Results for cadmium and arsenic were not as consistent. The authors concluded that "lead and mercury may increase ASD risk or symptom severity in certain populations and under specific exposure conditions".

A February 2023 meta-analysis reported that maternal exposure to pesticides is associated with higher risk of ASD in their children. Organophosphorus pesticides and pyrethroids also increased ASD risk. Prenatal phthalate exposure, PCB exposure and organochlorine pesticides exposure also have been associated with ASD.

==== Attention deficit hyperactivity disorder ====
Attention-deficit hyperactivity disorder (ADHD) is characterized by recurring patterns of inattention, hyperactivity, impulsivity, and learning difficulties, that interfere with the ability to function effectively. ADHD is considered a multifactorial neurodevelopmental disorder shaped by genetic predispositions, environmental exposures, and epigenetic modifications. Age, gender, and cultural background are also factors. Girls tend to present with symptoms of inattention, while boys tend to present with hyperactivity.

Pollutants that have been associated with the development of ADHD include particulate matter (e.g. PM_{2.5}) and nitrogen oxides (e.g. NO_{2}). A February 2023 meta-analysis related maternal pesticide exposure to increased risk of ADHD in offspring and found that organochlorine pesticides (OCPs) increased ADHD risk. Pre and postnatal Bisphenol A (BPA) exposure has been associated with increased hyperactivity and ADHD symptoms. Prenatal phthalate exposure and PCB exposure have been associated with ADHD.

=== Adulthood ===
Pollution is linked to decreases in cognitive function and to mental health outcomes that are commonly diagnosed in adolescence or adulthood such as schizophrenia, neuroticism, depression, anxiety, and suicide.

==== Cognitive function ====
The effects of air pollution and particulate matter on cognitive performance are an active area of research. Cognitive impairment is a clinical term describing measurable deficits in domains such as memory, language, and reasoning. Long-term exposure to air pollution (including PM_{2.5} and NO_{2}) is a risk factor for impairment of general cognition in adults over 40 years of age. PM_{2.5} is also associated with decreases in verbal fluency and executive function in over-40s. Genetic proxies for higher concentrations of NO_{x} and PM_{2.5} are associated with lower cognitive performance on scores for intelligence, fluid intelligence, and overall cognitive performance.

A 2020 meta-analysis calculated that each 5 μg/m^{3} increase in PM_{2.5} concentration increased the risk of cognitive impairment by 8%. In terms of 5-year time periods, it has been calculated that each 1 µg/m^{3} increase in 5-year PM_{2.5} exposure can double the risk of mild cognitive impairment (MCI) and dementia. A 2025 meta-analysis concluded that PM_{10}, PM_{1}, and black carbon indicated that 1 μg/m^{3} increases in PM_{2.5}, PM_{10}, PM_{1} and black carbon were associated with decreased cognitive function. Meta-analysis and reviews also indicate that exposure to PM_{2.5}, PM_{10}, and SO_{2} are associated with decreases in global cognitive function. Improved air quality has been found to have a protective effect on cognitive function.

==== Epilepsy ====
Epilepsy is a condition marked by a predisposition to abnormal brain excitability, which may be aggravated by pollutants. It is hypothesized that air pollutants increase epilepsy risk through mechanisms that include neuroinflammation, oxidative stress and disruption of the blood–brain barrier. A 2025 meta-analysis indicates that PM_{2.5} and NO_{2} are associated with an increased risk of epilepsy. NO_{2} exposure may be linked to increased risk of epilepsy development. PM_{2.5} may be linked to increased risk of seizure events in individuals with epilepsy. SO_{2} has been suggested to have a role in the onset of epileptic seizures, as measured by outpatient visits and hospitalizations. SO_{2} may increase neuronal excitability.

==== Neuroticism ====
Genetic proxies for higher concentrations of NO_{2}, NO_{x}, and PM_{2.5} are significantly associated with higher neuroticism scores.

==== Multiple sclerosis ====
Multiple sclerosis (MS) is considered both an autoimmune and a neurodegenerative disorder. It commonly first presents in adults in their 20s and 30s, and is predominantly found in individuals under the age of 50. Multiple sclerosis is believed to involve autoreactive T cells crossing the blood–brain–barrier into the central nervous system, damaging myelin and oligodendrocytes, and causing neuronal damage and inflammation. Multiple sclerosis has been associated with living in areas with high particulate matter levels in the air. In a 2026 meta-analysis, long-term exposure (> 7 days) to particulate matter (PM_{2.5} and PM_{10}) was associated with higher MS risk. Short‐term exposure (≤ 7 days) to PM_{2.5}, PM_{10}, NO_{2}, and O_{3} was associated with a higher risk of relapses.

=== Mental Health Outcomes ===
A study estimating the impact of air pollution on mental health outcomes in Texas counties determined that PM_{2.5} negatively affects mental health in various ways. Directly, PM_{2.5} can cause neuroinflammation which can impair cytokine signaling that regulates brain functions such as mood. Indirectly, PM_{2.5} can exacerbate existing diseases, increasing the risk of mental health disorders, additionally, PM_{2.5} can disrupt a person's overall quality of life which can contribute to mental health issues. Using a comprehensive state data set for mental health diagnoses, the study found that for every 1 μg/m³ increase in PM_{2.5} concentration, overall mental health diagnoses increased by approximately 10 cases per 100,000 individuals.

==== Schizophrenia ====
Exposure to air pollution may be associated with elevated risk of schizophrenia. Schizophrenia is known to involve a complex interplay of genetic and environmental risk factors. Pollutants that increase neuroinflammation may alter the activity of immune-signaling genes associated with schizophrenia. Genetic proxies for higher concentrations of NO_{2} and PM_{2.5} are associated with increased risks of schizophrenia. A 2024 meta-analysis reported a highly causal relationship between nitrogen oxides (e.g. NO_{2}) and schizophrenia (P<0.001). It also found a strong causal relationship between PM_{10} and schizophrenia (P=0.008).

A 2023 meta-analysis examined the relationships of gaseous pollutants (NO_{2}, SO_{2}) and ambient particulates (PM_{2.5}, PM_{10}) with schizophrenia, as measured by outpatient and emergency room visits and hospital admissions. Increased risk for schizophrenic episodes was associated with short-term exposure to PM_{2.5}, PM_{10}, NO_{2}, and SO_{2}, measured in terms of the number of days between exposure and episode. Gases (NO_{2}, SO_{2}) were associated more strongly with immediate risk (same day) for an episode, and particulates with delayed risk (cumulative lag days). Different pollutants had a significant effect for different numbers of days, and peaked at different times. For example, the effects of SO_{2} were highest on the day of exposure, PM_{10} peaked at day 2, and PM_{2.5} peaked at day 5. It was also found that younger people were more sensitive to PM_{2.5} and PM_{10}, and that females were more susceptible than males to SO_{2} and NO_{2}.

==== Depression ====
Genetic proxies for higher concentrations of NO_{2} and PM_{2.5} are associated with increased risks of depression. A 2024 meta-analysis reported a strong causal relationship between PM_{2.5} and depression (P=0.001).

A 2022 meta-analysis reported increased risk of depression with long-term exposure (≥30 days) to PM_{2.5} and NO_{2}. Each 10 μg/m^{3} increase in long-term PM_{2.5} was related to an estimated 7% increased risk of depression. Each 10 μg/m^{3} increase in long-term NO_{2} was related to an estimated 4% increased risk of depression. Increased risk of depression was also reported with short-term exposure (<30 days) to PM_{2.5}, PM_{10}, NO_{2}, SO_{2}, and CO. Short-term exposures to PM_{10} and PM_{2.5} were associated with an approximately 1% increase in depression risk.

A 2026 meta-analysis examined the relationships of PM_{2.5}, PM_{10}, NO_{2}, and black carbon to depression. Long-term exposure (≥30 days) to all pollutants was related to increased risk for depression. Long-term exposure to PM_{2.5} and black carbon showed the greatest risks for depression. Short-term exposures (<30 days) to PM_{2.5}, PM_{10} and NO_{2} showed small but significant associations with depression.

==== Anxiety ====
Genetic proxies for higher concentrations of PM_{2.5} are associated with increases in panic attacks. Genetic proxies for higher concentrations of NO_{x} are associated with higher levels of anxiety-related traits such as panic attacks, social anxiety and social phobia.

A 2026 meta-analysis examined the relationships of PM_{2.5}, PM_{10}, NO_{2}, and black carbon to anxiety. Long-term exposure (≥30 days) to all pollutants was related to increased risk for anxiety. Long-term exposure to PM_{2.5} showed the most consistent association with anxiety. Short-term exposures (<30 days) to PM_{2.5}, PM_{10} and NO_{2} showed small but significant associations with anxiety.

==== Suicide ====
A 2026 meta-analysis reports that short-term exposure (<6 months) to PM_{2.5} and PM_{10} and long-term exposure (>6 months) to PM_{2.5} and NO_{2} are statistically related to increased risks of death by suicide, attempted suicide and suicide ideation. A 2025 meta-analysis also found that air pollution was linked to increased numbers of suicide attempts, and reported gender-related differences. Females were associated with higher rates of anxiety, self-harm, and suicidal ideation, while males were more likely to attempt or complete suicide.

An analysis of short-term exposure (0–7 days) from Korea found that higher levels of PM_{10} exposure were related to a higher risk of death by suicide. The relationship held for adults at all ages and for both males and females. Researchers also reported that the association between PM_{10} and suicide deaths was stronger for suicides who used non-violent methods than for suicides who used violent methods.

=== Aging ===
Pollution is associated with neurological conditions in later life such as migraines and stroke, accelerated cognitive decline, and neurodegenerative disorders such as multiple sclerosis, amyotrophic lateral sclerosis (ALS), dementia, Alzheimer's disease, and Parkinson's disease. Many late-onset diseases are linked to inflammation and neurodegeneration, and are worsened by inflammatory processes. At low levels, neuroinflammation is a beneficial response meant to protect the brain from infections and injuries by limiting damage and removing pathogens, debris, and misfolded proteins. However, prolonged neuroinflammation can cause neuronal damage and increase neurodegeneration. Inflammation tends to increase naturally with age. Pollutants such as particulates and heavy metals increase inflammation and cause the central nervous system to age more quickly, resulting in individuals displaying signs of disease at earlier ages than would be typically expected.

There are a number of plausible biological mechanisms by which air pollutants can interact with inflammatory processes to harm the brain. Brain injury may develop as a result of both neuroinflammatory and systemic inflammatory responses to air pollution. Long-term exposure to air pollutants, particularly fine particulate matter, can affect the cardiovascular system. Pollutants in the bloodstream trigger widespread inflammation and oxidative stress. This can damage blood vessels, lessen blood flow, and reduce the supply of oxygen and nutrients carried through the bloodstream to the brain. These indirect mechanisms potentially lead to brain injuries such as white matter injury, cerebral ischaemia, and mini-strokes. Studies of white matter volume have found associations between exposure to air pollution and reduced white matter volume.

Other mechanisms have been suggested by which air pollutants could have more direct effects on the brain. Small particles can enter the cardiovascular system via the lungs or gut. Once in the bloodstream, they can be transported to the brain. Some pollutants are small enough to cross the blood-brain barrier (BBB) and enter the brain. Exposure to pollutants also can lead to the structural and functional breakdown of the blood-brain barrier (BBB), making it possible for larger materials to enter the brain. Air pollution can increase levels of plasma fibrinogen, a clotting factor within blood vessels, which acts as a neurotoxin if it crosses the blood-brain barrier (BBB) and leaks into brain tissue. The blood-brain barrier tends to be more permeable in the very young and old, making these two life stages more susceptible to the entry of particles into the brain, and increasing the potential for neurological damage.

Small particles that are inhaled may also enter the brain via the olfactory nerves through the nasal passages to the olfactory bulbs, bypassing the blood-brain barrier entirely. Tiny particles such as metals, carbons, and plastics can bypass the blood-brain barrier (the body's filtering system) and enter the brain as they are breathed in. Once fine particulate matter and toxic nanoparticles reach the brain, they can stimulate immune cells in the brain such as microglia and astrocytes. This can lead to chronic neuroinflammation and oxidative stress and cause damage to nerve cells. Particles which enter the brain are cleared from the brain only slowly, if at all, increasing the potential for toxic materials within the brain to produce long-lasting harms.

In 2022, the UK's Committee on the Medical Effects of Air Pollutants (COMEAP) reviewed nearly 70 studies of human populations. COMEAP concluded that there is evidence to suggest that air pollution can contribute to both the acceleration of cognitive decline and the risk of developing dementia. COMEAP further concluded that air pollution, especially particulate matter, increases the risk of cardiovascular and cerebrovascular disease, which is likely to be causally associated with adverse effects on cognitive function in older people.

==== Cognitive decline ====
Cognitive decline is a functional measure of the worsening of memory or thinking skills over time. The primary factor in cognitive decline is age: cognitive function decreases with age. Air pollution has been identified as an additional crucial factor that contributes to cognitive decline in males and females. Men were more likely to be affected by PM_{2.5} in outdoor air pollution while women were more likely to be affected by the combustion of non-clean household fuels used in heating and cooking. Epidemiological studies suggest that PM_{2.5} and to a lesser degree PM_{10} are linked to increased cognitive decline. COMEAP concluded in 2022 that there is evidence to support the contribution of air pollution to acceleration of cognitive decline. Meta-analysis and reviews also indicate that exposure to PM_{2.5}, PM_{10}, and SO_{2} are associated with accelerated cognitive decline.

==== Dementia ====
Dementia is an umbrella term for a range of conditions that affect how the brain works, reducing the ability to remember, think and reason. Dementia mainly affects older people and gets worse over time. The proportion of the population that is affected is strongly age-related, doubling every 5–6 years past the age of 65. Dementia is characterized by progressive cognitive decline due to neuronal losses in the brain.

Subtypes of dementia are related to vascular dementia (VaD), Alzheimer’s disease (AD), Lewy body dementia (LBD, which includes both dementia with Lewy bodies and Parkinson's disease dementia), and frontotemporal dementia (FTD). These subtypes differ in underlying pathologies, symptoms, and progression, but also share overlapping features. Vascular dementia results from disrupted blood flow to the brain. Alzheimer's disease is associated with amyloid-beta (Aβ) plaques and hyperphosphorylated tau co-pathology. Frontotemporal dementia also involves tau or TDP-43 pathology. Lewy body dementia (LBD) involves alpha-synuclein (α-syn) aggregation.

Evidence suggests that long-term exposure to air pollutants is associated with the acceleration of cognitive decline and the induction of dementia. The association between exposure to air pollutants and secondary effects of cardiovascular system damage on cognitive decline and dementia is likely to be causal. Higher risk of all-cause dementia has been associated with air pollution including particulate matter (PM), fine particulate matter (PM_{2.5}), nitrogen dioxide (NO_{2}), nitrogen oxides (NOx), and carbon monoxide (CO). A burden of proof meta-analysis has indicated a significant but nonlinear relationship between PM_{2.5} exposure and risk of dementia, indicating that a steep increase in dementia risk occurred as PM_{2.5} exposure rose to levels around 15 µg m^{−3}, followed by a flatter rate of increase at higher exposures.

===== Alzheimer's disease =====
In terms of subtypes, the association between pollutants and dementia is most pronounced with respect to Alzheimer's disease and vascular dementia. Alzheimer's disease (AD) is the most common form of dementia, estimated by the World Health Organization to contribute to 60–70% of dementia cases worldwide. Clinically it is marked by progressive memory failure, language and executive dysfunction, and behavioral changes.

Long-term exposure to PM_{2.5} has been found to increase the risk of dementia in Alzheimer's disease. Alzheimer's disease has also been linked to exposure to heavy metals such as arsenic and mercury. Environmental pollutant exposures are linked to AD through shared pathogenic mechanisms including oxidative stress, neuroinflammation, disruption of the blood–brain barrier, epigenetic changes, disruption of the gut microbiota, and tau kinase dysregulation, collectively resulting in amyloid-β accumulation, tau hyperphosphorylation, synaptic loss, and neurodegeneration.

The work of Lilian Calderón-Garcidueñas on the effects of Mexico City air pollution has shown that exposure to air pollutants in children and young adults is associated with decline of cognitive function and with neuropathological changes similar to those in Alzheimer's disease. Neuropathological hallmarks of Alzheimer's including hyperphosphorylated tau pretangles, amyloid-β42 deposits, and inflammatory markers were found in infants as young as 11 months, children, and young adults. This suggests that neuropathological changes consistent with Alzheimer's may begin as early as childhood in heavily polluted environments.

==== Vascular dementia ====
Vascular dementia is a pathological condition in the elderly characterized by progressive cognitive dysfunction and is the second most common form of dementia, after Alzheimer's disease. Vascular dementia is a form of dementia which is caused by damage to the blood vessels in the brain. Air pollution's effects in the cerebrovascular system include stroke, vascular dementia, and other types of dementia.

Exposure to air pollution has been positively associated with an increased risk of stroke hospital admission (PM_{2.5}, PM_{10}, SO_{2}, NO_{2}, CO, and O_{3}), incidence (PM_{2.5}, SO_{2}, and NO_{2}), and mortality (PM_{2.5}, PM_{10}, SO_{2}, and NO_{2}). Small particle pollution is particularly linked to vascular dementia with a "well-recognized link between PM_{2.5} and vascular injury and the role of vascular injury in dementia".

===== Lewy body dementia (LBD) =====
Lewy body dementia is a progressive brain disorder in which abnormal clumps of alpha-synuclein protein called Lewy bodies damage nerve cells and interfere with chemical messaging in the brain. Symptoms of Lewy body dementia include cognitive decline, parkinsonism, and visual hallucinations, which may fluctuate. Lewy body dementia (LBD) includes two types of α-synucleinopathies, dementia with Lewy bodies (DLB) and Parkinson's disease dementia (PDD). In dementia with Lewy bodies (DLB), indicators of cognitive decline tend to predate or occur with movement symptoms. In Parkinson's disease dementia (PDD) movement symptoms tend to appear first and dementia later.

A 20-year retrospective study in the Danish population reported that each 5 μg/m^{3} increase in PM_{2.5} exposure was associated with nearly 4 times as great a risk of DLB. Each 10 μg/m^{3} increase in NO_{2} exposure was associated with nearly twice the risk of DLB. The study further reported that each 5 μg/m^{3} increase in PM_{2.5} exposure was associated with more than twice the risk of developing PDD. Each 10 μg/m^{3} increase in NO_{2} exposure was associated with a 14% greater risk of PDD.

==== Parkinson's disease (PD) ====
Parkinson’s disease (PD) is the second most common neurodegenerative disorder. In Parkinson's, progressive deterioration of dopamine-producing neurons in the substantia nigra primarily impacts the motor system. Mitochondrial dysfunction and α-synuclein (a-syn) pathology are key contributors to the development of PD. Clinical symptoms include muscle rigidity, tremor, bradykinesia, and postural instability. PD involves both genetic and environmental factors. Gene-environment interactions in PD suggest that genetic factors likely increase the risk of neuronal damage and of developing PD, for specific individuals who have underlying genetic predispositions in a population that is exposed to toxic chemicals.

Parkinson's disease is strongly associated with agricultural activities and the use of pesticides, which vary widely in different locations and countries. Multi-decade studies have identified an increased likelihood of Parkinson's related to pesticide exposure, agricultural work, and rural living. Chlorinated solvents, used in commercial and industrial applications like dry cleaning and degreasing, particularly trichloroethylene, are also associated with increased PD risk. According to Lancet (2021), exposure to "environmental pollution with toxins, such as pesticides (eg, paraquat) or chemicals (eg, trichloroethylene), known to be harmful to Parkinson's disease-related neurons and brain circuits," is associated with Parkinson's disease. Other chemical risk factors include manganese, particulate matter related to traffic, and exposure to heavy metals such as mercury and lead.

==== Amyotrophic lateral sclerosis (ALS) ====
Amyotrophic lateral sclerosis (ALS) is the most common type of motor neuron disease (MND). In MNDs, the nerve cells that control movement deteriorate and stop working, leading to progressive muscle weakness, paralysis, and respiratory failure. ALS accounts for 85% to 90% of MND cases. Neuroinflammation and neurodegeneration are key features of ALS. Neuroinflammation appears to contribute to motor neuron death, influencing disease progression. Cytokines are involved in both promoting and inhibiting neuroinflammation in ALS. Both environmental and genetic factors may influence disease progression. While results are somewhat mixed, air and water pollution have been identified as potential risk factors for ALS. Some evidence suggests that exposure to particulate matter and to NO_{2}, over periods ranging from 1 to 10 years, is associated with increased risk of MND and ALS, accelerated disease progression, and increased mortality.

== Mitigations ==
Environmental pollution is a potentially preventable contributor to disease burden. Risk management can be thought of in terms of three phases: hazard identification (determining what health and safety concerns are present), exposure assessment (identifying routes of exposure) and exposure control (putting procedures in places to minimize or eliminate exposures).

On an individual level, steps can be taken to minimize exposures to pollutants such as avoiding smoking, minimizing dust, using glass instead of plastics, carefully selecting cleaning products and cosmetics, and avoiding idling vehicles and heavy traffic routes. Personal exposures can be reduced through daily activities, while systemic policy actions can be adopted at local, national, and international levels. Increasing ventilation and improving or replacing cooking stoves to reduce the burning of gas and solid fuels can substantially reduce indoor exposure to particulate matter and carbon monoxide. Exposure to air pollutants may be lessened by staying away from places that have high levels of pollution, avoiding secondary contamination from other persons and their belongings, improving cleanliness (both personal hygiene and one's surroundings), and using face masks and air purifiers. Making healthy dietary choices and getting good quality sleep can help the body to defend against the effects of pollutants.

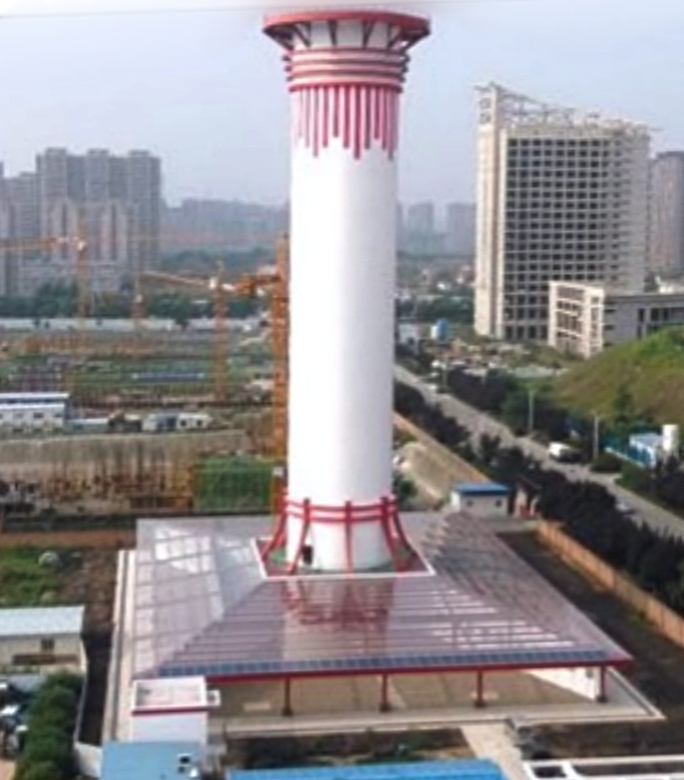
First generation SALSCS (Solar-assisted Large Scale Cleaning System), Xi'an

Urban planning can keep sources of pollutants away from residents and improve conditions. Strategies for controlling air pollution tend to involve either restricting emissions or controlling the location and spatial distribution of emission sources. Ideally, pollution is not emitted, but if it is, emissions should be minimized and removed at the source as soon as possible. If not removed at the source, barriers can be used to control it. If barriers do not work well or are not installed properly and the pollutants escape, neighbors may need to take steps to protect their premises. Large scale passive air cleaning systems such as the Xi'an smog tower may help to improve nearby air quality. Clean-up programmes may need to use scientific and technological remediation methods to remove toxicants and prevent further contamination.

Systemic policy actions like green transit, clean energy adoption, and industrial emission controls can be adopted at local, national, and international levels. Local, state and national governments can establish policies and regulatory bodies, and carry out regulatory and cleanup activities to minimize population exposures to pollution. Governments can participate in international agreements to reduce air pollution, increase use of renewable energy and clean fuels, and support the use of low- or no-pollution vehicles such as electric cars. The most frequently used policy initiatives are directed at the transportation sector. In countries where air pollution control measures have been enacted, most cases have resulted in positive outcomes.

=== Personal activities ===
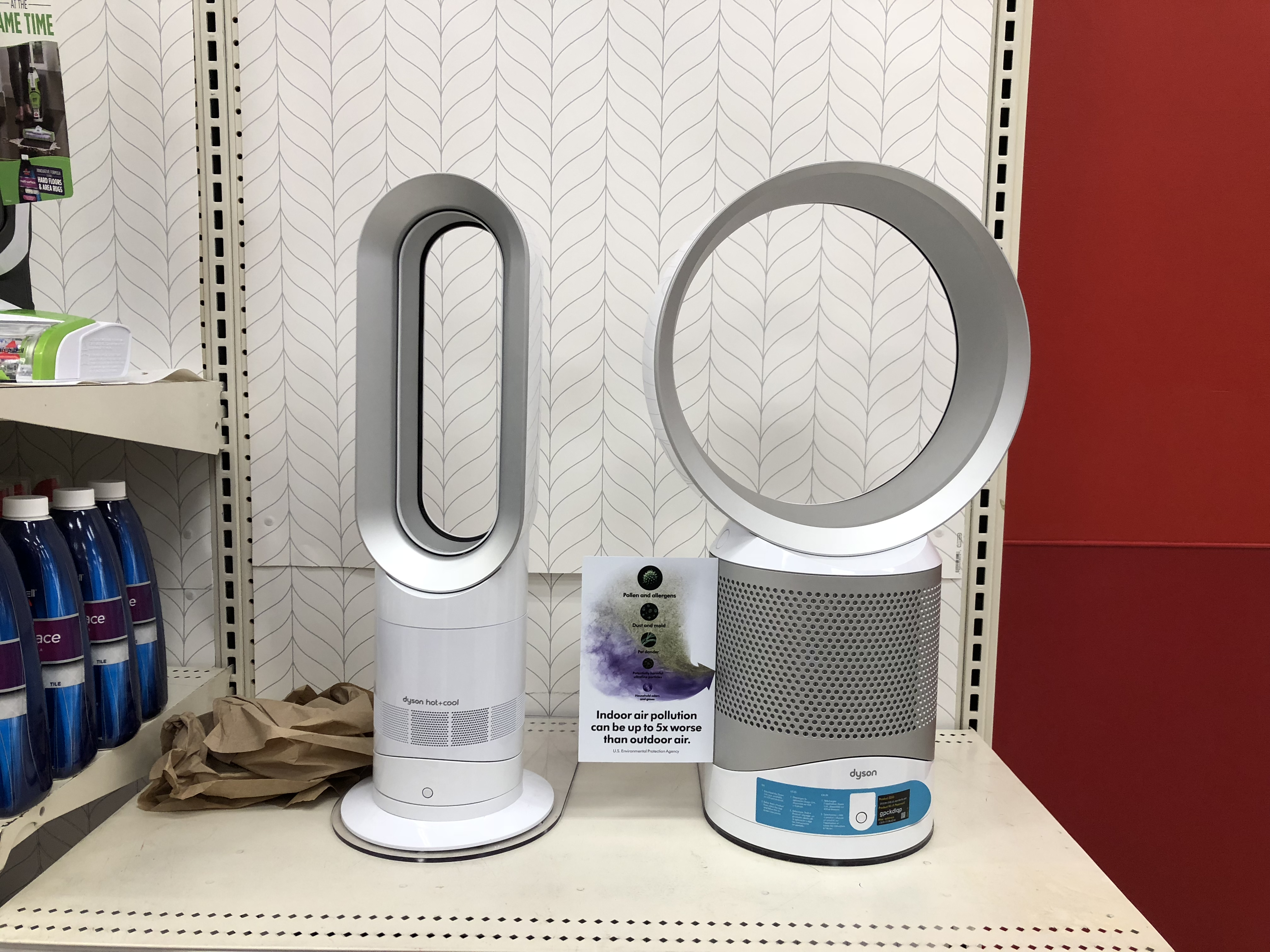
Air-purifiers with air flow generated by bladeless fan.

Air pollution constantly circulates, with outdoor air infiltrating into buildings, and pollutants from indoor activities lingering or escaping outward. In addition to pollutants originating from the built environment and activities within a building, an estimated 40–60% of indoor pollutants come from outdoors. Outdoor air pollution from traffic, fires, smog and pollen can migrate into buildings through cracks in walls and foundations, leaks around windows and doors, and through ventilation systems. The most common pollutants affecting indoor air quality tend to be particulate matter, volatile organic compounds (VOCs), carbon oxides (CO, CO_{2}), nitrogen oxides (NO_{x}), and formaldehyde (HCHO).

Improvement of indoor air quality (IAQ) generally relies on four core strategies: source management, ventilation, filtration, and humidity control. The following recommendations for personal strategies to minimize the effects of air pollution have been developed based on scientific research.

To minimize personal exposure to indoor pollution:

- Reduce sources of household air pollution including both first- and second-hand smoke. Avoid tobacco, marijuana, and vaping.
- Avoid burning of incense and candles.
- Do not use open fireplaces.
- Use clean fuels for heating and cooking rather than gas or solid fuels, and ventilate well. Improve cook stove quality if possible.
- When outdoor air quality is good, use natural ventilation to refresh indoor air, depending on season, housing type, and window openings.
- Use low- or high-efficiency indoor air filtration to improve ventilation (e.g. Portable air cleaners fitted with HEPA filters).
- Weatherize buildings by fixing cracks and leaks that let in pollution from outdoor air.
- Raise indoor temperatures and clean more frequently to counter dampness and mold.
- Remove and minimize dust, using damp mops rather than dry sweeping when cleaning.
- Remove shoes when entering a house rather than wearing shoes inside.
- Carpets can trap and hold pollutants and may need to be cleaned or removed.
- Carefully select cleaning products and cosmetics to avoid harmful ingredients.
- If using products such as paints, cleaning fluids, or pesticides, follow label instructions carefully and increase ventilation.
- Use glass instead of plastics and avoid plastic packaging.
- Eat a healthy, balanced diet high in fruits and vegetables and low in fats.
- Test water systems and use household water purification methods such as water filters as needed to reduce water contamination risks.
- If pets are present, increased ventilation and more frequent cleaning are recommended.

To minimize personal exposure to outdoor (ambient) pollution:

- Be aware of local air pollution levels using information from local air quality forecasts and maps.
- Wear close-fitting facemasks (e.g. N95 or KN95) when ambient air pollution levels are high.
- Exercise regularly but minimize outdoor activity when ambient air pollution levels are high.
- When possible, cycle or walk rather than using motorized fossil-fuel driven vehicles, to obtain the benefit of exercise and to minimize contributions to pollution.
- Choose low-traffic routes and routes with open spaces to minimize near-road air pollution exposure. Minimize travel at peak times, and avoid waiting in areas of high air pollution.
- Share rides and use public transportation.
- Optimize driving style and vehicle settings: drive with windows closed when in traffic, use car air filtration systems, and avoid engine idling.
- Increase green space by planting trees and other vegetation. Shorter vegetation, particularly plantings that are dense and porous, can be placed close to roads to reduce air pollution. Green roofs and living walls can also reduce pollution but can be costly and complicated to maintain.

==== Healthy life styles ====
Lifestyle factors such as substance use, stress, physical activity, and sleep are known to interact with environment and genetics. They can affect health and brain plasticity, influencing disease progression over time. These factors often share common pathways such as oxidative stress, inflammation, vascular injury, mitochondrial dysfunction, and protein misfolding. Actions that support a more healthy lifestyle include avoiding smoking (tobacco, marijuana and vaping), not drinking alcohol, engaging in regular physical activity, and eating a healthy diet. These factors promote brain health by reducing inflammation, increasing neuroplasticity, and improving cardiovascular functioning. As well, the use of personal-level air filtration has been reported to reduce indoor PM_{2.5} concentrations by 11%-82%, depending on geographical location, air pollution sources, indoor environment, and filtration technology.

==== Exercise ====
While air pollution can negatively affect cognitive and executive function, a healthy lifestyle can have beneficial effects and may help to counter the harmful effects of pollutants like particulate matter (PM_{2.5}). For example, one study suggests that an extra 13.6 minutes of moderate-to-vigorous physical activity (MVPA) can help to offset the negative cognitive effects of an increase of 10 μg/m3 of PM_{2.5}.

While exercising is beneficial, care should be taken to avoid exercising in polluted environments. Increased respiratory rates during aerobic exercise may increase the inhalation of harmful particulate matter into the lungs. When particulate matter levels are reported to be high outside, consider exercising inside. Avoid exercising near high-pollution areas such as heavily-trafficked roads.

==== Food ====
Nutrients such as vitamins, minerals, omega-3 fatty acids, polyphenols and carotenoids have been shown to counter inflammation and oxidative stress. Foods high in omega-3 fatty acids include fatty fish (e.g. mackerel, salmon, shellfish), seeds and nuts (flaxseeds, chia seeds, walnuts, canola oil), beans and soy products (navy beans, tofu), and other plant sources (brussels sprouts, avocados). Polyphenols are plant-based water-soluble compounds that can give red, blue and purple colors to many fruits (e.g. berries, apples, grapes), vegetables, herbs, teas, coffee, spices, seeds, and nuts. Carotenoids are the fat-soluble organic pigments that give many yellow, orange and red fruits and vegetables their color. Carotenoids and polyphenols have antioxidant and anti-inflammatory properties. Diets that increase intake of omega-3 fatty acids and antioxidants, such as the Mediterranean diet, may offer protective benefits. Health experts recommend eating whole foods as the best source of omega-3s, rather than supplements.

An examination of dietary patterns found that ten patterns for healthy eating were associated with metabolic indicators of slower biological aging. There was no single 'correct' diet. Participants who scored well on one definition of healthy eating did not necessarily score well on all others, but all of the healthy diets showed benefits. Over 70% of the underlying biological pathways related to cell structure, cell signaling and metabolism were shared by all ten dietary patterns. Some dietary patterns were also related to diet-specific pathways that reflected their main objectives. The DASH diet was uniquely associated with heart-related pathways. The MIND diet was based on the DASH diet and the Mediterranean diet and designed to target brain health. The MIND diet showed unique associations with memory and cognitive function. Anti-inflammatory diets also recommend limiting foods that may contribute to inflammation such as fatty red meat, refined sugar in foods and beverages, and excess alcohol. Anti-inflammatory diets may be of benefit in cases of Alzheimer's disease.

There is some evidence that a classic ketogenic diet (CKD) or modified Atkins diet (MAD) can be beneficial in controlling seizures in drug-resistant epilepsy.

==== Vitamins ====
The human diet contains important nutrients including carbohydrates, proteins, fats, vitamins, and minerals. Under the European Union's food laws, health claims about foods and components such as vitamins require scientific assessment and approval from the European Food Safety Authority (EFSA) before they can be used in labeling and advertising. Authorized health claims are listed in the EU Register of Nutrition and Health Claims. A number of claims have been accepted in the EU Register, related to the ability of vitamins A, B-complex, C, D, E, and K, to support cognitive function and help to protect the nervous system against neurodegenerative diseases.

Vitamins can play a significant role in supporting the brain and nervous system through mechanisms such as reducing oxidative stress, inflammation, and neuronal deterioration, and supporting synaptic function and neuroplasticity. Specific vitamins have been found to offer protective effects and may help to prevent, treat, or slow progression of neurodegenerative diseases. However, excessive doses of supplements can be harmful, particularly fat soluble vitamins such as A, D, E, and K, which can be stored in the body. In contrast, B and C vitamins are water-soluble, are not stored, and regularly need to be supplied.

Vitamin A (retinoic acid) can counter oxidative stress, modulate immune responses, and reduce neuroinflammation, potentially protecting against diseases like mild cognitive impairment, Alzheimer’s and Parkinson’s.

Various B vitamins are important in normal energy metabolism and functioning of the immune and nervous systems, and may have a protective effect against oxidative damage and neurodegenerative diseases. Low levels of B vitamins have been linked to cognitive decline.

Vitamin C is a powerful antioxidant that neutralizes free radicals and reactive oxygen species (ROS), protecting neurons from oxidative stress. Vitamin C is involved in the production of neurotransmitters such as dopamine, noradrenaline, and serotonin, and in collagen synthesis, supporting the health of neurons and the blood–brain barrier. Vitamin C protects cells and contributes to the normal functioning of the nervous system.

Vitamin D is involved in the production of growth factors that promote the survival, growth, and repair of neurons, and neurotransmitters that are needed for cognitive and motor functions such as acetylcholine, dopamine, and gamma-aminobutyric acid (GABA). Low levels of vitamin D have been associated with an increased risk of cognitive impairment.

Vitamin E (e.g. alpha-tocopherol) can neutralize free radicals, protect cells from oxidative stress, and improve myelin function. Vitamin E deficiency increases oxidative stress and accelerates neuron loss. Low levels of vitamin E are associated with a greater risk of cognitive disorders, dementia, and Alzheimer’s disease.

Vitamin K may have antioxidant and anti-inflammatory properties. It is important for the normal functioning of blood and bone, and for the survival and growth of nerve cells. Vitamin K has been linked to reductions in oxidative damage and neuroinflammation, and to improved cognitive abilities.

A 2025 meta-analysis reported that prenatal vitamin D deficiency was associated with nearly twice the odds of Autism Spectrum Disorder (ASD) in offspring. Excessively elevated B12 concentrations in mothers, often in combination with folate excess, were also linked to increased ASD risk in offspring. Taking folic acid and multivitamin supplements including vitamin D while pregnant is associated with a decreased risk of ASD in offspring.

=== Professional activities ===
==== Community organization ====
Community organization can support healthy changes. Organizations can collaborate with residents to improve the physical environment, both indoors and outdoors, and support behavioral changes to improve air quality and reduce pollution exposures. An example is the banning of indoor smoking in restaurants and other public spaces. Behavioral changes are more likely to be adopted when personal and interpersonal connections are integrated with community-level actions and programs. Community involvement can be particularly important in ensuring that air quality issues are addressed in public buildings such as educational institutions.

==== Building design ====
Building and landscape design and urban planning can help to minimize the effects of pollution on populations. Buildings can be designed to be more energy efficient, using technologies such as better insulation, solar energy, and renewable power sources. Professional organizations like ASHRAE publish technical standards for buildings that address topics such as indoor environmental quality (IEQ) in buildings. Creating a tight building envelope to keep out pollutants must be balanced by installing mechanical ventilation systems to ensure that air circulates properly and pollutants do not build up inside. Ventilation has been identified as a key factor in controlling exposure to indoor air pollutants. Designers and contractors can also choose materials and construct buildings in ways that minimize the potential for pollutants to be released during and after construction. Vegetation can be introduced both indoors and outdoors through amenities such as green roofs and green walls. Green roofs, green walls, trees, gardens and parks can help to remove pollutants such as PM_{2.5} and carbon dioxide from the air. Regulatory frameworks for indoor air quality could potentially establish standards for public buildings, such as workplaces, schools, and hospitals.

==== Urban planning ====
Air quality management can be considered in terms of intervening in "the process of a person coming into contact with a pollutant." Best practices for dealing with air pollution should include situating large sources of pollutants such as major roadways, ports, and rail yards far away from residential areas, schools, day care centers, playgrounds, and hospitals. Planning efforts in areas such as Camden, New Jersey, and Los Angeles and Long Beach, California, have resulted in emissions reductions. Urban planning can help to reduce air pollution by improving public transportation, providing pedestrian walkways and bicycle networks separate from vehicle traffic, and supporting renewable energy use to reduce emissions. Traffic management strategies such as speed reduction, carsharing, congestion pricing, low emission zones, and electronic toll collection can also help to limit emissions.

Low-density areas of development with more green space tend to have better air quality. Mixed use developments reduce the number of vehicle miles driven, reducing pollution at the source. Interconnected green spaces, eco-corridors, and open buffer zones can be used to separate industrial facilities and waste sites from residential areas. Green infrastructure has multiple benefits: reducing stormwater in sewer systems, preventing flooding, improving water quality, reconnecting eco-systems, and reducing the heat island effect as well as improving air quality. Infrastructure that supports healthy urban physical activity can be an important step towards promoting brain health. Urban planners can locate green spaces, parks, and recreational areas away from roads and traffic to promote activity and protect populations.

Efficient waste management and green buildings can help to reduce air pollution. Depending on local topography, wind corridors, physical barriers and vegetation may be used to direct air flow and improve urban ventilation. Vegetation with a high leaf area density can be a multi-purpose alternative to sound walls near roadways, providing both sound dampening and absorption of pollutants. Ventilation corridors can be carefully situated to introduce natural wind air flow into urban areas, to lower temperatures and improve air quality.

==== Agricultural practices and landscape management ====
In some areas, wind erosion can lift sand and dust from bare, dry soils into the air and transport it for long distances. Areas that are affected by sand and dust storms may be able to use measures to prevent wind erosion from occurring or influence the transport and deposition of dust. These can include both local and larger area control measures to protect soil, reduce wind speed, decrease sand and dust mobilization, and promote deposition of sand and dust. Agricultural techniques for controlling wind erosion can include minimum tillage practices and planting of windbreaks. Reforestation and development of other green spaces may be usable across larger areas to combat desertification, halt or reverse land degradation, and mitigate sand and dust. Proposed control measures must carefully consider local environmental conditions, water resources, and adaptation of plant species.

==== Public health ====
WHO's air quality guidelines provide a basis for risk communication, the identification of those most at risk, and potential behaviors to reduce risk. Medical organizations such as the UK's Royal College of Physicians and the European Respiratory Society recommend that healthcare professionals be able to advise patients about the effects of air pollution and steps that can be taken to avoid negative effects. This is particularly important for higher-at-risk populations such as pregnant women, children, and older people.

At the level of target populations, Air Pollution Health Risk Assessment (AP-HRA) methods can be used predictively to develop and implement control strategies for impacting air quality and improving industrial safety and public health.

In 2022, InSPIRE, a group of academics and other stakeholders in the United Kingdom, outlined a policy agenda for brain health, identifying 14 priorities in the three policy domains of research and funding, education and awareness, and policy evaluation. Education and awareness recommendations included (8) informing people about the importance of air quality as a public health issue (9) developing educational materials (10) connecting air pollution and brain health to existing public health initiatives and (11) providing publicly available monitoring, assessment and screening tools.

We identified three policy domains and 14 priority areas. Research and Funding included: (1) embracing a complexities of place approach that (2) highlights vulnerable populations; (3) details the impact of ambient PM2.5 on brain health, including current and historical high-resolution exposure models; (4) emphasises the importance of indoor air pollution; (5) catalogues the multiple pathways to disease for brain health and dementia, including those most at risk; (6) embraces a life course perspective; and (7) radically rethinks funding. Education and Awareness included: (8) making this unrecognised public health issue known; (9) developing educational products; (10) attaching air pollution and brain health to existing strategies and campaigns; and (11) providing publicly available monitoring, assessment and screening tools. Policy Evaluation included: (12) conducting complex systems evaluation; (13) engaging in co-production; and (14) evaluating air quality policies for their brain health benefits.

==== Healthcare environments ====
Healthcare environments may have additional requirements in terms of managing and monitoring indoor air quality, to ensure the safety of both patients and healthcare workers. Management of healthcare environments must address biological contaminants such as viruses, bacteria, pollen, microbial spores, and allergens. Materials used in medical procedures and the frequent use of cleaning, disinfectant, and sterilising agents may increase the potential for chemical exposures and contamination of indoor air. Ventilation systems, cleaning and disinfection protocols, and operational procedures may need to be monitored and adjusted in real time to ensure the control of both surface contamination and indoor air quality.

=== Government policies ===
The United Nations (UN) and the World Health Organization (WHO) officially recognize the right to clean air as a fundamental human right. However, around the world, legislation for air quality tends to be fragmented, with regulatory gaps and a lack of standards. A review of air quality standards for PM_{2.5} concentration worldwide examined enforced, voluntary and target policies in 58 countries, up to 2020. The study recommended that the WHO modify its guidelines to improve comparability of results, by specifying a universal PM_{2.5} definition based on aerodynamic diameter, and establishing a common averaging and data recording method. It also recommended that regulatory agencies and governments adopt and increase standards for PM_{2.5} concentrations in ambient air. A 2023 review further suggested the development of affordable portable technologies for measuring individual exposures; an increased focus on the size, source, composition, and location-specific effects of particulate matter; and the development of standards for smaller size particulates (PM_{1}) and specific toxic constituents of pollution.

Air quality is governed through a mixture of both voluntary and mandatory policy instruments, including air quality guidelines, building standards, and environmental regulations. Air quality guidelines (e.g. WHO Air Quality Guidelines) provide science and health-based recommendations that connect scientific evidence and policy, but are generally non-binding and do not provide mechanisms for monitoring and enforcement. Building standards are generally technical specifications, developed by organizations such as ASHRAE or ISO. These tend to be voluntary unless they are incorporated into law. Environmental regulations are legally enforceable rules issued by regulatory agencies. These authoritative tools can be slow to reflect changes in scientific evidence and technological developments. Legislation establishes the legal authority for developing and enforcing regulations but typically does not determine scientific exposure thresholds or define technical requirements. The development of evidence-based standards and guidelines by broad groups of stakeholders can define clear regulatory pathways as precursors to formal regulation.

The WHO Air Quality Guidelines establish benchmarks for concentration levels of key pollutants such as PM_{2.5}, NO_{2}, CO, and O_{3}_{,} providing a worldwide foundation for national air quality (IAQ) standards. Policies enacted by governments to deal with outdoor air quality tend to be either incentive policies (e.g. free public transportation to minimize use of private cars), supportive policies (e.g. subsidies for use of specific household fuels), or punitive policies (e.g. tolls for cars). In most cases where air pollution control measures have been enacted, outcomes have been positive.

Historically, outdoor or ambient air pollution has received more attention than the indoor environment in environmental health discourse. However, in low- and middle-income countries, household sources of air pollution are a major concern. In addition, from 80% to 90% of populations in high-income countries spend the much of their time indoors. As of 2021, only 7% of countries had any form of standards for indoor air quality (IAQ). The European Union is relatively active in research and policy, and 21 of its countries passed legislation or guidelines as of 2025. International experts have called for the introduction of national IAQ standards, and for the adoption of ventilation rates that significantly exceed current standards. A 2022 Lancet Commission proposed that standards for indoor ventilation rates follow a “Good, Better, Best” strategy of setting thresholds well above the absolute minimum. A unified framework for Global Open Indoor Air Quality Standards (GO IAQS) was proposed in 2026.

In the United States, ambient air quality management is a joint responsibility of the federal and state governments as outlined in the US Clean Air Act and its amendments. Following these initiatives, concentrations of particulate matter (PM_{2.5}) in the United States fell by about 40% between 2000 and 2016. Since then, the U.S.'s overall air quality has worsened. As of 2019, scientists identified a group of combustion-related air pollutants including particulate matter (PM_{2.5}), nitrogen dioxide, polycyclic aromatic hydrocarbons (PAHs), and black carbon as critical targets for US air pollution policy.

Project TENDR (Targeting Environmental Neurodevelopmental Risks) recommended (1) that the US Environmental Protection Agency (EPA) consider the effects of air pollutants on neurodevelopment when setting standards and making cost-benefit assessments of health outcomes (2) strengthen and enforce federal fuel efficiency standards (3) advance clean energy policies to reduce reliance on fossil fuels (4) focus on reducing emissions of combustion-related pollutants from large sources near residential areas, such as major roadways, ports, and rail yards (5) restrict permitting of new sources of combustion-related air pollutants near residential areas (6) increase air monitoring near locations where children spend time such as schools and playgrounds (7) increase research into mitigation and (8) increase research into health effects of ultrafine particles.

The United States also follows building energy efficiency codes that relate to indoor air quality: the International Energy Conservation Code (IECC) and ANSI/ASHRAE/IES Standard 90.1. The organizations developing these standards are private associations, but the standards are adopted and given formal legal status at the federal and state levels.

In the UK, the 2020 Lancet Commission on dementia identified air pollution as a new modifiable risk factor for dementia. The 2024 Lancet Commission estimated that 45% of dementia cases worldwide could be prevented by addressing 14 modifiable risk factors. Of those factors, air pollution (including particulate matter, heavy metals, pesticides, PFAS, and microplastics) was estimated to account for approximately 9% of the potentially preventable global cases of dementia.

In 2022, an Expert Consensus Task Force for China proposed three sets of recommendations relating to air pollution and PM_{2.5}:

1. For the prevention and control of ambient PM_{2.5} pollution: "to continuously strengthen the widespread use and efficient development of clean energy; to further promote industrial upgrading; to focus on the control of transportation pollution; to keep improving the modernization system of air pollution control; to formulate and refine relevant standards for air quality gradually; and to estimate the effects and health benefits after the implementation of clean air actions, and relevant policies."
2. For the protection of public health: "to strengthen the release of air pollution monitoring and relevant information; to strengthen awareness of air pollution hazards; to clarify the guidance and recommendations for protecting population health from air pollution; and to strengthen the health protection of population vulnerable to ambient air pollution."
3. For research on health risks of air pollution: "to strengthen research on air pollutant monitoring technology and monitoring system based on the promotion of accurate exposure assessment; to systematically carry out full-spectrum identification and correlation studies of air pollutants and health effects; to conduct studies on key toxic components and early biomarker inventory of air pollution health effects; to discover the toxicity mechanisms of the key toxic components of air pollutants; to carry out research on population health risk assessment and early warning of combined exposure to air pollutants; and to execute comprehensive studies on the health and economic benefits of pollution and carbon reduction under the national strategies of carbon neutrality and beautiful China."

=== Regulation ===
Regulation of pollutants varies widely depending on the substance and the jurisdictions involved. For example, pesticides that have been linked to Parkinson's disease, such as paraquat, rotenone, and heptachlor, have been banned in many countries but continue to be used in others. In the European Union (EU) and the United Kingdom, paraquat was banned in 2007. The Arab States of the Gulf banned paraquat in 2017. In the United States, paraquat continues to be sold as a “restricted use pesticide”. Restrictions on the use and application of paraquat in some countries have been found to be insufficient in reducing poisoning or suicide mortality. Many countries have taken stronger steps by introducing national and regional bans and phase-outs, which have been effective at reducing paraquat poisoning and deaths.

=== Remediation ===
Contamination of soil with dioxins due to war, pesticide use, and other human activities creates conditions that are extremely toxic and hazardous both to human health and the environment. A variety of physical, chemical, and biological technologies have been suggested for removal of dioxins. Bioremediation technologies such as bioaugmentation, biostimulation, and phytoremediation with plants of a large biomass can encourage the growth of native microbial communities and remove persistent organic compounds from contaminated soil.

== See also ==
- Effects of climate change on mental health
- Psychological impact of climate change

Pollutants

- Ash | Soot
- Carbon disulfide
- Cement | Concrete | Construction aggregate
- Electronic waste
- Joss paper
- Neurotoxin
- Paint
- Pesticide | Paraquat | Rotenone
- Polychlorinated biphenyls
- Slag
- Solvent | Toluene | Trichloroethylene
- Volatile organic compound

Sources

- Black market#Fuel | Fuel dye#Fuel laundering
- Heavy industry
- Oil extraction | Oil refinery
- Metalworking
- Mining | Smelting
- Recycling#Health and environmental impact
- Renovation | DIY (home improvement)
- Roadworks
- Open burning of waste | Slash-and-burn | Stubble burning
- Welding
- Wildfire

Others

- ATSDR
- Epigenetics
- Exposome
- Fibrosis
- Lead–crime hypothesis
- Light pollution
- List of cancer clusters
- Manganism
- Multiple chemical sensitivity
- Power tool | Heavy machinery
- Substance-induced psychosis
- World Trade Center lung
