= Lilian Calderón-Garcidueñas =

Mexican toxicologist and neuropathologist

- Education: National Autonomous University of Mexico, Veracruzana University, University of North Carolina at Chapel Hill, University of Toronto
- Employers: Universidad Autónoma de Piedras Negras; Universidad del Valle de México; University of Montana
- Website: umimpact.umt.edu/en/persons/lilian-calderon-garciduenas/

Lilian Calderón-Garcidueñas is a Mexican toxicologist and neuropathologist who studies air pollution and its effects on the developing brain. Calderón-Garcidueñas is a professor of pharmaceutical and biomedical sciences at the University of Montana, with an external position at Universidad Autónoma de Piedras Negras in Piedras Negras, Coahuila, Mexico. She is also affiliated with the Universidad del Valle de México in Mexico City and the Instituto Nacional de Pediatria in Mexico City.

Calderón-Garcidueñas has made important contributions to the body of research that connects polluted air with neurodevelopmental and neurodegenerative disorders. Her work showing that young children's nervous systems are negatively affected by pollution has been described as "pioneering" and "ground-breaking". She and her team have documented neuropathological changes in the brains of children and young adults in highly polluted Mexico City, and demonstrated that some changes are similar to those found in Alzheimer's disease. Her work "is at the leading edge of showing that air pollution goes directly into the brain through the air we breathe, and has serious impacts."

== Early life and education ==
Lilian Calderón-Garcidueñas grew up in a small town to the east of Mexico City, near the Gulf of Mexico, where her parents were physicians. She entered medical school at 15 and graduated at 20 from the Universidad Nacional Autonoma de Mexico (UNAM). She trained as a resident in pathology and neuropathology at the University of Toronto from 1975-1981, and received American Board certification in Anatomical Pathology and Neuropathology in 1981. She held a fellowship at Harvard University before going to Northwestern University as an assistant professor.

Her first paper on the effects of air pollution in Mexico was published by the American Journal of Pathology in 1992, in which she is credited as working with the Department of Pathology at the National University of Mexico (UNAM). During the 1990s she is also credited as working with the Instituto Nacional de Pediatria in Mexico City. In addition, she earned Bachelor's degrees in English Literature and Biology from Universidad Veracruzana and a Master's degree in Comparative Literature from UNAM in 1997.

From 1997-2001, Calderón-Garcidueñas studied clinical environmental research at the University of North Carolina at Chapel Hill, receiving her Doctorate in Toxicology in 2001. This was followed by a three year postdoctoral fellowship in Environmental Pathology in the Center for Environmental Health and Susceptibility (CEHS) led by James Swenberg. In 2005, Calderón-Garcidueñas joined the University of Montana where she heads the Environmental Neuroprevention Laboratory.

== Research ==
Harmful effects of air pollution on the respiratory and circulatory systems are well documented. The effects of pollution on the periphery and central nervous system (CNS) have been more recently studied. Calderón-Garcidueñas has made important contributions to the growing body of evidence that links air pollution to problems in neurodegeneration and mental health. Presence and buildup of toxic pollutants can lead to effects on the brain including neurotoxicity, central nervous system damage, developmental delays, changes in cognitive function and neurodegenerative diseases.

In 1992, Mexico City was found to be the most polluted city in the world by the World Health Organization. Despite improvements in quality, the city's daily ozone and particulate matter levels remain higher than the standards of the U.S. Environmental Protection Agency (EPA). In Mexico many people are moving into larger cities, often living in areas which are increasingly overcrowded and polluted. Air pollution in Mexico City is estimated to negatively affect at least 21.7 million people living in the city's metropolitan area.

In a series of studies Calderón-Garcidueñas and her colleagues have examined the association of high levels of air pollution with a wide variety of molecular, structural, and cognitive brain outcomes in dogs, children and young adults. In 2002 Calderón-Garcidueñas and her colleagues reported pioneering research linking air pollution to harmful effects on brain health. Calderón-Garcidueñas examined brain tissue from 40 street dogs, some from Mexico City and others from Tlaxcala, a rural area nearby with cleaner air. The brains of city dogs showed indicators of neurodegeneration, while the brains of rural dogs were more healthy.

Calderón-Garcidueñas has since shown that young children's nervous systems are negatively affected by pollution, raising concerns about both children's and adult's health. Using methods such as autopsies and magnetic resonance imaging (MRI), she has compared the brains of people and dogs raised in Mexico City (a location known for high pollution levels) with people and dogs raised in Polotitlán, Mexico (which had acceptable pollution levels according to US National Ambient Air Quality Standards). Children who lived in Mexico City were found to have white matter lesions in the prefrontal area of the brain, and displayed poorer cognitive performance than children from less polluted areas. Children living in polluted areas had significantly higher levels of antibodies and combustion-related metals in serum and cerebrospinal fluid. Autopsies found ultrafine particulate matter in the olfactory bulbs of dogs, children, and young adults who had lived in areas with extreme air pollution. This body of work demonstrated the impact of air pollution and its variation in geographic regions. Her studies showed that air pollution is associated with potential pathological brain outcomes, which begin to affect brain health in childhood.

In 2018, Calderón-Garcidueñas and her colleagues reported that neuropathological changes in children and young adults exposed to high levels of pollution in Mexico City were similar to changes found in Alzheimer's disease. They published results from the autopsies of young Mexico City residents in which they looked for abnormal proteins related to Alzheimer’s development: hyperphosphorylated tau and beta amyloid. The team examined 203 residents, from 11 months to 40 years old. They detected indicators of Alzheimer’s pathology in 99.5% of cases, including babies less than a year old. They concluded that high levels of air pollution put children and young adults at higher risk for the development of Alzheimer’s disease.

Calderón-Garcidueñas has carried out a series of "extensive and pioneering" research studies into the pathology of Alzheimer’s disease, exploring mechanisms involved in inflammation and oxidative stress. She has also examined connections to Parkinson's disease and amyotrophic lateral sclerosis. Her body of work has shown effects of pollutants on processes involving activation of astroglia, proinflammatory cytokines, beta amyloid and tau proteins associated with buildup of Aβ diffuse plaques and hyperphosphorylated tau pre-tangles, Aβ42 immunoreactivity, and interactions with ApoE ɛ4 genes. This research demonstrates that pollution affects processes in the human brain that can lead to neuronal dysfunction.

Calderón-Garcidueñas and her team have shown that children raised in areas with higher pollution levels have worse scores on cognitive measures related to short-term memory, attention, vocabulary, intelligence (IQ), learning, complex reasoning, executive functioning, verbal and working memory, and attention, and inhibitory control. Studies suggest that exposure to air pollutants is associated with decline in cognitive function and the development of dementia as well as Alzheimer’s disease. High levels of air pollution may also put children and young adults at higher risk for suicide.

Calderón-Garcidueñas has worked with other scientists internationally to examine the presence and impact of metals in the body and brain. Calderón Gardidueñas found iron-rich nanoparticles in human hearts in autopsies of people who died between ages 9 and 24. Postmortem tests have also revealed manganese, nickel, and chromium in the brain tissue of people who had lived in polluted areas. With Barbara Maher and others, she has studied the effects of magnetite nanoparticles in the brain, the pathways by which they may reach the brain, and the mechanisms by which exposure may lead to brain injury. Nanoparticles may reach the brain via the olfactory nerves and olfactory bulb or by crossing the blood-brain barrier. Pollutants may increase the blood-brain barrier's permeability. The blood-brain barrier is more permeable in the very young and old, making these two life stages particularly vulnerable to neurological damage. Pollutants may also act indirectly by triggering systemic inflammation elsewhere in the body, causing damage to the brain as a secondary effect.

== Selected publication ==
- Calderón-Garcidueñas, L; Azzarelli, B; Acuna, H; Garcia, R; Gambling, TM; Osnaya, N; Monroy, S; DEL Tizapantzi, MR; Carson, JL; Villarreal-Calderon, A; Rewcastle, B (2002). "Air pollution and brain damage". Toxicologic Pathology. 30 (3): 373–389. doi:10.1080/01926230252929954. PMID 12051555.
- Calderón-Garcidueñas, L; Solt, AC; Henríquez-Roldán, C; Torres-Jardón, R; Nuse, B; Herritt, L; Villarreal-Calderón, R; Osnaya, N; Stone, I; García, R; Brooks, DM; González-Maciel, A; Reynoso-Robles, R; Delgado-Chávez, R; Reed, W (February 2008). "Long-term air pollution exposure is associated with neuroinflammation, an altered innate immune response, disruption of the blood-brain barrier, ultrafine particulate deposition, and accumulation of amyloid beta-42 and alpha-synuclein in children and young adults". Toxicologic Pathology. 36 (2): 289–310. doi:10.1177/0192623307313011. PMID 18349428.
- Calderón-Garcidueñas, L; Mora-Tiscareño, A; Ontiveros, E; Gómez-Garza, G; Barragán-Mejía, G; Broadway, J; Chapman, S; Valencia-Salazar, G; Jewells, V; Maronpot, RR; Henríquez-Roldán, C; Pérez-Guillé, B; Torres-Jardón, R; Herrit, L; Brooks, D; Osnaya-Brizuela, N; Monroy, ME; González-Maciel, A; Reynoso-Robles, R; Villarreal-Calderon, R; Solt, AC; Engle, RW (November 2008). "Air pollution, cognitive deficits and brain abnormalities: a pilot study with children and dogs". Brain and Cognition. 68 (2): 117–127. doi:10.1016/j.bandc.2008.04.008. PMID 18550243.
- Block, ML; Calderón-Garcidueñas, L; Potter, D (September 2009). "Air pollution: mechanisms of neuroinflammation and CNS disease". Trends in Neurosciences. 32 (9): 506–516. doi:10.1016/j.tins.2009.05.009. PMC 2743793. PMID 19716187.
- Calderón-Garcidueñas, L; Franco-Lira, M; Henríquez-Roldán, C; Osnaya, N; González-Maciel, A; Reynoso-Robles, R; Villarreal-Calderon, R; Herritt, L; Brooks, D; Keefe, S; Palacios-Moreno, J; Villarreal-Calderon, R; Torres-Jardón, R; Medina-Cortina, H; Delgado-Chávez, R; Aiello-Mora, M; Maronpot, RR; Doty, RL (January 2010). "Urban air pollution: influences on olfactory function and pathology in exposed children and young adults". Experimental and Toxicologic Pathology: Official Journal of the Gesellschaft Fur Toxikologische Pathologie. 62 (1): 91–102. doi:10.1016/j.etp.2009.02.117. PMC 2832203. PMID 19297138.
- Calderón-Garcidueñas, L; Engle, R; Mora-Tiscareño, A; Styner, M; Gómez-Garza, G; Zhu, H; Jewells, V; Torres-Jardón, R; Romero, L; Monroy-Acosta, ME; Bryant, C; González-González, LO; Medina-Cortina, H; D'Angiulli, A (December 2011). "Exposure to severe urban air pollution influences cognitive outcomes, brain volume and systemic inflammation in clinically healthy children". Brain and Cognition. 77 (3): 345–355. doi:10.1016/j.bandc.2011.09.006. PMID 22032805.
- Calderón-Garcidueñas, L; Kavanaugh, M; Block, M; D'Angiulli, A; Delgado-Chávez, R; Torres-Jardón, R; González-Maciel, A; Reynoso-Robles, R; Osnaya, N; Villarreal-Calderon, R; Guo, R; Hua, Z; Zhu, H; Perry, G; Diaz, P (2012). "Neuroinflammation, hyperphosphorylated tau, diffuse amyloid plaques, and down-regulation of the cellular prion protein in air pollution exposed children and young adults". Journal of Alzheimer's disease: JAD. 28 (1): 93–107. doi:10.3233/JAD-2011-110722. PMID 21955814.
- Calderón-Garcidueñas, L; Kulesza, RJ; Doty, RL; D'Angiulli, A; Torres-Jardón, R (February 2015). "Megacities air pollution problems: Mexico City Metropolitan Area critical issues on the central nervous system pediatric impact". Environmental Research. 137: 157–169. doi:10.1016/j.envres.2014.12.012. PMID 25543546.
- Maher, B.A.; Ahmed, I.A.; Karloukovski, V.; MacLaren, D.A.; Foulds, P.G.; Allsop, D.; Mann, D.M.; Torres-Jardón, R.; Calderon-Garciduenas, L. (2016). "Magnetite pollution nanoparticles in the human brain". Proceedings of the National Academy of Sciences. 113 (39): 10797–10801. Bibcode:2016PNAS..11310797M. doi:10.1073/pnas.1605941113. PMC 5047173. PMID 27601646.
- Calderón-Garcidueñas, L; Mukherjee, PS; Waniek, K; Holzer, M; Chao, CK; Thompson, C; Ruiz-Ramos, R; Calderón-Garcidueñas, A; Franco-Lira, M; Reynoso-Robles, R; Gónzalez-Maciel, A; Lachmann, I (2018). "Non-Phosphorylated Tau in Cerebrospinal Fluid is a Marker of Alzheimer's Disease Continuum in Young Urbanites Exposed to Air Pollution". Journal of Alzheimer's disease: JAD. 66 (4): 1437–1451. doi:10.3233/JAD-180853. PMID 30412505.
- Calderón-Garcidueñas, L; Gónzalez-Maciel, A; Reynoso-Robles, R; Delgado-Chávez, R; Mukherjee, PS; Kulesza, RJ; Torres-Jardón, R; Ávila-Ramírez, J; Villarreal-Ríos, R (July 2018). "Hallmarks of Alzheimer disease are evolving relentlessly in Metropolitan Mexico City infants, children and young adults. APOE4 carriers have higher suicide risk and higher odds of reaching NFT stage V at ≤ 40 years of age". Environmental Research. 164: 475–487. doi:10.1016/j.envres.2018.03.023. PMID 29587223.
- Calderón-Garcidueñas, L; González-Maciel, A; Mukherjee, PS; Reynoso-Robles, R; Pérez-Guillé, B; Gayosso-Chávez, C; Torres-Jardón, R; Cross, JV; Ahmed, IAM; Karloukovski, VV; Maher, BA (September 2019). "Combustion- and friction-derived magnetic air pollution nanoparticles in human hearts". Environmental Research. 176: 108567. doi:10.1016/j.envres.2019.108567. PMID 31344533.
- Calderón-Garcidueñas, L; Herrera-Soto, A; Jury, N; Maher, BA; González-Maciel, A; Reynoso-Robles, R; Ruiz-Rudolph, P; van Zundert, B; Varela-Nallar, L (April 2020). "Reduced repressive epigenetic marks, increased DNA damage and Alzheimer's disease hallmarks in the brain of humans and mice exposed to particulate urban air pollution". Environmental Research. 183: 109226. doi:10.1016/j.envres.2020.109226. PMID 32045727.
