= Air quality guideline =

World Health Organization guideline

The World Health Organization guidelines were most recently updated in 2021. The guidelines offer guidance about these air pollutants: particulate matter (PM), ozone (O_{3}), nitrogen dioxide (NO_{2}), sulfur dioxide (SO_{2}) and carbon monoxide (CO). The WHO first released the air quality guidelines in 1987, then updated them in 1997. The reports provide guidelines intending to give guidelines to reduce the health effects of air pollution.

The guidelines stipulate that PM_{2.5} should not exceed 5 μg/m^{3} annual mean, or 15 μg/m^{3} 24-hour mean; and that PM_{10} should not exceed 15 μg/m^{3} annual mean, or 45 μg/m^{3} 24-hour mean. For ozone (O_{3}), the guidelines suggest values no higher than 100 μg/m^{3} for an 8-hour mean and 60 μg/m^{3} peak season mean. For nitrogen dioxide (NO_{2}), the guidelines set 10 μg/m^{3} for the annual mean or 25 μg/m^{3} for a 24-hours mean. For sulfur dioxide (SO_{2}), the guidelines stipulate concentrations not exceeding 40 μg/m^{3} 24-hour mean. For carbon monoxide concentrations not exceeding 4 mg/m^{3} 24-hour mean.

Up to 30 % of Europeans living in cities are exposed to air pollutant levels exceeding EU air quality standards. Around 98 % of Europeans living in cities are exposed to levels of air pollutants deemed damaging to health by the World Health Organization's more stringent guidelines even before they were adjusted to latest scientific data to be mostly more stringent.

In terms of health effects, the guideline states that PM_{2.5} concentration of 10 is the lowest level at which total, cardiopulmonary and lung cancer mortality have been shown to increase with more than 95% confidence in response to long-term exposure to PM_{2.5}.

Along with cardiopulmonary and lung cancer deaths, the chances of which an individual increases their risk of being diagnosed with these is highly coordinated to fine particulate matter and sulfur dioxide-related pollution. A 2002 study found that "Each 10 μg/m^{3} elevation in fine particulate air pollution was associated with approximately a 4%, 6% and 8% increased risk of all-cause, cardiopulmonary, and lung cancer mortality, respectively." A 2021 study found that outdoor air pollution is associated with substantially increased mortality "even at low pollution levels below the current European and North American standards and WHO guideline values". Shortly afterwards, on 22 September 2021, for the first time since 2005, the WHO, after a systematic review of the accumulated evidence, adjusted their air quality guidelines whose adherence "could save millions of lives, protect against future diseases and help meet climate goals".

On 4 April 2022 the WHO released their report based on the new guidelines. Pollutants for which new guidelines for annual mean have been set are PM_{2.5}, with guideline value half the previous one, PM_{10}, which is decreased by 25%, and that for nitrogen dioxide (NO_{2}), which is four times lower than the previous guideline.

== See also ==
- Air pollution
- List of causes of death by rate § Air pollution
- List of most-polluted cities by particulate matter concentration
