= History of the Cross Border Xpress =

The 2015 opening of the Cross Border Xpress terminal and bridge to Tijuana International Airport, also referred to as the Tijuana Cross-border Terminal and the Puerta de las Californias, was preceded by a quarter century of negotiations that were impacted by political, economic and security issues.

Following Mexico's Debt Crisis and foreign loan renegotiations in the 1980s, in 1989, President Carlos Salinas de Gortari began to implement a massive privatization program to facilitate both the general and regional development of Mexico. Key to that program was the modernization of all transportation networks. Lacking funds and acknowledging the symbiotic relationship between commerce and transportation, "co-investments" were initiated to attract both domestic and foreign capital.

== 1989: Mexicana de Aviación–Nieders proposal ==
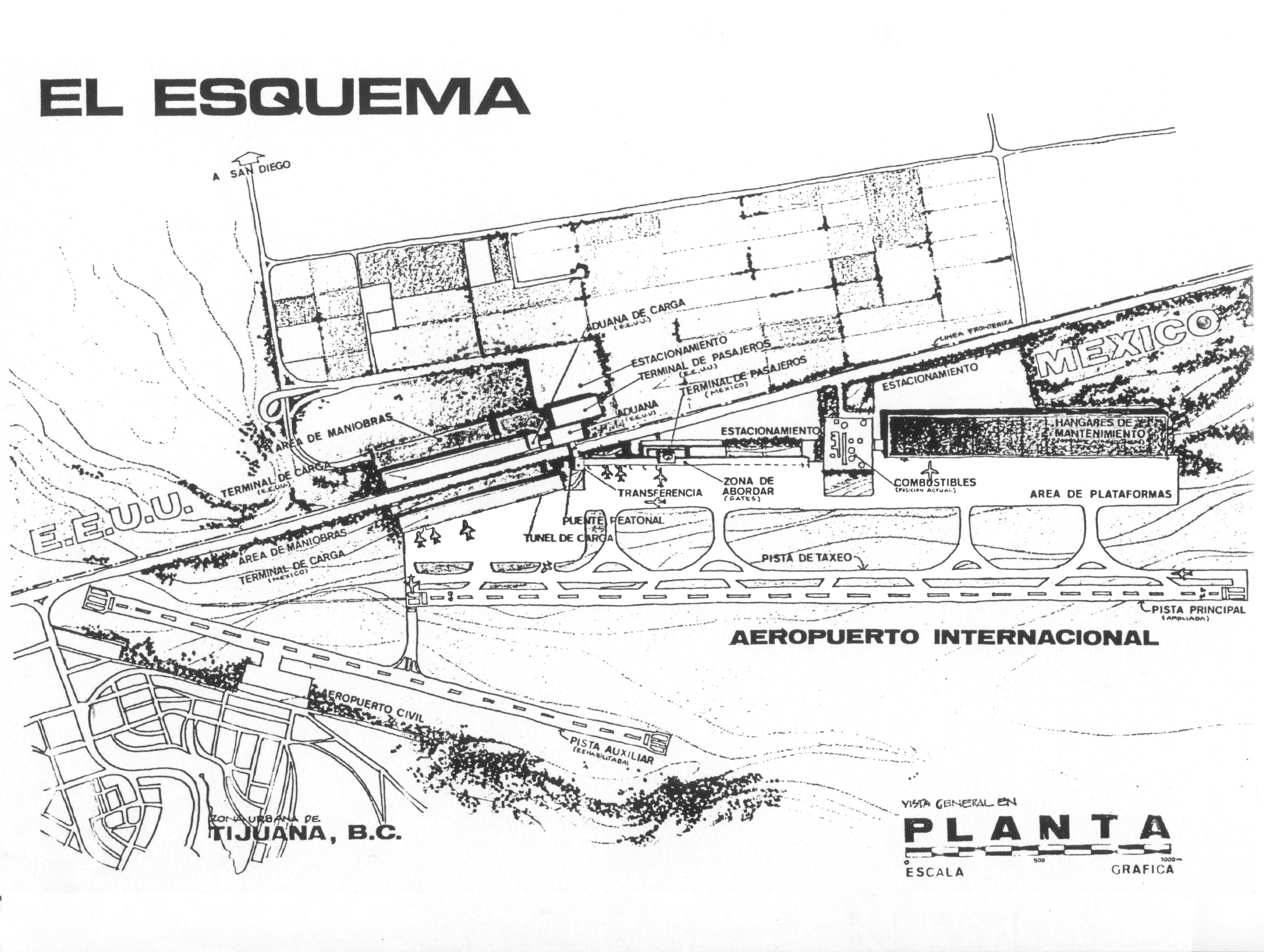
Image 1: Mexicana de Aviación-Nieders cross-border terminal proposal, 1990

The first airport "co-investment" occurred in Tijuana in 1989. A 10-year concession was issued to Ruber, S.A. de C.V. to develop the commercial areas of the Tijuana airport's two passenger terminals. The Ruber concession was followed by another issued to Constructora Comar, S.A. de C.V. to build a multi-level airport parking structure. In 1990, a third concession was issued at the Tijuana airport when an agreement was signed in Hong Kong between Mexico's Minister of Commerce, Jaime Serra Puche, Danbridge, Ltd. and Tijuana businessman Carlos Bustamante Anchondo for the construction of an aircraft maintenance center specializing in Boeing 747s known as Matrix, S.A. de C.V. The Matrix investment was fueled by uncertainty created over the transfer of sovereignty over Hong Kong from British rule to the People's Republic of China. The Matrix installation was to base and service part of Cathay Pacific's fleet of 747s.

In June 1989, the concept of a cross-border terminal for the Tijuana airport was presented by Ralph Nieders to Isidoro Rodríguez Ruiz, president of Mexico's National Chamber of Transportation and Communications (Cámara Nacional de Transportes y Comunicaciones). Through Isidoro Rodriguez Ruiz, in October 1989, a formal proposal for a cross-border passenger terminal was made to Ing. Guillermo Martinez Garcia, chairman (Director General) of Mexicana de Aviación, S.A. de C.V. in Mexico City by Ralph Nieders of Malcolm and Associates. Isidoro Rodriguez Ruiz and Guillermo Martinez Garcia then presented the concept to Andrés Caso Lombardo, Secretary of the Ministry of Communications and Transportation, (Secretaria de Communicaciones y Transportes– SCT) and Gustavo Patiño Guerrero, Under-Secretary of the SCT. Mexicana de Aviación had been privatized and was in negotiations with KLM (Royal Dutch Airlines) on a joint venture to convert the Cancun airport into Mexico's "Atlantic Gateway". With new investors and capital, and attempting to achieve market dominance, the development of a cross-border terminal at the Tijuana airport and creating Mexico's "Pacific Gateway", fitted within Mexicana's strategic planning.

In June 1990, a property known as Martinez Ranch was identified in San Diego/Otay Mesa (parcel number APN 667-050-07) as the crossing site and land negotiations followed with Malcolm and Associates. With support in Mexico City and a tentative agreement with Bennet Greenwald, which had acquired the Martinez Ranch, Ralph Nieders contacted the San Diego Association of Governments (SANDAG) whose plans for a "bi-national airport" had been undermined in November 1989, when the San Diego City council lifted a building moratorium on Otay Mesa. As shown by image 1, to minimize costs and maximize usage, the Mexicana de Aviación cross-border proposal was to use the existing roads and undeveloped land on the U.S. side to build a passenger and light cargo terminals. Through a pedestrian bridge, the U.S. passenger terminal would have connected directly to the Tijuana passenger terminal, while an underground conveyor system would have moved light cargo between U.S.-Mexico custom warehouses to service freight carriers such as United Parcel Service, DHL and FedEx. Supporting the concept for a cross-border terminal was the approval of a Free Trade Zone on Otay Mesa in August 1988. But the Mexicana proposal fell between two competing proposals. The first came from the San Diego Association of Governments (SANDAG) which sought to revive the concept of a binational airport between the Tijuana airport and San Diego’s Brown Field Municipal Airport on Otay Mesa.

== 1990: San Diego Association of Governments (SANDAG) proposal ==
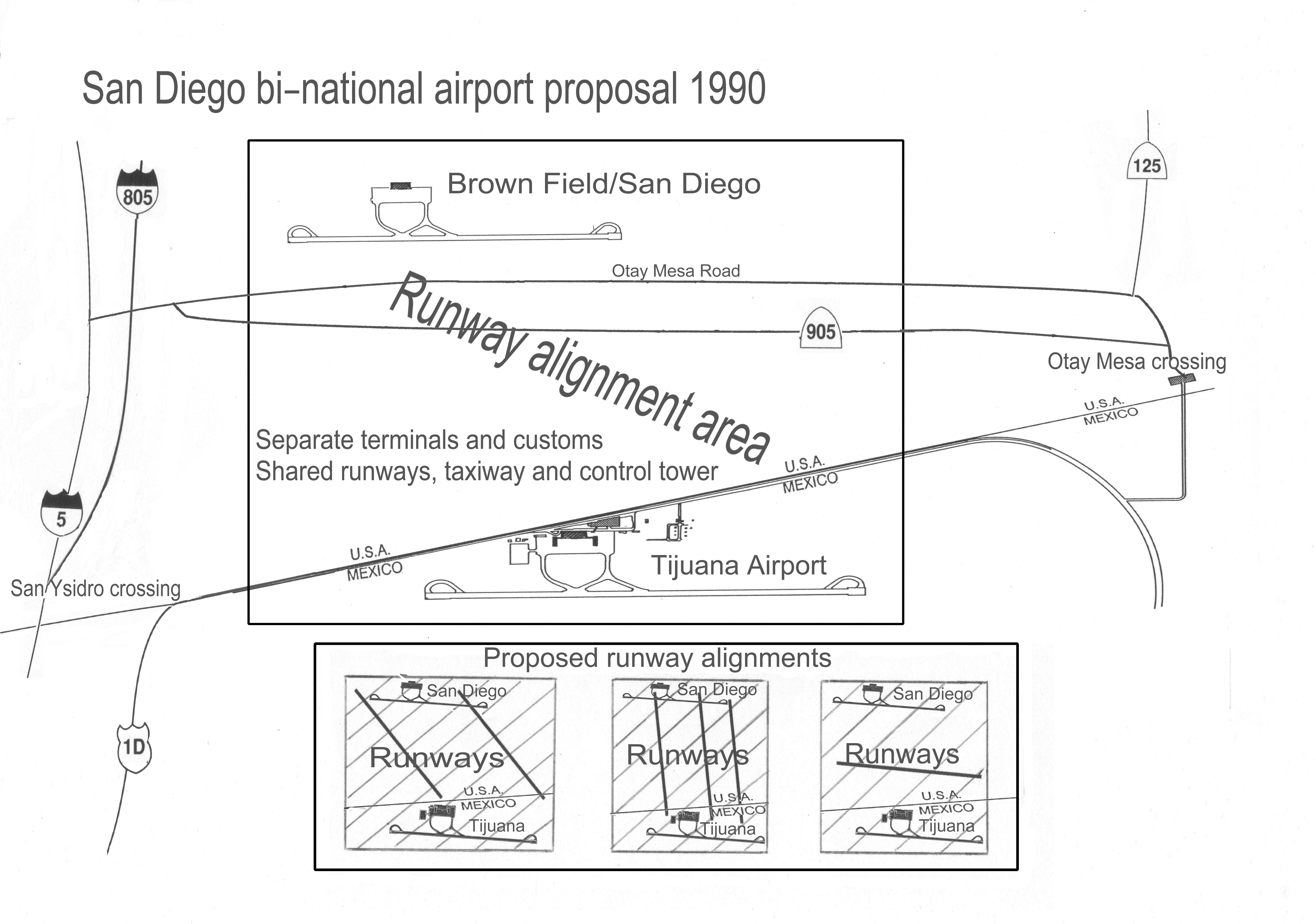
Image 2: SANDAG bi-national airport proposal, 1990

In 1989, seeking to expand regional air capacity and meet future needs, the San Diego Association of Governments (SANDAG) identified two military installations as potential airport development sites: the Marine Corps Recruit Depot to expand the San Diego Airport, and the Naval Air Station (NAS) Miramar to replace the San Diego Airport. On September 18, 1989, in a letter addressed to Ernie Cowan, Chairman of the San Diego Association of Governments, the Under Secretary of the Navy J. Daniel Howard, formally rejected the consideration of either base but "With respect to the Otay Mesa site, while it may affect air operations from the Outlying Field at Imperial Beach (REAM Field), I do not oppose a new commercial airport located there. We will have to work together regarding airspace coordination. I will be pleased to personally assist in your efforts to interface with the Government of Mexico, if SANDAG would find this helpful." SANDAG's effort to create an airport on Otay Mesa, either by expanding the Brown Field Municipal Airport or creating a binational airport with Mexico, were undermined when the San Diego City Council ended the building moratorium prior the conclusion of SANDAG's airport studies.

In 1990, SANDAG again sought to identify a long-term solution to San Diego's air capacity needs and identified Naval Air Station Miramar as a potential airport development site. On June 22, 1990, in a letter addressed to Lois Ewen, Chairperson of the San Diego Association of Governments, the U.S. Secretary of Defense, Dick Cheney, formally opposed "any joint or shared use of NAS Miramar. Moreover, we have no plans to discontinue or relocate aircraft operations from this installation". But then stated, "I fully support the Department of the Navy's offer to assist in the San Diego Association of Government's efforts to interface with the Government of Mexico concerning a regional airport at the proposed Otay Mesa site near the border."

With limited options, on December 4, 1990, a San Diego delegation led by SANDAG traveled to Mexico City to propose the creation of a binational airport with Mexico. In Mexico City, Jack Koerper, special projects director for SANDAG, met with Isidoro Rodríguez Ruiz, president of Mexico's National Chamber of Transportation and Communications and Ralph Nieders of Malcolm and Associates and was notified that Andrés Caso Lombardo, Secretary of the SCT (Ministry of Transportation and Communication) would not be meeting with the San Diego delegation. Andrés Caso Lombardo had indicated his opposition to the creation of a binational airport with San Diego on August 10, 1990, when he met with the U.S. Under-Secretary of Transportation Elaine Chao in Mexico City. On December 5, the San Diego delegation was instead met by Mexico's Under-Secretary of the SCT Gustavo Patiño Guerrero. SANDAG prepared and distributed an 8-page booklet titled "TIJUANA-SAN DIEGO INTERNATIONAL AIRPORT: A unique opportunity to shape the region's economic future." The booklet contained basic support data and as shown by image 2, three possible runway alignments between the Tijuana airport and San Diego’s Brown Field Municipal Airport. Two of the runway alignments would have required the complete relocation of Tijuana's existing passenger terminal and runway. The SCT Under-Secretary Gustavo Patiño had made clear that Mexico would not consider any proposal that would alter the existing Tijuana airport's configuration or impact its operations. On the U.S. side, the SANDAG proposal would also have required the removal of buildings and streets, and the relocation of the main road (Otay Mesa) and a planned freeway (905) feeding the U.S.-Mexico Otay Mesa Port of Entry, (border crossing). Contrary to reports that Mexico had agreed to consider the creation of a binational airport between Tijuana and San Diego, the Under-Secretary of the SCT Gustavo Patiño had instead suggested the development of a cross-border airport terminal, but SANDAG considered the concept too limited for San Diego's regional needs.

Based on the SCT's recommendation to the San Diego delegation to create a cross-border airport terminal rather than a binational airport, on December 12, 1990, Ing. Guillermo Martinez Garcia, chairman (Director General) of Mexicana de Aviación drafted a letter of intent addressed to Ralph Nieders/Malcolm and Associates with the terms and conditions under which Mexicana would acquire property in San Diego to develop a cross-border terminal for the Tijuana airport. An acquisition price of $8 million U.S. dollars had been negotiated for a 62-acre property (Marinez Ranch parcel number APN 667-050-07) on Otay Mesa, San Diego, but as Mexico was unwilling to consider SANDAG's binational airport proposal, SANDAG was equally unwilling to consider the development of a cross-border terminal for the Tijuana airport. Unable to garner support at SANDAG, on January 8, 1991, Ralph Nieders met with San Diego's Deputy Mayor and Councilman Bob Filner and submitted the Mexicana de Aviación letter of intent and the concept rendering/design for a cross-border airport terminal (image 1- Mexicana de Aviación cross-border terminal proposal 1990). In April 1991, Councilman Filner suggested the limited use of the Tijuana airport, but without clear support in San Diego, Mexicana de Aviación had already decided not to pursue the Tijuana cross-border airport terminal project.

== 1991: Aerocharter–Nieders proposal ==
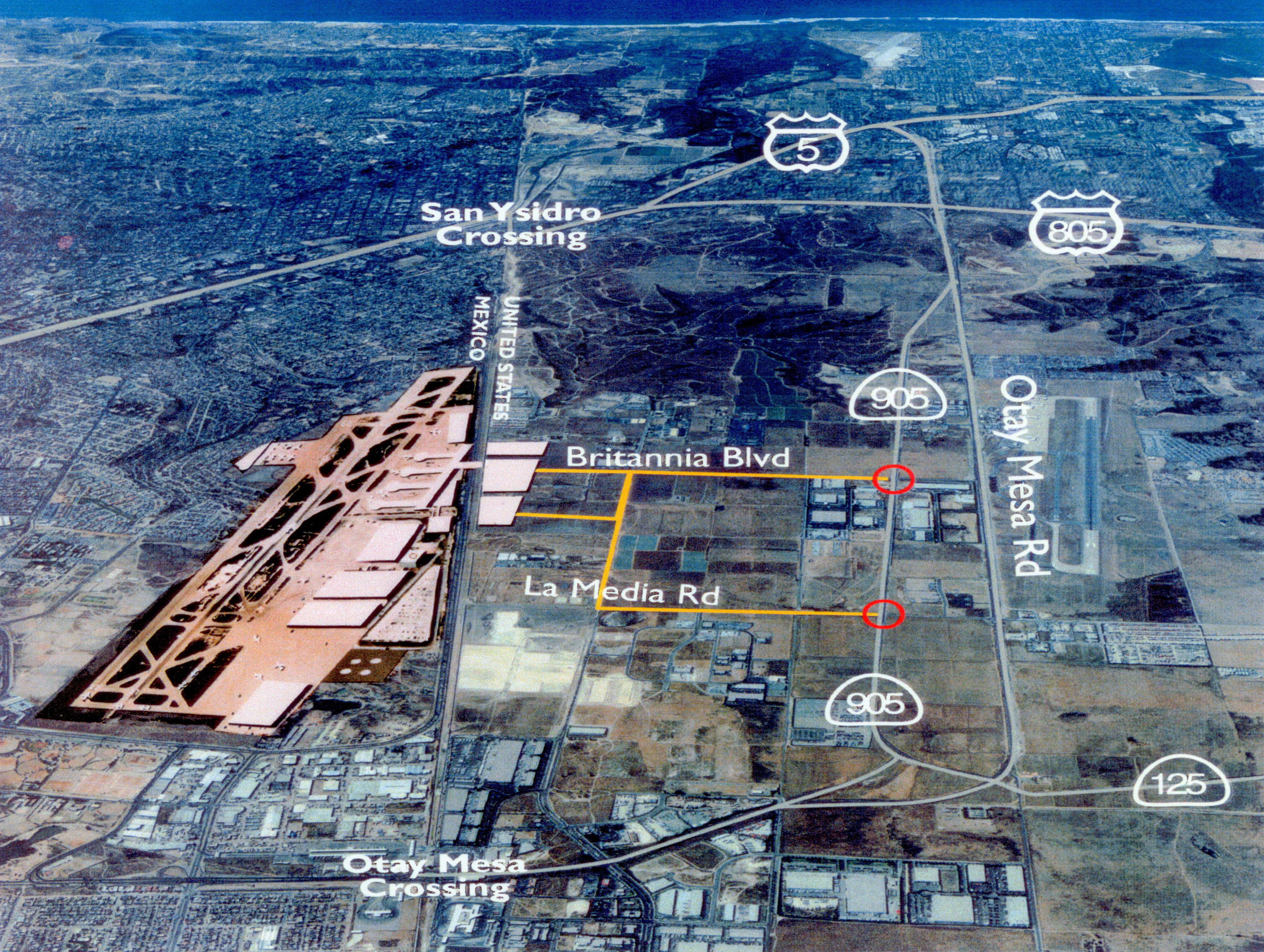
Image 3: Aerocharter-Nieders Tijuana cross-border terminal concept, 1991

As Mexicana de Aviación withdrew, in February 1991, Rodolfo Ramos Ortiz, founder of Aerounión and Aerocharter de México, S.A. de C.V., looking at the Tijuana airport's potential for passenger and cargo operations to Japan and other Pacific destinations, joined Malcolm and Associates efforts in creating a Tijuana cross-border passenger terminal. Rodolfo Ramos had an extensive background in aviation having represented Cubana de Aviación in Mexico City in the 1950s, route development for Western Airlines in San Diego in the 1960s, and then recruited by John R. Beckett and James 'Jim' Harvey of Transamerica Corporation to represent Trans International Airlines (TIA) in Mexico in the 1970s. In the 1960s, TIA pioneered low cost charter passenger flights to Europe and expanded operations into Mexico in the 1970s. In 1973, Rodolfo Ramos created Aerocharter de México, S.A. de C.V. and started air charter operations at the Mexico City International Airport. He also provided ground services to major international charter and cargo companies such as Martinair and Southern Air.

In 1987, Rodolfo Ramos met with Freddie Laker, who had pioneered low-fare commercial transatlantic routes and was the founder of Laker Airways, to develop international commercial/charter flights through Mexico. Following Dennis Conner America’s Cup victory in Australia, Freddie Laker became interested in developing transpacific flights to Southern California. With Mexico’s unused routes and slots (landing rights) at major airports both in Europe and Asia, the Tijuana airport (TIJ) could offer a cost-effective alternative to airports such as LAX (Los Angeles International Airport) and SFO (San Francisco International Airport). The low cost "no frills" Laker Airways business model became the template for carriers such as Southwest Airlines and Ryanair, which also used alternative regional airports to lower landing and operating costs to successfully challenge major air carriers operating from hub airports within the same marketing area, but the major obstacle for operating from the Tijuana airport was how to quickly move passengers across the U.S.-Mexico border. Having established the first Budget Rental Car Agency at the Tijuana airport in the early 1970s, and driving daily between San Diego and the Tijuana airport, Rodolfo Ramos had a clear understanding of the logistical problem in moving passengers across the U.S.-Mexico San Ysidro Port of Entry. At the time, the San Ysidro Port of Entry was the only crossing point between Tijuana and San Diego, and is located 8 miles (13 kilometers) from the Tijuana airport, but the airport itself is located less than 30 yards (27 meters) from the U.S.-Mexico border fence. In 1983, the Otay Mesa Port of Entry located 3 miles (4.8 kilometers) from the Tijuana airport became the second crossing point between San Diego and Tijuana, but initially the crossing was closed daily between 10PM and 6AM and no public transport was available on the U.S. side. While taxis and private buses could shuttle passengers from the Tijuana airport to either crossing, at the border airport passengers would be required to disboard with luggage and mix with local pedestrian traffic to pass U.S. Customs and Immigration inspection. It was during the Freddie Laker negotiations that Rodolfo Ramos and Ralph Nieders first discussed developing a direct passenger entry to the Tijuana airport to facilitate charter operations for the 1988 America's Cup challenge in San Diego. Negotiations between Rodolfo Ramos and Freddie Laker did not lead to a teaming agreement but created interest in the development of the Tijuana airport as a transpacific gateway supported by a cross-border terminal.

In 1989, Rodolfo Ramos was appointed by Mexico's President Carlos Salinas de Gortari to promote the Toluca International Airport as an alternative cargo/passenger destination to the Mexico City International Airport, and in 1990 secured the Toluca-Tijuana-Tokyo route. Rodolfo Ramos also developed ground support facilities at the Cancún International Airport to attract and service passenger charter operations. To better promote the Tijuana airport, both in Mexico and San Diego, a conceptual rendering as shown by image 3 was produced by Ralph Nieders to show the full expansion potential of the Tijuana airport and its incorporation to San Diego’s transportation infrastructure through a cross-border passenger terminal. In April, 1991, Rodolfo Ramos and Ralph Nieders met with San Diego City Councilman Ron Roberts, who presented an alternative configuration to the SANDAG "binational" airport proposal and provided Rodolfo Ramos with a conceptual photograph of a joint Tijuana/San Diego airport known as TwinPorts as shown by image 4.

== 1991: TwinPorts proposal ==
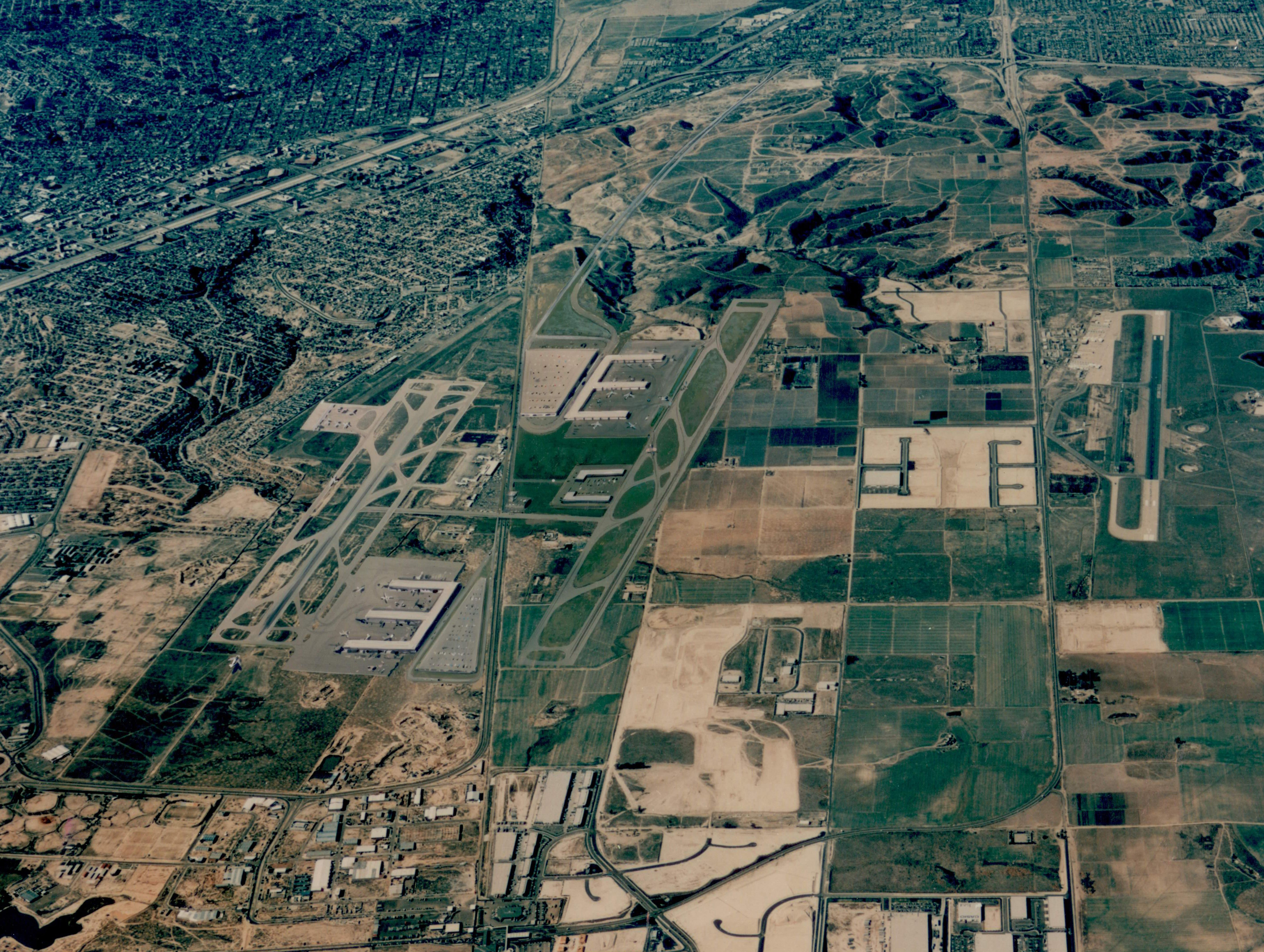
Image 4: San Diego TwinPorts rendering along U.S-Mexico border, 1991

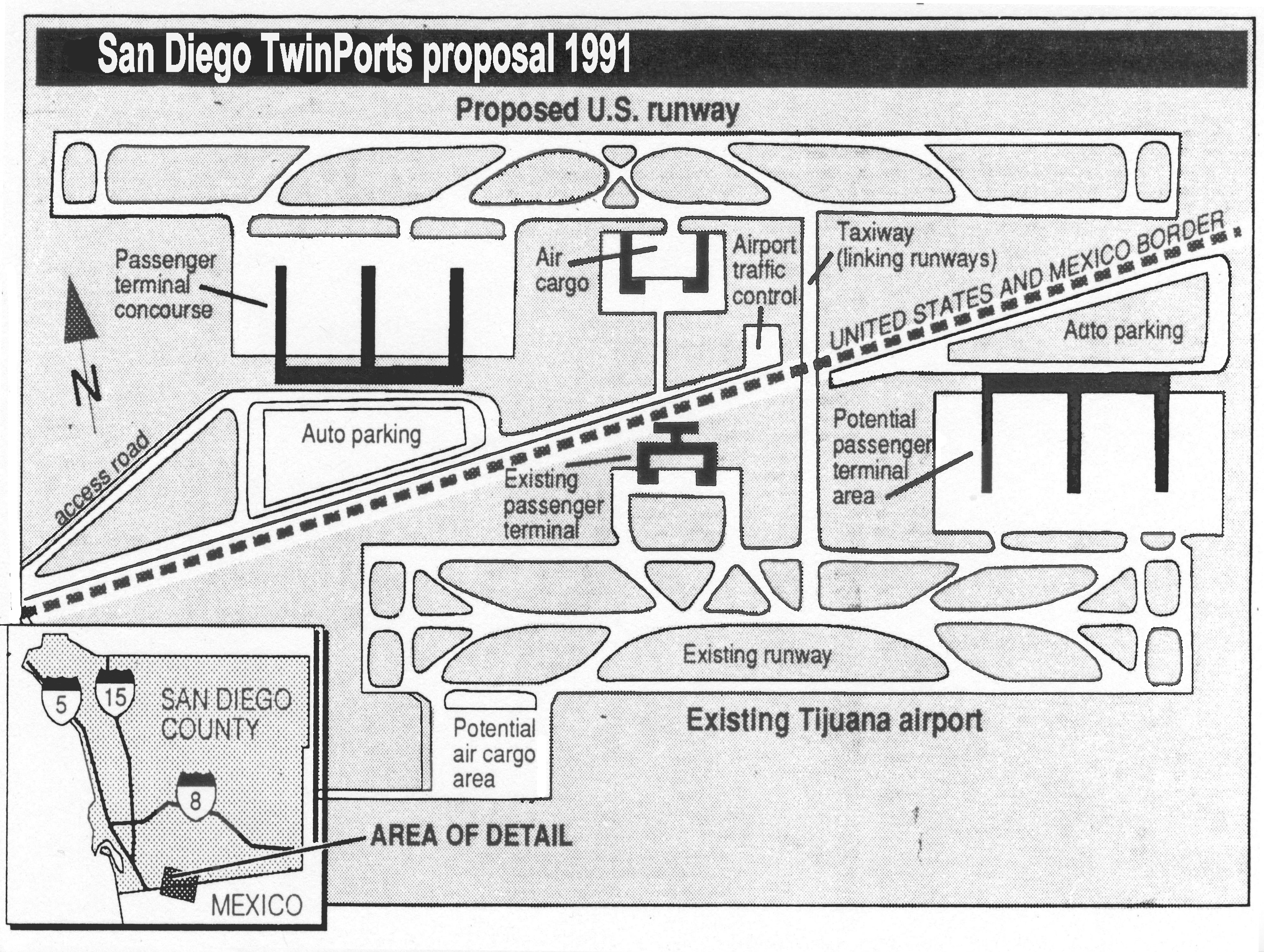
Image 5: San Diego TwinPorts airport proposal, 1991

The term "TwinPorts" was used to describe the concept and replace the SANDAG descriptor "binational airport". Rodolfo Ramos personally delivered the TwinPorts artist's rendering (image 4) to President Salinas and scheduled a meeting in Mexico City for a San Diego delegation. On May 1, 1991, San Diego City Councilman Ron Roberts officially announced an alternative to SANDAG's binational airport proposal that came to be known as TwinPorts. On May 29, 1991, President Salinas de Gortari met with a San Diego delegation headed by Mayor Maureen O'Conner in Mexico City and an agreement was reached to create a joint Mexico/San Diego airport study work group. On June 2, 1991, Rodolfo Ramos arrived in San Diego to meet with City officials to help prepare for the joint Mexico-San Diego study group. En route, he was seriously injured in a car accident and the meetings were cancelled.

As shown by image 5, the TwinPorts concept would have retained the Tijuana airport's existing configuration but did not include a cross-border passenger terminal. Instead it used a cross-border aircraft taxiway which would have allowed aircraft to cross the U.S.–Mexico border to share runways between the two airports and service their respective passenger and cargo terminals, which was similar both in function and operation to SANDAG's binational proposal. The combined Tijuana/San Diego footprint would have created a 4,000 acres (1,600 hectares) airport with a minimum runway separation of 4,300 feet (1.3 kilometers) to allow for simultaneous aircraft operations between the two airports. It would have replaced the existing 480 acres (190 hectares) San Diego International Airport (Lindbergh Field).

As with the San Diego airport, the Tijuana International Airport at 1,100 acres (450 hectares) lacked the space to build parallel runways with a 4,300-foot (1.3 kilometer) separation to allow for simultaneous aircraft operations. As a 1,200-foot runway separation requires a 3-minute delay between departures to protect lighter aircraft from wake turbulence created by heavy jets such as the Boeing 747 and 767, Airbus A300, DC-10, MD-11 and L1011, a runway separation of 2,500 feet (760 meters) is recommended to allow for simultaneous VFR operations (Visual Flight Rules) of all type aircraft. The Tijuana airport's access roads and terminal configuration also lacked the capacity to move a high volume of departure, arrival and interconnecting passengers to support the next generation of super-jumbo jets being designed at the time (the Boeing 747-400 stretch version and the Airbus A380). The Tijuana airport was further limited by a single 09 ILS (instrument landing system) runway approach which is directly over the Naval Outlying Landing Field Imperial Beach, a U.S. Naval helicopter training base. Air operations are also impacted by general aviation air traffic from San Diego's Brown Field Municipal Airport on Otay Mesa, which limits the Tijuana airport's 09 runway and ILS capacity as air traffic must be coordinated and shared between three air fields with conflicting missions and aircraft sizes: the U.S. Navy (helicopter training operations), Brown Field (general aviation), and Tijuana (commercial flights).

== 1991: Aeropuertos y Servicios Auxiliares (ASA) proposal ==
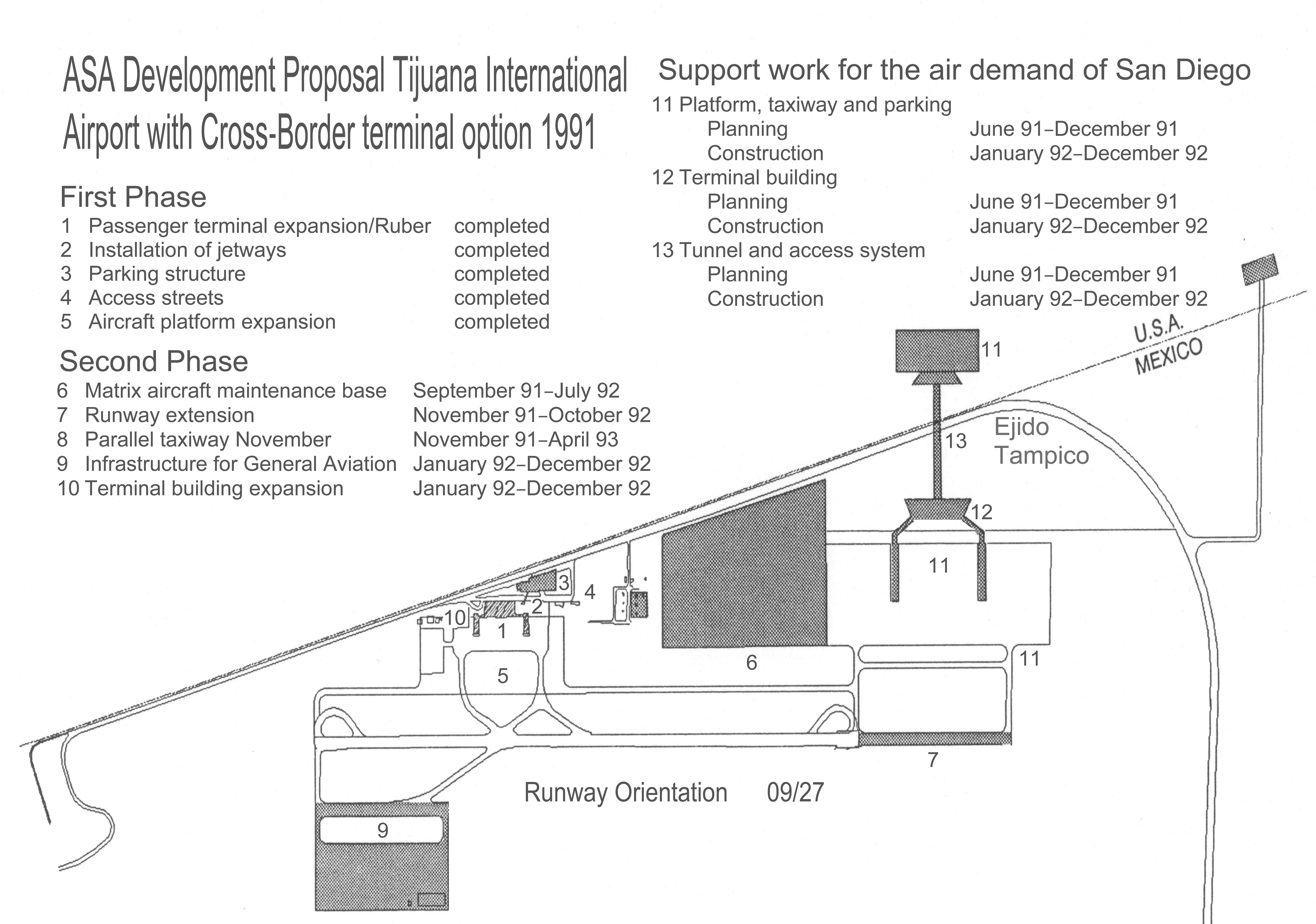
Image 6: ASA Tijuana airport development plan with separate international and cross-border terminals, 1991

As San Diego began to promote its TwinPorts concept, in May, 1991, the Construction and Maintenance Branch (Subdirección de Construcción y Conservación) of Mexico’s airport authority Aeropuertos y Servicios Auxiliares (ASA) prepared a 10-page English-language booklet titled DEVELOPMENT OF THE AIRPORT– TIJUANA INTERNATIONAL AIRPORT, B.C. (DESARROLLO DEL AEROPUERT0– AEROPUERTO INTERNACIONAL DE TIJUANA, B.C.). It was followed by a 10-page Resumen Ejecutivo (Executive Summary) dated July 16, 1991 and only submitted in Spanish titled PROPUESTA PARA OFRECER SERVICOS A LA DEMANDA EXECENTE DE LA CD. DE SAN DIEGO (PROPOSAL TO OFFER SERVICES TO THE EXCESS DEMAND OF THE CITY OF SAN DIEGO) which was presented in conjunction with the ASA booklet prepared in May 1991, to San Diego during the first San Diego-Mexico airport work session in July, 1991. Similar to SANDAG, both the ASA booklet and Executive Summary contained basic information on operations and benefits but it also showed specific development designs, a projected timeline (PROGRAMA DE TRABAJO) and a cost estimate of 322.4 million U.S. dollars to service San Diego's air capacity needs.

As shown by image 6, the ASA proposal was based on creating an international passenger terminal totally separate from the existing Tijuana passenger terminal and east of the Matrix aircraft maintenance center which was similar to the TwinPorts proposal (image 5). The difference between the ASA and TwinPorts proposals laid in the fact that ASA opposed north side runways on Otay Mesa and connecting the Tijuana and San Diego airports through a cross-border aircraft taxiway to service their respective terminals. While the Tijuana airport's ILS (Instrument Landing System) 09 approach required the use of U.S. airspace and coordinating operations with Brown Field Municipal Airport on Otay Mesa and the U.S. Naval Outlying Landing Field Imperial Beach, ASA opposed any San Diego airport development that would require the use of Mexican airspace. Instead, ASA proposed a 387,000 sq.ft. (36,000 square meters) Tijuana international terminal to be built on the disputed former Ejido Tampico, a 79 hectares (200 acres) parcel that communal farmers/ejidatarios had retaken by force that would have been linked to San Diego through a bridge/tunnel connected directly to a U.S. 258,000 ft^{2} (24,000 m^{2}) passenger terminal and parking facility on Otay Mesa. A 30-page report written by Ralph Nieders for the San Diego Chamber of Commerce titled "Key Issues TwinPort/ASA Proposals" compared both proposals and highlighted issues such as airspace, routes, slots (landing rights), U.S. airline interest and support, and was prepared in anticipation of President Carlos Salinas' visit to California which began in San Diego on September 28, 1991. In San Diego, President Salinas did not endorse the Twinports concept and instead announced Mexico would proceed with ASA's $300 million U.S. dollar expansion plan for the Tijuana airport and that private investors would provide $700 million U.S. dollars to build a state of the art Boeing 747 and jumbo aircraft maintenance center to make the Tijuana airport into "one of the most important airports not only in Mexico but in the whole region". This position was bolstered by the uncertainty over the Hong Kong transition from British to Chinese rule that had led to the exodus of people and capital from Hong Kong and the belief that Cathay Pacific would relocate or reflag part of its aircraft fleet to Mexico making the Tijuana airport its North and Latin American hub base.

== 1991: Aerocharter–Nieders counter-proposal ==
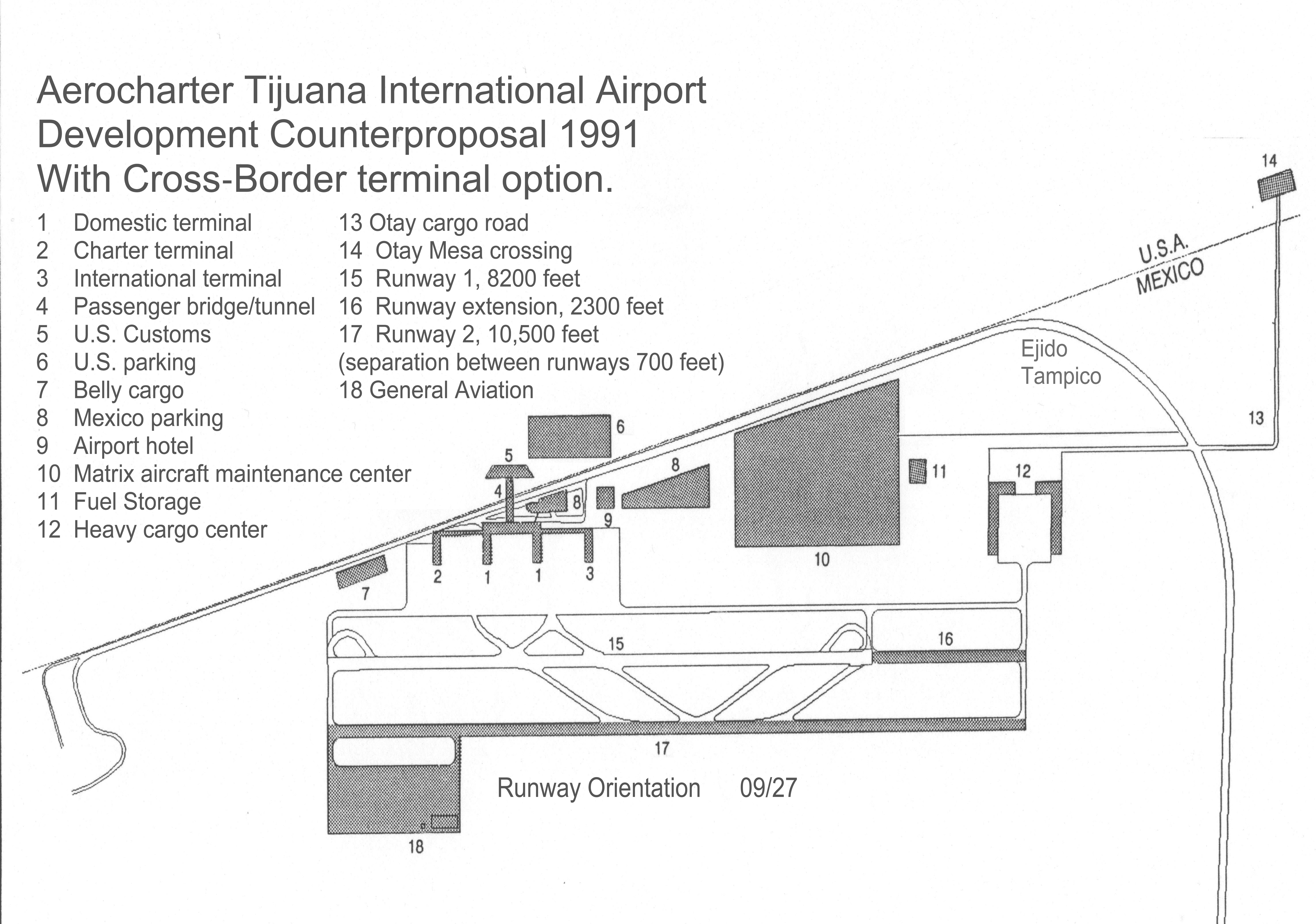
Image 7: Aerocharter-Nieders Tijuana cross-border terminal counter-proposal, 1991

The 1991 ASA cross-border terminal proposal would have required the relocation of roads and buildings on the U.S. side, and the resolution of an ongoing land dispute between the Mexican government and the former Ejido Tampico occupying a portion of the Tijuana airport. The occupied land was part of the 320 hectares (790 acres) Ejido (a communal type farm) the Mexican government had expropriated to expand the Tijuana airport in 1970. When the Mexican government failed to compensate the ejidatarios (communal farmers), they retook possession of a 79 hectares (200 acres) portion of the Tijuana airport which had been part of the Ejido Tampico. The 1991 ASA proposal would have required building an international passenger terminal across the disputed Ejido Tampico property and evicting the ejidatarios, who had threatened armed resistance.

The 1991 ASA proposal would also have prevented the runway alignment as proposed under San Diego's TwinPorts airport plan, and separated the Tijuana airport's domestic and international terminals by 1.4 miles (2.3 kilometers) requiring domestic passengers wishing to use the cross-border terminal or international passengers interconnecting with domestic flights, to be moved by buses or a people mover between terminals. In addition, being a point-to-point airport with only 2 million annual passengers in 1990 with no airline hub operations, Tijuana's appeal to international commercial carriers was very limited.

As shown by image 7, Aerocharter/Nieders then presented a counter-proposal that consolidated both the domestic and international Tijuana terminals with a cross-border terminal to allow passengers to choose between domestic and international flights, and avoid a confrontation with those occupying the former Ejido Tampico. To attract air charter operators, which were emerging in Europe and the Pacific Rim, a charter component was also incorporated into the terminal area. As commercial airlines like to operate within narrow landing and departure windows, generally during peak daylight hours, and developing new commercial routes and maintaining scheduled flights are both capital intensive and time sensitive, charter operators would have helped attract and develop international flights, and filled Tijuana's excess capacity during non-peak hours. A heavy cargo center would also have been created east of the Matrix aircraft maintenance center and would have tied into the existing infrastructure to efficiently move air cargo through the U.S.–Mexico Otay Mesa commercial crossings. The redesign would have minimized building costs both in Mexico and the United States, and would not have impeded neither ASA's expansion plans nor the development of a San Diego airport on Otay Mesa.

== 1992: Aeropuertos y Servicios Auxiliares (ASA) no cross-border proposal ==
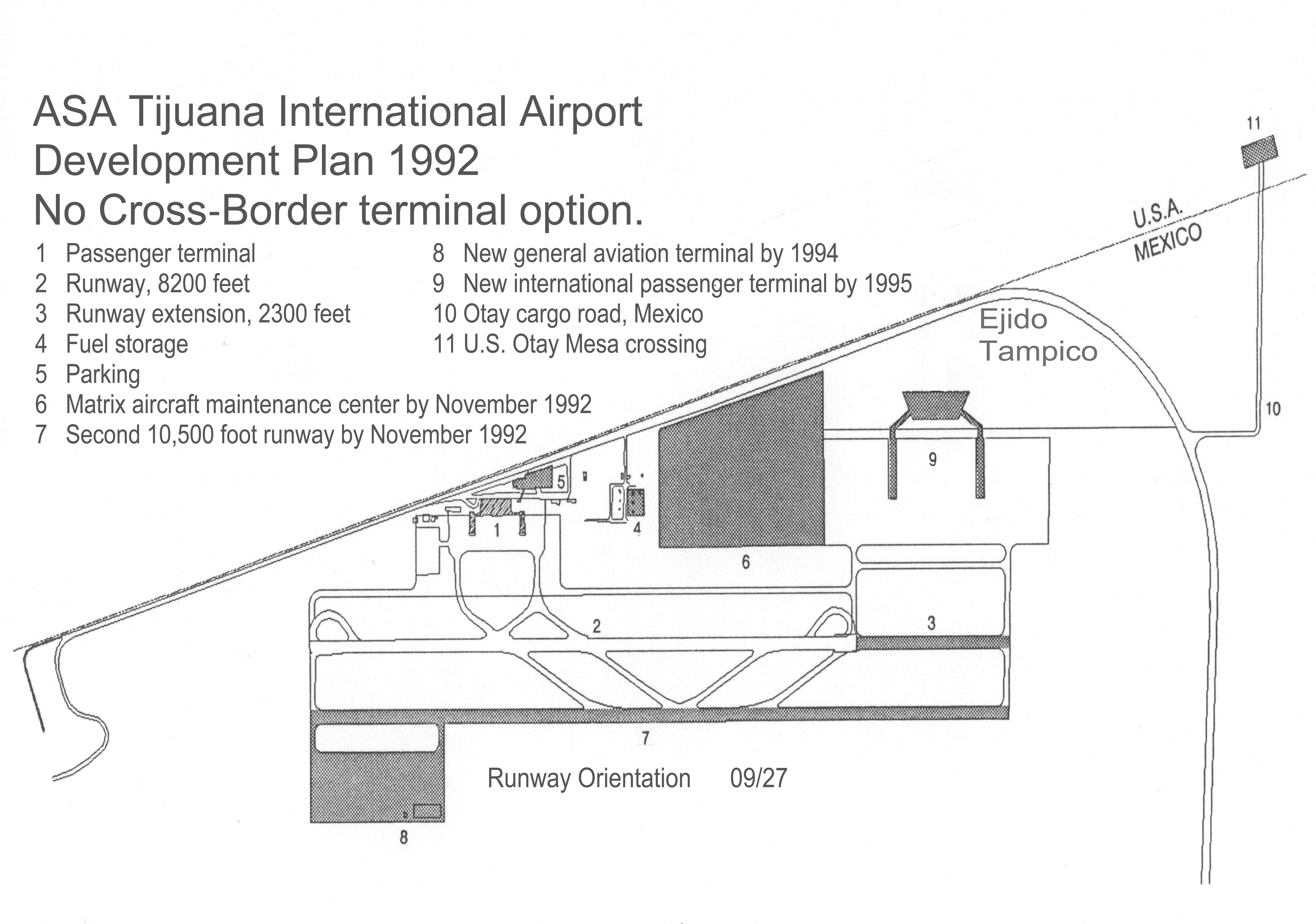
Image 8: ASA, Tijuana airport development plan without cross-border terminal, 1992

As negotiations between San Diego and Mexico continued but failed to reach a compromise, in March, 1992, ASA released an updated master plan (image 8) with projected completion dates for the Matrix aircraft maintenance center and the expansion of the Tijuana airport that included two 10,500-foot runways with a separation of 700 feet (210 meters) by November 1992, and an international terminal by 1995 but without a cross-border terminal. The maintenance center, runways and new international terminal were to service Cathay Pacific and attract other Asian airlines such as Japan Airlines (JAL) and Korean Air (KAL). In a press conference on March 25, 1992, the Tijuana airport officially announced the "$300 to $400" million dollar expansion, that the second runway was more than 30 percent complete and that the first Tijuana-Honolulu-Tokyo flight would start by May, 1992.

Driven by the continued belief that Cathay Pacific would relocate part of its aircraft fleet and establish a maintenance base at the Tijuana airport, and that other Asian airlines would follow, on April 14, 1992, the director of ASA, Jose Andres de Oteyza stated at a news conference at the Tijuana airport that neither the Mexican government nor ASA had any interest in the development of a "binational airport" with San Diego. He outlined ASA's counter-proposal and indicated that ASA would continue with its development plans that included the expansion of the terminal, extending the existing runway to "10,600" feet, building a second "12,000" foot runway and potentially adding a "grand international terminal". He stated that the planned expansion would allow the Tijuana airport to service large aircraft, such as the Boeing 747s, and handle 20 million annual passengers. He went further to state that the ongoing discussions between Mexico and San Diego were inconsequential as they did not involve the U.S. government.

On April 21, 1992, Jose Andres de Oteyza met with Peter Soderquist representing the City of San Diego Airport Division in Mexico City and on April 22, sent a letter to San Diego Mayor Maureen O'Connor stating that ASA was under the impression that the Mexico-San Diego study group was only considering the TwinPorts proposal and was not aware that the study process was comparing both the ASA and TwinPorts proposals, and could consider a "third" proposal. Jose Andres de Oteyza wrote that while the TwinPorts study process was not concluded and demand at the Tijuana airport continued to rise, ASA had to continue with its development program, and that the press had created "innumerable confusion" by failing to understand ASA's position.

The ASA proposal did not address issues on the shared U.S. airspace and the ILS coordination on the 09 approach between the U.S. Navy's helicopter training base at Naval Outlying Landing Field Imperial Beach, San Diego's Brown Field Municipal Airport in Otay Mesa, and the Tijuana airport which operationally created a single runway westerly approach between the three airports, nor changes in aircraft design and size requiring high capacity passenger terminals, wider taxiways, and larger runway separations above the 700-foot (210-meter) to safely support simultaneous operations of dissimilar sized aircraft (wake turbulence/wake vortex separation). While a FAA-funded study on TwinPorts found the joint airport concept viable, opposition to TwinPorts continued to grow both in Mexico and San Diego. None of the ASA plans announced on March 25, 1992, materialized while during this time, Britain and the People’s Republic of China came to an agreement over the new Hong Kong International Airport at Chek Lap Kok. As China agreed to recognize private investment rights acquired during Hong Kong's British rule, Cathay Pacific agreed to establish its hub and maintenance base at Chek Lap Kok, undermining the Matrix aircraft maintenance center and ASA’s development plans for converting the Tijuana airport into a major regional and airline hub airport. The Hong Kong International Airport at Chek Lap Kok was designed with two 12,500-foot runways (3.8 kilometers) separated by 5,000 feet (1.5 kilometers) to allow for simultaneous aircraft operations on 1,255 hectares (3,100 acres).

== 1992: Valenzuela–Nieders phased TwinPorts development plan ==
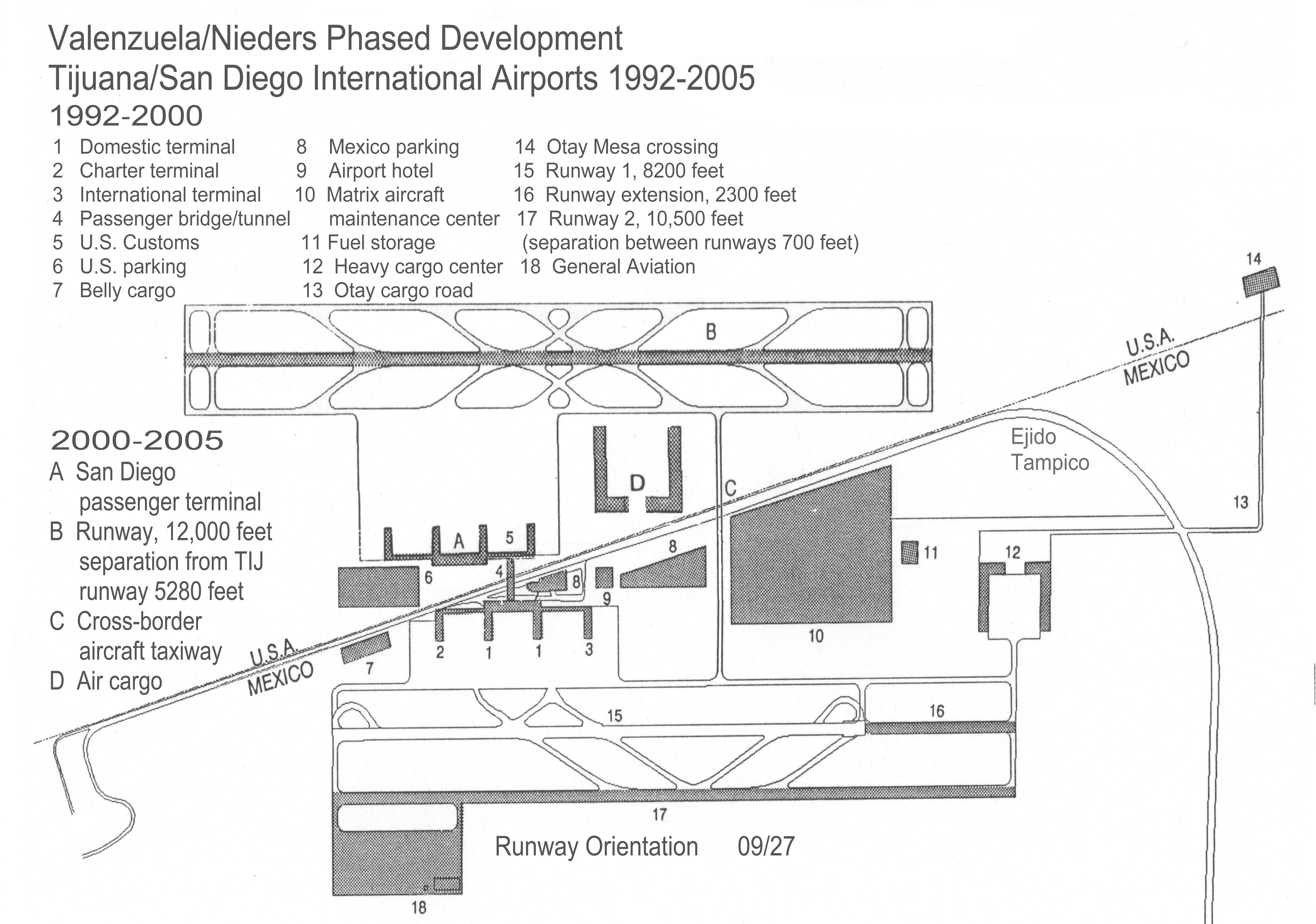
Image 9: Valenzuela-Nieders Tijuana/San Diego phased cross-border airport proposal, 1992

Rodolfo Ramos Ortiz failed to recover from his injuries suffered from a car accident in San Diego in June, 1991. Unable to continue with the project, in April, 1992, Rodolfo Ramos and Ralph Nieders met with Gilberto Valenzuela Ezquerro, former Secretary of the Ministry of Public Works (Secretaria de Obras Publicas: SOP), who under Mexico's President Gustavo Díaz Ordaz (1964–1970) had been in charge of modernizing Mexico's airports and transportation system. Gilberto Valenzuela was also responsible for creating Mexico's Aeropuertos y Servicios Auxiliares- ASA (Airports and Auxiliary Services), Servicios a la Navegación en El Espacio Aereo Mexicano- SENEAM (Mexican Airspace Navigation Services similar to the Federal Aviation Administration), and the Dirección General de Aeronáutica Civil- DGAC (General Directorate of Civil Aeronautics). Gilberto Valenzuela took a personal interest in the cross-border terminal as in 1965, he had proposed creating the world's first bi-national airport between Mexico and the United States. In 1964, as Mexico's Minister of Public Works (SOP), he was in charge of overseen the construction of the Amistad Dam (The Friendship Dam) along the Rio Grande between Texas and Coahuila and of all the construction with regards to Mexico's 1968 Summer Olympics; the first Olympics to be sponsored in any Latin country, and the 1970 FIFA World Cup. With this in mind and in an environment of cooperation between Mexico and the United States, in 1965 Gilberto Valenzuela proposed building a joint Tijuana-San Diego airport on Otay Mesa to replace San Diego's Lindbergh Field which at the time was only 450 acres (180 hectares) and had a single runway restricted by San Diego Bay, and the Tijuana airport which also had a single runway and was only 316 acres (128 hectares) restricted by a canyon.

In 1964, the San Diego Unified Port District, which operated Lindbergh Field, floated a $10.9 million bond of which half was earmarked to modernize the airport to support the increased use of jet aircraft and higher passenger loads. As San Diego's passenger terminal on Pacific Highway, which had been in service since 1931, had reached its capacity, San Diego's initial plan of rebuilding the terminal was changed to relocating it from Pacific Highway to Harbor Drive. With better street access and available space, the Harbor Drive terminal could be built with new support facilities and automobile parking to accommodate larger aircraft and passenger volumes, but the issue of building a second runway and future terminal expansion was restricted by the lack of land. Obstacles in Lindbergh Field's 27 main runway approach also prevented a 3.0 degree glide slope required for an Instrument Landing System (ILS). With the Tijuana airport built in 1951 facing similar problems of inadequate support facilities and terminal capacity, Gilberto Valenzuela proposed pooling resources and funds to build a joint U.S.-Mexico airport with multiple runways and foul weather ILS capability to compete with the expanding Los Angeles International Airport (LAX). San Diego's Mayor Frank Curran rejected the proposal as he considered Otay Mesa too remote for a regional airport. As the head of the SOP, Gilberto Valenzuela then expanded the Tijuana airport from 128 to 448 hectares (320 to 1,110 acres) by incorporating the Ejido Tampico (at the time the Mexican government owned the communal farm land) and designed a new terminal and runway at a cost of $108,487,000 Pesos ($8,678,960 U.S. dollars). For better access, the airport terminal was moved adjacent to Mexico Federal Highway 2 and to support jet aircraft such as the Boeing 727 and larger jets entering service in 1968, such as the Boeing 737, the new runway was reinforced and extended from 6,260 to 8,200 feet (1,910 to 2,500 meters). But in 1969, at the inauguration of the Amistad Dam between Texas and Mexico, President Richard Nixon notified President Gustavo Díaz Ordaz of his intent to initiate Operation Intercept to stem the flow of narcotics between the U.S. and Mexico. As Minister of Public Works (SOP) for Mexico, Gilberto Valenzuela was also present at the inauguration and as political tensions rose between Washington and Mexico City, to minimize incursion into U.S. airspace, the new runway at the Tijuana airport was re-orientated from 10/28 to 09/27. The change in orientation impacted the Tijuana airport's approach over Cerro San Isidro, a 2,600-foot (790-meter) land obstacle which increased the east approach glide slope above 3 degrees and prevented an ILS approach on the 27 runway required during foul weather landings. Due to prevailing winds, the 27 runway is Tijuana's main approach pattern.

On May 6, 1992, addressing the issue of San Diego's TwinPorts airport proposal, Carl Schellenberger, Regional Administrator for the Federal Aviation Administration (FAA) wrote to the Airport Manager of the City of San Diego Peter Soderquist that in a preliminary review, a runway with "an approximate alignment of 107/287 degrees magnetic appears to be viable from the point of view of establishing an approach from the east with a 3 degree glide slope", which was a prerequisite for establishing a commercially viable airport on Otay Mesa. While land obstacles (Cerro San Isidro) and topography (located at the edge of a canyon which limited the relocation and extension of the 27 runway), gave the Tijuana airport's east approach a glide slope of 3.4 degrees, a valley and lower land obstacles north of Cerro San Isidro on the Tijuana side coupled with ample land to the west on the San Diego side allowed for the construction of a new runway with a 3 degree glide slope as proposed under the TwinPort's development plan. Takeoffs from the Tijuana airport's 27 orientation would also have been improved by allowing aircraft a straight departure into U.S. airspace and a gradual banking over the Pacific rather than an immediate banking south on take-off to avoid entering U.S. airspace; reducing both noise and pollution over residential and commercial areas in Tijuana. The commercial airline development of San Diego's Brown Field Municipal Airport with a 08/26 orientation was also limited as a major land obstacle (Otay Mountain) with an elevation of 3,600 feet (1,100 meters) prevented a 3.0 degree glide slope and had been the site of several aircraft crashed.

On May 8, 1992, an economic report partially funded by the FAA was released that outlined the regional benefits of a shared trans-border airport but ASA indicated it could not support any San Diego airport development which would delay its $125 million U.S. dollar expansion of the Tijuana airport. As negotiations between San Diego and Mexico came to a standstill, Gilberto Valenzuela attempted to mediate the differences between the SCT/ASA and San Diego. As ASA's updated 1992 development plan for the Tijuana airport removed both the cross-border terminal option and was counter to a joint Tijuana-San Diego airport, in June 1992, Valenzuela-Nieders prepared an eighty-page report and presented a "third-option" of a modified/phased development which attempted to incorporate both ASA's and San Diego's TwinPorts proposals as shown by image 9. On June 29, 1992, Rodolfo Ramos Ortiz died in Mexico City; Gilberto Valenzuela and Ralph Nieders continued with the development of the Tijuana cross-border passenger terminal.

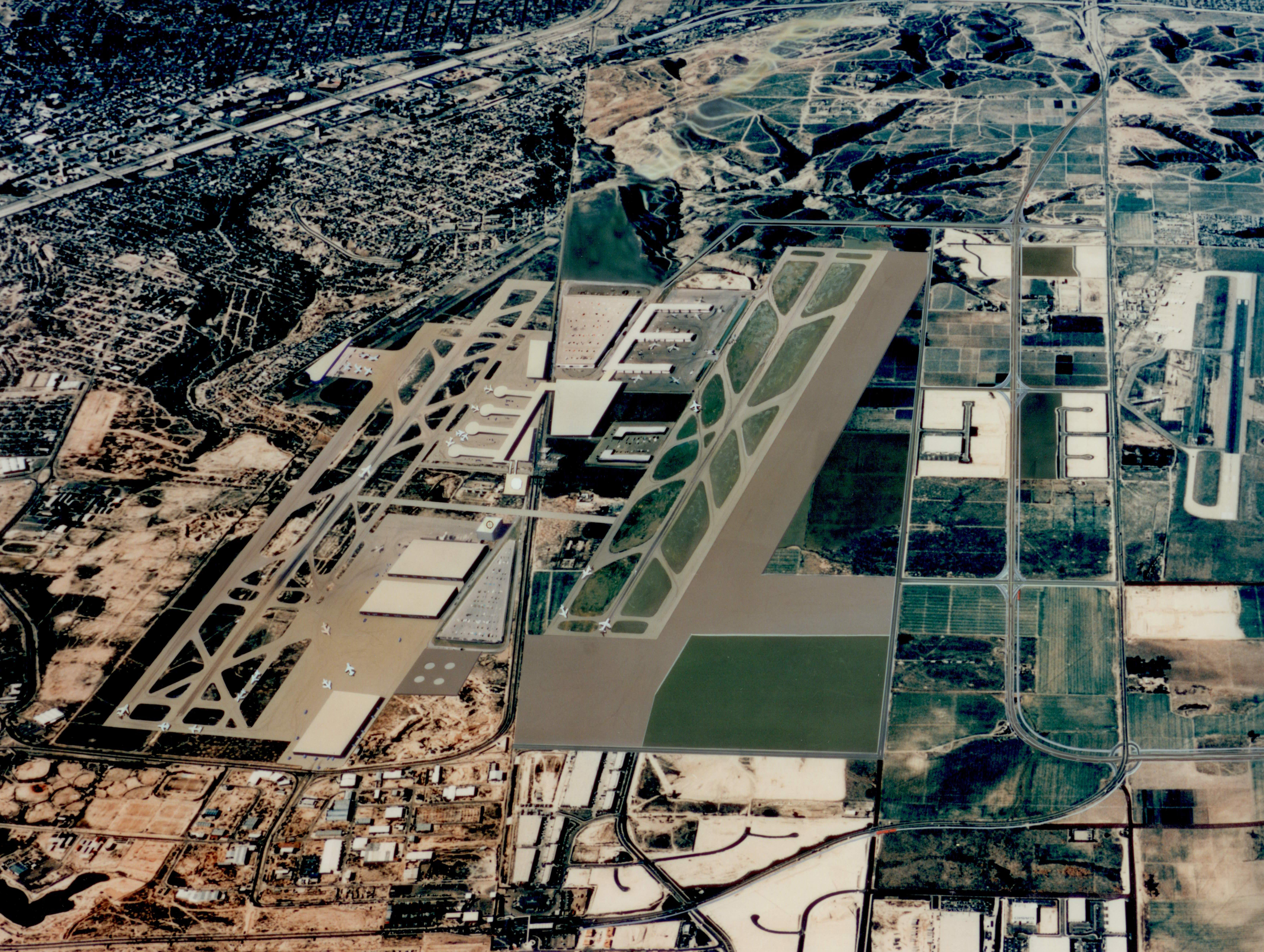
Image 10: Valenzuela-Nieders cross-border airport rendering, 1992

The Valenzuela-Nieders phased TwinPorts design was derived from the Munich Airport that began operations in May 1992. The Munich Airport's foot print of 1,580 hectares (3,900 acres) was similar to the proposed Tijuana/San Diego TwinPorts proposal but unlike the original TwinPorts proposal (image 4) that showed parallel runways and separate Tijuana/San Diego passenger terminals, to achieve a 3 degree glide slope from the east, the modified Valenzuela-Nieders phased TwinPorts proposal used a staggered two runway configuration which moved the San Diego runways further west from those in Tijuana, and also connected both the Tijuana and San Diego passenger terminals through a cross-border facility as shown by the conceptual rendering on image 10.

With a cross-border facility connecting the terminals, Tijuana and San Diego passengers would have been able to easily connect between Mexican and U.S. domestic and international destinations/flights, which in effect would have created a regional hub airport between Mexican, U.S., and international airlines and made the Tijuana-San Diego trans-border airport competitive and an alternative to the congested Los Angeles (LAX) and San Francisco (SFO) international airports. Coupled with Mexico's underutilized international and corresponding routes and time slots, the initial stage would have attracted co-investments and concessions to the Tijuana airport by airlines seeking to develop Pacific and U.S. West Coast destinations, and companies providing services to support commercial, charter and cargo operations. The construction of a 12,000-foot runway on the San Diego side separated by 5280 feet from Tijuana's runways would also have allowed for simultaneous operations between the two airports while the cross-border aircraft taxiway would have given Tijuana access to an east approach, all weather, 12,000-foot reinforced runway with a 3 degree glide slope capable of handling fully loaded super jumbo jets weighing over 600 tons. Having designed the Tijuana airport, Gilberto Valenzuela also disclosed that the Tijuana runway was built over landfill and a seasonal stream which through water saturation over the years had caused cracks and settlement on the runways' center, creating a dip that could stress the wheel suspension of fully loaded and landing aircraft. In addition, not having been designed to support heavy aircraft, the added volume of such aircraft would accelerate the Tijuana runway's decay creating a safety hazard through added asphalt and concrete debris which could damage turbine blades. Runway safety and airline operations would also be impacted by a reduction of both the runway's capacity and length as sections would have to be closed for repairs at increased and unscheduled intervals. Access to San Diego's proposed TwinPorts runway would have allowed Tijuana to completely rebuild its main runway without affecting operations or safety. The counter-proposal was officially presented as a "third option" on September 2, 1992, before the San Diego-Mexico airport working group and to keep with ASA's planned development schedule, a $130 million U.S. dollar first phase expansion was proposed that included lengthening the Tijuana airport's main runway to 12,000 and the construction of a cross-border terminal with a second phase $190 million U.S. dollar expansion of the Tijuana airport that would have developed a second runway 700 feet (210 meters) south of the existing runway, and completed the Matrix aircraft maintenance center.

On September 9, 1992, the FAA approved a study grant for "Otay Mesa (Twinports) airport San Diego, California AIP Project No. 3-06-0215-02-92." But opposition both in Mexico and San Diego continued to rise. San Diego's Mayor Maureen O'Connor had also previously announced she would not to run for re-election which impacted airport negotiations.

During the 1992 San Diego mayoral primary campaign, tensions emerged between the two leading Republican candidates, San Diego Councilman Ron Roberts and San Diego County Supervisor Susan Golding. Susan Golding won the Republican mayoral primary. The Mayoral election highlighted the division between airport strategies. Democrat Peter Navarro (running as an independent) proposed canceling the TwinPorts negotiations and espoused the ASA proposal of an expanded Tijuana airport connected to passenger and air cargo facilities on San Diego's Otay Mesa through an aircraft taxiway but no north side runways while Susan Golding proposed continued negotiation for TwinPorts but also expanding San Diego's downtown airport through a new passenger terminal. In November 1992, Susan Golding defeated Peter Navarro and was elected as San Diego's Mayor. The change in administration brought with it changes in personnel and airport negotiations.

== 1993: TwinPorts cancellation/First drug "super tunnel" ==
In March 1993, tensions emerged between Mexico's Minister of Finance and Public Credit Pedro Aspe, who supported a joint airport development with San Diego and the privatization of Mexico's airport system, and the director of ASA José Andrés de Oteyza, who opposed both. As ASA failed to attract contracts and commitments from foreign investors and airline carriers, ASA was unable to meet its proposed $300 million U.S. dollar expansion of the Tijuana airport. As Cathay Pacific did not relocate any of its aircraft or maintenance operations to the Tijuana airport, the planned $700 million U.S. dollar Matrix maintenance center failed to attract aircraft contracts. Without funding, foreign investors and airlines, the 1992 ASA expansion plans for the Tijuana airport that included building an international terminal and a second 10,500-foot runway, had to be canceled. Jose Andres de Oteyza was forced to resign and Luis Martínez Villacaña became the new director of ASA. Gilberto Valenzuela and Ralph Nieders met with Luis Martínez Villacaña, who indicated support for a joint Tijuana–San Diego airport. Deputy Mayor and San Diego Councilman Tom Behr was then invited to Mexico City and met with the new director of ASA Martínez Villacaña, who requested a brief position paper that could be presented to Mexico's Secretary of the SCT, Andrés Caso Lombardo.

Negotiations on TwinPorts were re-initiated but as doubts emerged over the passage of the North American Free Trade Agreement (NAFTA) and Mexico's co-investment/concession program failed to attract the required capital to modernize the country’s transportation infrastructure, Andres Caso Lombardo resigned on March 29, 1993. Mexican President Carlos Salinas de Gortari then appointed Emilio Gamboa Patrón as Secretary of the SCT.

On May 18, 1993, Mayor Susan Golding preparing for a San Diego City Council vote on extending the building moratorium on Otay Mesa scheduled for May 25, sent a letter to the Secretary of the SCT, Emilio Gamboa Patrón. The Mexican embassy in Washington had previously sent a letter to the Mayor of Chula Vista, Tim Nader, indicating opposition to the development of a "binational" airport with San Diego. Mayor Golding requested an official position by the SCT on the TwinPorts issue that could be presented before the San Diego City Council's building moratorium vote on Otay Mesa. Emilio Gamboa replied on May 24 (oficio 1837) and stated that the Tijuana airport had sufficient capacity to meet the region's short-term demand and should be fully developed before initiating negotiations for a new San Diego airport on the U.S. side of Otay Mesa. Even though Cathay Pacific and other Asian airlines had opted not to initiate commercial flights or use the maintenance center at the Tijuana airport, Mexico’s SCT Secretary Emilio Gamboa continued to promote the failed 1992 ASA development plan which claimed that Tijuana could service up to 20 million annual passengers. Subsequent events also threatened to undermine all negotiations both in Mexico and San Diego, and ASA's expansion plans for the Tijuana airport.

In the afternoon of May 24, 1993, at the Guadalajara airport, the Arellano-Felix Tijuana Cartel attempted to assassinate Joaquín Guzmán, head of the Sinaloa Cartel and inadvertently assassinated Cardinal Juan Jesús Posadas Ocampo and six others. The Guadalajara airport was immediately shut-down and all flights were grounded, but the power and reach of the Arellano-Felix Cartel was made apparent as a commercial passenger jet destined to Tijuana was detained to allow the gunmen to board and was able to depart. Upon landing at the Tijuana airport three hours later, the commercial passenger jet was not intercepted by police or military personnel stationed at the Tijuana airport and the gunmen escaped. On May 31, 1993, Mexican agents discovered a partially completed 1500-foot tunnel adjacent to the Tijuana airport and crossing under the U.S.-Mexico border to a warehouse on Otay Mesa in San Diego. It was described by the U.S. Drug Enforcement Administration (DEA) in San Diego as the "Taj Mahal" of drug tunnels along the U.S.-Mexico border and was linked to Joaquin 'El Chapo' Guzmán. It was the first of a series of drug "super tunnels" in Otay Mesa that would be linked to the Sinaloa Cartel. As shown by image 17 (Drug tunnel corridors Tijuana airport/Otay Mesa), the creation of a joint San Diego-Tijuana transborder airport would have undermined drug tunnel and narcotics smuggling operations along the Otay Mesa U.S.-Mexico border. On June 9, 1993, Joaquin 'El Chapo' Guzmán was captured in Guatemala, deported to Mexico and arrested. In the aftermath of the assassination, the Director of the Tijuana airport Philippe ‘Felipe’ Baril was promoted and reassigned to ASA in Mexico City to head contracts and security, and was subsequently investigated for fraud.

After serving less than four months as the Director of ASA, in June 1993, Luis Martinez Villacaña resigned due to health issues and Guillermo Ruiz de Tereza became the new Director of ASA.

On July 17, 1993, Emilio Gamboa met with U.S. Secretary of Transportation Federico Peña in San Antonio, Texas, and requested a formal clarification of San Diego's right to negotiate an airport option directly with the Mexican government as in Mexico, airports fell under federal jurisdiction and could not be negotiated by local municipalities. The U.S. Department of Transportation never supplied any clarification of San Diego's right to negotiate an airport option directly with Mexico. During the interim, strong opposition had emerged to the North American Free Trade Agreement (NAFTA) and undocumented/illegal immigration had become a major issue. In California Governor Pete Wilson had asked Mexico to deploy its army to stem the follow of undocumented/illegal immigration while Senator Barbara Boxer asked that the National Guard be used to support U.S. Border Patrol agents. In September, tensions between the U.S. and Mexico rose further when James Jones was appointed U.S. ambassador to Mexico. All of which impacted airport negotiations between Mexico and San Diego.

In October 1993, a San Diego delegation headed by Mayor Susan Golding arrived in Mexico City to attempt an airport agreement between San Diego and Mexico. Negotiations failed as Guillermo Ruiz de Tereza, the director for ASA, rejected the Twinports concept and then set a precondition that Mexico would reconsider resuming negotiations if all of San Diego's air passenger traffic (12 million passengers in 1992) was diverted to the Tijuana airport (2 million passengers in 1992). In effect, Mexico required the closure of San Diego's international airport and that all San Diego commercial passenger flights land and depart from the Tijuana airport. The negotiating precondition established by the ASA director would have required the City of San Diego and U.S. airlines to fund the full expansion of the Tijuana airport and move all San Diego commercial passenger operations into Mexico, creating a security and logistics issue as domestic U.S. aircraft and/or passengers would be required to move across the U.S.-Mexico border and be subject to U.S. Customs and Immigration controls. As belly cargo constitutes a major component to airline revenue, the ASA precondition would also have impacted airline profitability and disrupted all air cargo service into San Diego by forcing domestic air cargo to move across the U.S.-Mexico border making it subject to U.S. customs inspection and processing, and severely handicapping regional companies relying on time sensitive and high value goods that are moved by air cargo.

While the ASA precondition would have increased commercial passenger traffic into Tijuana seven-fold (from 2 million to 14 million annual passengers), making it in 1993 Mexico's second largest airport, the increased volume of aircraft operations would also have impacted a strategic U.S. Navy helicopter base along the U.S.-Mexico border (Naval Outlying Landing Field Imperial Beach) where sixty percent of U.S. naval helicopter pilots were being trained. As a municipal authority, the City of San Diego could not negotiate any agreement with Mexico that would impact U.S. military operations or bases, and while the Secretary of Defense and the U.S. Department of the Navy had indicated in 1989 and 1990 a willingness to coordinate operations with Mexico regarding the Naval Outlying Landing Field Imperial Beach (REAM Field), it was conditioned on the development of a new San Diego airport at Otay Mesa to remove continued efforts by local officials and businessmen to convert Naval Air Station Miramar into a joint use (military/civilian) airport. The City of San Diego also could not negotiate for the Federal Aviation Administration (FAA) as the relocation of air traffic would have required the FAA to establish new bi-lateral agreements and routes with Mexico, impacting operations at Southern California TRACON which regulates all aircraft traffic in Southern California. The added air traffic into the Tijuana airport would also have restricted civilian aircraft operations at San Diego’s Brown Field Municipal Airport. The San Diego delegation "stunned", rejected Mexico's offer and the TwinPorts airport project was cancelled. A recession during that same period also caused the collapsed of land values in San Diego and the selected site for the Aerocharter cross-border terminal on the U.S. side was foreclosed.

== 1994–1996: Mexico's airport privatization program ==
In 1994, Ernesto Zedillo was elected President of Mexico. In order to modernize Mexico’s air transportation system, in 1995 the Zedillo administration initiated Mexico's airport privatization program headed by Dr. Aaron Dychter Poltolarek, who was appointed as Under-Secretary of the SCT (Ministry of Communications and Transportation). On December 22, 1995, the SCT published the "Ley de Aeropuertos" (Airport Law), which allowed for the privatization of Mexico's entire airport network. As the majority of Mexico's regional airports were marginally profitable and operating below a Million Annual Passengers (MAP), to make the airport privatization program attractive to foreign investors, four airport concessions were created: Southeast Airport Group (Grupo Aeroportuario del Sureste) consisting of 9 airports with 9.7 MAP and headquartered in Cancún, Pacific Airport Group (Grupo Aeroportuario del Pacífico) consisting of 12 airports with 15 MAP and headquartered in Guadalajara, Central-North Airport Group (Grupo Aeroportuario Centro Norte) consisting of 13 airports with 9 MAP and headquartered in Monterrey, and the Mexico City Airport Group (Grupo Aeroportuario de la Ciudad de Mexico), with a single airport with 19 MAP and headquartered in Mexico City.

Airport privatization began to take momentum in the late 1980s when the British government divested the British Airport Authority (BAA now known as Heathrow Airport Holdings) in 1987. BAA operated 7 airports including London Heathrow Airport. In the United States there was an equal movement towards privatization and two major operators emerged, Lockheed Air Terminal and Johnson Controls World Services (formerly Pan Am World Services). In 1994, there were privatization projects in more than 50 countries. During this period, Gilbert Ratto, Director General of Ruber S.A. de C.V., which operated the commercial areas of the passenger terminals at the Tijuana airport, and Ralph Nieders met with BAA, Lockheed Air Terminal, and Johnson Controls World Services to determine their interest in Mexico's airport privatization process and the development of the Tijuana cross-border passenger terminal. Lockheed Air terminal had focused its resources on projects in the former Soviet republics as well as other overseas markets from Australia to Turkey. BAA had looked at the Mexican market but opted for other projects. While Johnson Controls World Services initially considered developing the Tijuana cross-border passenger terminal and was actively looking into Mexico's airport privatization process with Grupo GUTSA S.A. de C.V., in September 1996 they also opted not to pursue the project and focus their efforts and resources within the U.S. market. Uncertainty over the Tijuana cross-border terminal carried over into the privatization process as Mexico's airport authority ASA had removed it from Tijuana's airport development plan in 1992, and the SCT did not include it as part of their proposed airport privatization program for the Pacific Airport Group.

In February 1996, the former Mexican Secretary of the SOP (Ministry of Public Works) Gilberto Valenzuela Ezquerro and Ralph Nieders met with Dr. Aaron Dychter, Under-Secretary of the SCT, and Alfredo Elias Ayub, the director of ASA, to re-initiate the concept of a cross-border terminal for the Tijuana airport. As the Secretary of the SOP from 1964 to 1970, Gilberto Valenzuela Ezquerro had been in charge of modernizing the Tijuana airport, and during his tenure as the head of the SOP, he built 20 of the 33 airports that were selected for privatization under the administration of President Ernesto Zedillo (1994–2000).

== 1996–2000: Casey Development–Nieders proposal ==
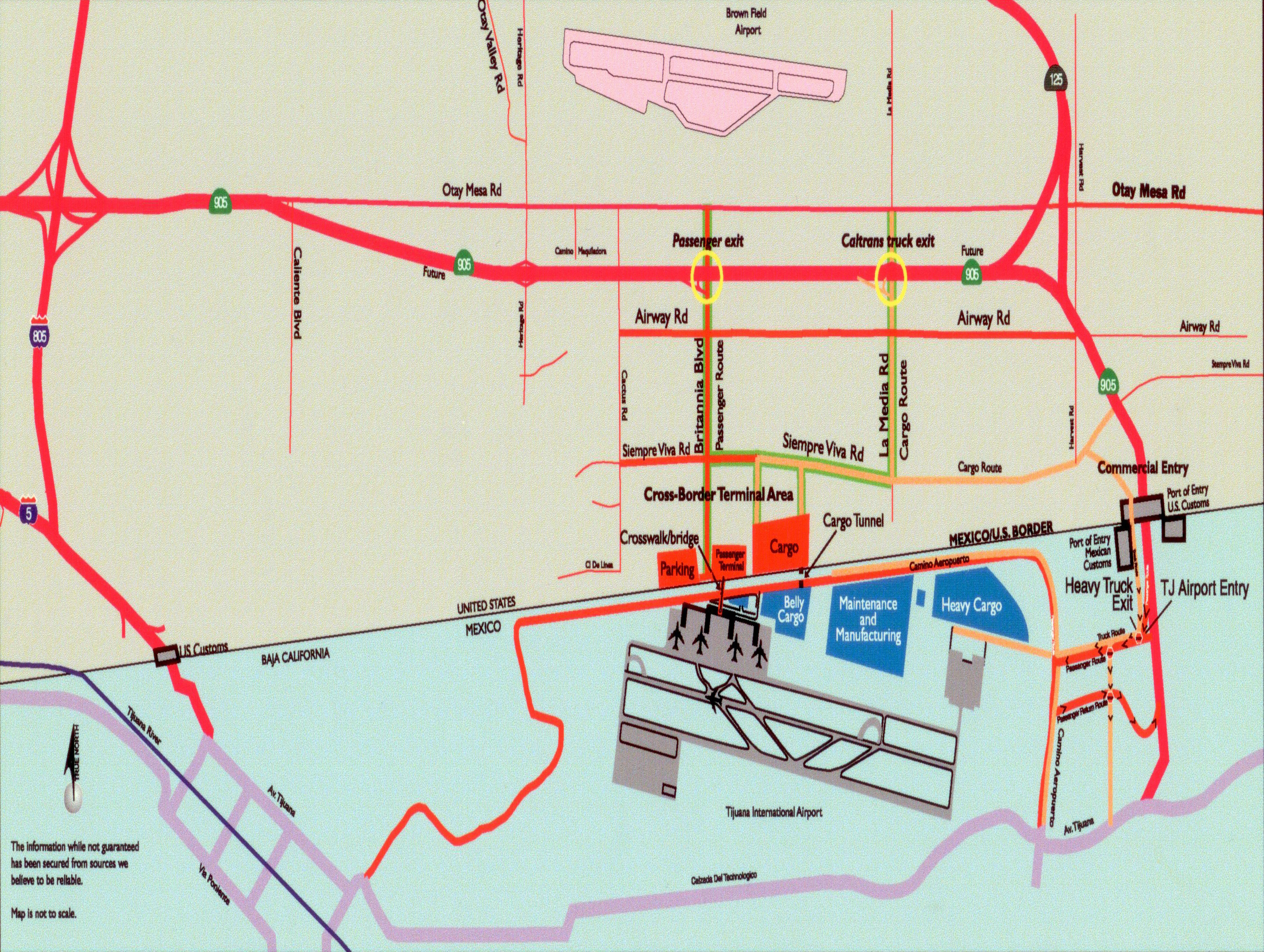
Image 11: Casey Development-Nieders Tijuana cross-border terminal and supporting infrastructure

During Mexico’s airport privatization process, Casey Development in San Diego, headed by Robert Casey, in conjunction with Gilberto Valenzuela Ezquerro and Ralph Nieders met with potential investment groups to promote the concept and development of a Tijuana cross-border passenger terminal. In addition, in 1998, the South County Economic Development Council received a grant to study the concept of a cross-border terminal for the Tijuana airport and generate a report which was co-authored by Steve Castaneda and Ralph Nieders.

In Mexico City, Gilberto Valenzuela arranged meetings with Grupo Mariscal, Grupo Marhnos, Grupo ICA, and Grupo Mina/SACSA. An updated cross-border terminal design as shown by image 11 was created by Casey Development/Nieders that incorporated the planned 905 freeway and exit ramps proposed by the California Department of Transportation (Caltrans).

In April 1998, Casey Development/Nieders and Grupo SACSA headed by Alfredo Miguel Afif began negotiations for a joint development agreement for the Tijuana cross-border terminal. SACSA operated as a FBO (fixed-base operator) at both the Mexico City International Airport and the Toluca International Airport, and had obtained the concession to build and operate the general aviation terminal at the Los Cabos International Airport in Baja California del Sur. On November 25, 1998, Gilberto Valenzuela and Grupo Mina/SACSA arranged for a San Diego delegation to meet with members of the Mexican Ministry of Interior, Tourism and ASA to discuss the development of a cross-border terminal. The San Diego delegation included Steven Moore, bi-national adviser to Mayor Susan Golding, Deputy Mayor Bryon Wear and Councilman Juan Vargas. Also attending were Gilberto Valenzuela, Robert Casey and Ralph Nieders representing the development team for the Tijuana cross-border terminal. Land negotiations for the crossing site had not been concluded. Three potential parcels had been identified: Martinez Ranch (62 acre site, prior Mexicana de Aviación and Aerocharter cross-border terminal option), Britannia Commerce Center (22 acre site owned by Frank Goldberg) and Martinez Trust (67 acre site with an IRS lien). News of the delegation's trip was published on November 29, 1998 and immediately impacted prices of the three selected sites. Because of cost, both Martinez Ranch and Britannia Commerce Center were dropped from consideration. In December 1998, an acquisition price of $2,349,000 (U.S. dollars) was established on Martinez Trust (San Diego parcel number APN 667-060-02) with a sixty-day escrow in equal partnership between Grupo Mina/SACSA and Casey Development. Grupo Mina/SACSA failed to meet the escrow deposit deadline and another offer was accepted on the selected parcel.

In 1999, a consortium consisting of the Spanish investors Unión Fenosa, Dragados and Aeropuertos Españoles y Navegación Aérea (AENA), together with the Mexican strategic investor Grupo Empresarial Ángeles, collectively known as Aeropuertos Mexicanos del Pacifico, S.A. de C.V. (AMP), won the Pacific 12 airport package known as Grupo Aeroportuario del Pacífico (GAP). Grupo Empresarial Ángeles was headed by Olegario Vázquez Raña, who took a personal interest in the development of the Tijuana cross-border passenger terminal after meeting with Gilberto Valenzuela and Ralph Nieders. The project was then incorporated as part of the development strategy for the Tijuana airport. Casey Development/Nieders became the project’s consultants for GAP and in January 2000, negotiated with Pema Properties to again secure parcel APN 667-060-02 (Martinez Trust, image 19) as the preferred cross-border terminal site with a listed price of $5,000,000 (U.S. dollars). The project's cost estimate was for $100 million U.S. dollars and prior negotiations had included Lufthansa Consulting.

== 2000–2001: Grupo Aeroportuario del Pacífico (GAP) Tijuana Master Plan/Ejido Tampico-Sinaloa Cartel/Management change ==
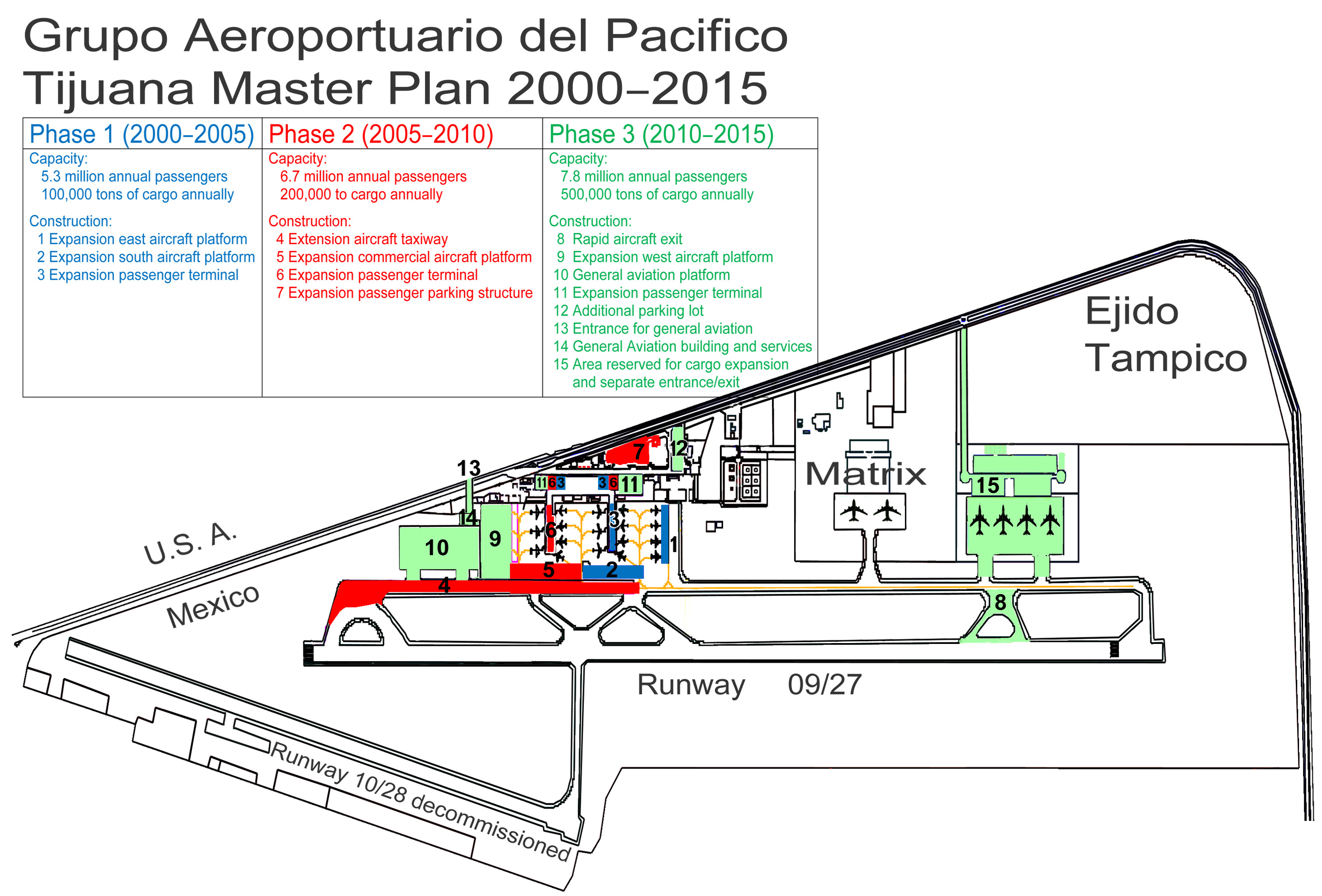
Image 12: GAP phased master plan for the Tijuana airport without a cross-border terminal, 2000

In July 2000, GAP published a 210-page Master Plan for the Tijuana airport (Plan Maestro del Aeropuerto de Tijuana) prepared by AENA (Aeropuertos Españoles y Navegación Aérea) and highlighted by image 12. Within the Master Plan a "reserve zone" was designated east of the Matrix aircraft maintenance center for the future development of a cargo terminal. The area designated as "Ejido Tampico" and consisting of 79 hectares (200 acres) showed no development plans as it was still occupied by ejidatarios (communal farmers), while the cross-border passenger terminal was not mentioned within Section 6, Proposed Development or Section 7, Maximum Possible Development, or in any of the supporting maps and plans included in the Master Plan of the Tijuana airport.

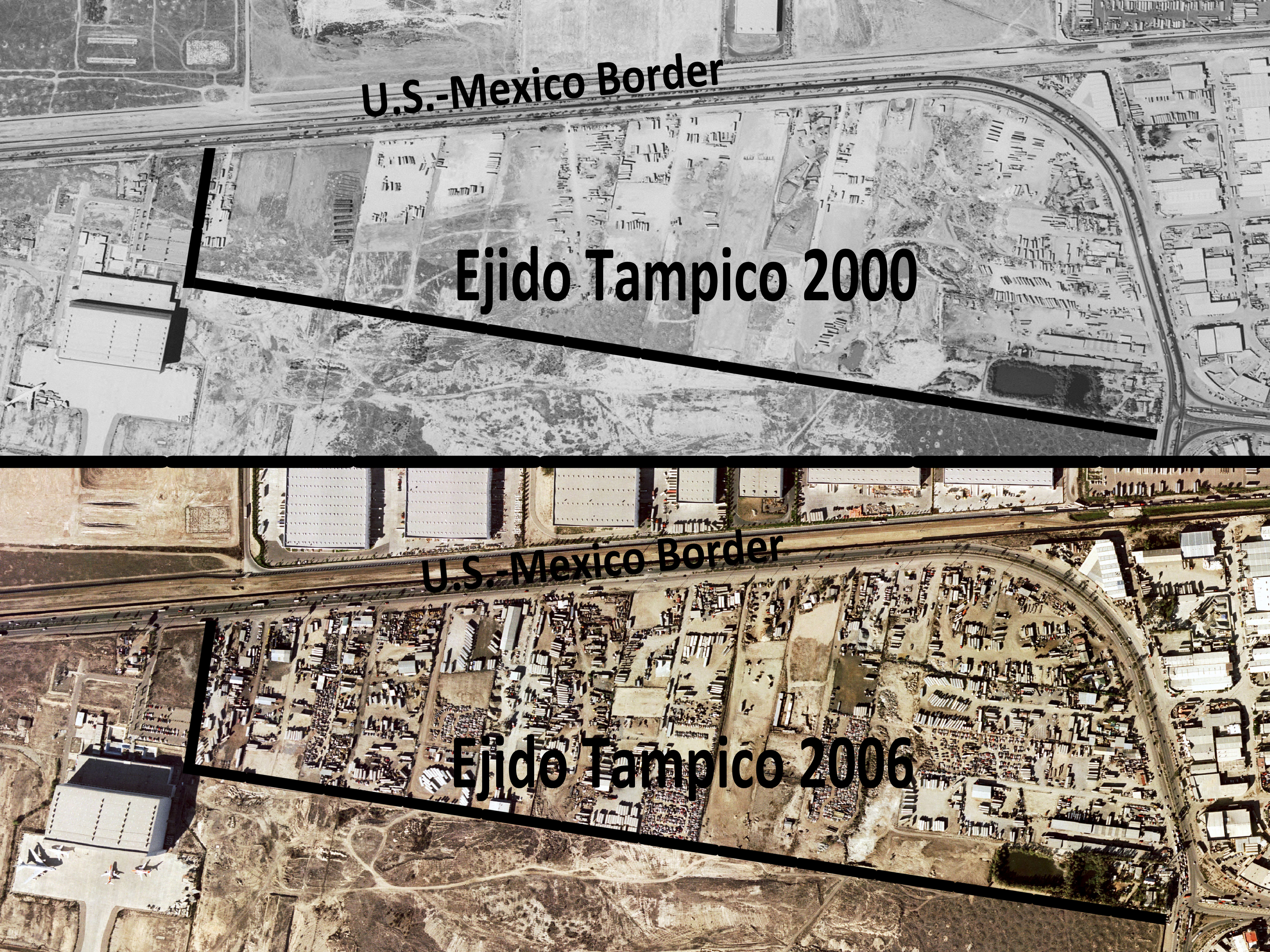
Image 13: Ejido Tampico comparison between 2000 and 2006

As part of the GAP concession given to Aeropuertos Mexicanos del Pacifico (AMP), the Mexican Ministry of Communications and Transportation (SCT) was to settle the ongoing land dispute with the former Ejido Tampico which occupied 79 hectares (200 acres) shown by image 13, of the Tijuana airport's 448 hectares (1,110 acres). Negotiations between the SCT and the former Ejido Tampico in 1999 had failed, and during his presidential campaign Vicente Fox promised he would resolve the issue. In 1970, the Mexican government had expropriated the 320 hectares (790 acres) Ejido Tampico to expand the Tijuana airport and build a new runway and passenger terminal. In 1970, the Mexican government established a value on the expropriated land from the Ejido Tampico at $1.4 million pesos ($112,000 U.S. dollars in 1970). When the Mexican government failed to indemnify the ejidatarios (the communal farmers) for their lost farmland, they reoccupied a 79 hectares (200 acres) portion of the expropriated 320 hectares (790 acres) Ejido. As shown by image 13, from 1970 to 2000, the occupied land remained relatively undeveloped. The Ejido program became a major component of Mexico's post revolution constitution of 1917 through Article 27, which allowed the Mexican government to expropriate property held by large landowners and redistributed it among landless peasants. Though technically the Ejido land belonged to the Mexican government, once distributed, ejidatarios obtained the right to cultivate and possess the land into perpetuity as long as the land did not remain barren (not farmed) for more than two years. In 1992, Mexico's President Carlos Salinas de Gortari modified Article 27 of the Mexican Constitution to allow ejidatarios to obtain property rights which allowed them to develop and sell their designated Ejidos. In 1999, the Mexican government reappraised the former Ejido Tampico and established a value on the expropriated 320 hectares (790 acres) at $1.2 million pesos ($125,560 U.S. dollars) while the ejidatarios of the former Ejido Tampico taking into account the increase in property values from 1970 to 1999 and the privatization of the Tijuana airport established a commercial value on their lost land at $2.8 billion pesos ($294 million U.S. dollars). No resolution was reached and upon taking office, Mexican President Vicente Fox was also unable to resolve the land dispute. In 2000, the ejidatarios occupying the land had contacted Casey Development/Nieders and indicated a settlement price of $26 million U.S. dollars, which the SCT failed to consider. As shown by image 13, the ejidatarios then proceeded to commercially develop the 79 hectares (200 acres) area designated as the Ejido Tampico at the Tijuana airport by leasing buildings and parcels to trucking companies which in 2006 were tied to a 2,400-foot (730-meter) drug "super tunnel" close to the Tijuana airport's runway and crossing the U.S.-Mexico border into a warehouse on Otay Mesa in San Diego. Similar to the "Taj Mahal" of drug tunnels discovered on Otay Mesa in 1993, the drug "super tunnel" was traced back to the Sinaloa Cartel headed by Joaquin 'El Chapo' Guzmán, who on January 19, 2001, escaped from the Mexican maximum security prison known as Federal Social Readaptation Center Number 2 West (Centro Federal de Readaptación Social Número 2 Occidente) near Guadalajara, Jalisco. As shown by image 18, the Sinaloa Cartel "super tunnel" originated from the former Ejido Tampico.

In September 2000, the Presidential permit process on the cross-border terminal was initiated by Casey Development/Nieders by submitting a written request to the U.S. Department of State. To further the process, Casey Development/Nieders requested a development outline from the City of San Diego and on October 10, 2000, gave a briefing on the cross-border terminal to the City of San Diego during an airport workshop. On November 6, 2000, the City of San Diego Planning and Development Review Department prepared a "general outline of the planning and development process" for the cross-border terminal which was both faxed and sent by DHL to Ubaldo de Azpiazu del Campo, who at the time was the General Director of GAP and to Casey Development/Nieders. The City of San Diego also adopted Resolution number R-294306 on November 27, 2000, limiting the future airport sites to "North Island, Miramar East and Camp Pendleton and calling for binational cooperation regarding planning for the cross border air terminal." On December 1, 2000, a determination was given by David E. Randolph, Coordinator for U.S.–Mexico Border Affairs for the U.S. Department of State which included an outline of the steps involved in the U.S. presidential process, but internal conflicts on investment and management strategies had emerged between Olegario Vázquez Raña, head of the Mexican strategic investor Grupo Empresarial Ángeles, and Union Fenosa and Dragados, two of the three Spanish investors who sought to limit investment layouts and increase dividend payouts. Unable to obtain a consensus, neither AMP nor GAP were willing to secure or commit to any property on the U.S. side of the border, which was a prerequisite to proceed with the Presidential permitting process.

In April 2001, the California Department of Transportation (Caltrans) covered the cross-border passenger terminal project and published the conceptual development of the Tijuana airport and cross-border terminal designed by Ralph Nieders in its quarterly journal as shown by image 15 and image 16. To lower building and operating costs, and allow for future expansion, the terminal was based on a modular concept and a translucent roofing membrane similar to that used at the San Diego Convention Center. The white PTFE (Polytetrafluoroethylene) coated roofing membrane, a product of Birdair Inc., New York and fabricated in Tijuana, Mexico, was chosen as it allowed natural light in, was structurally lightweight, acoustically neutral and thermally efficient. It was also used at the Denver International Airport.

In May 2001, Ralph Nieders became GAP's cross-border project manager and on June 8, 2001, was assigned to Ernesto Ruffo Appel, Mexico's Presidential Commissioner for North Border Projects (Comision Presidencial Para Asuntos de la Frontera Norte, REF:CAFN-COM-01-010) as the project's liaison and briefed Rear Admiral Jose L. Betancourt, Commander, Navy Region Southwest, the San Diego Airspace Users Group and the FAA Southern California TRACON (Terminal Radar Approach Control Facilities) on the expansion plans and capacity of the Tijuana airport. Based on prior designs and concepts, GAP built a scale architectural model of the cross-border terminal which was displayed at the Tijuana airport, and a bilingual information booklet and CD authored by Ralph Nieders was produced containing detailed designs and a narrative of passenger movements, amenities and customs/immigration processing.

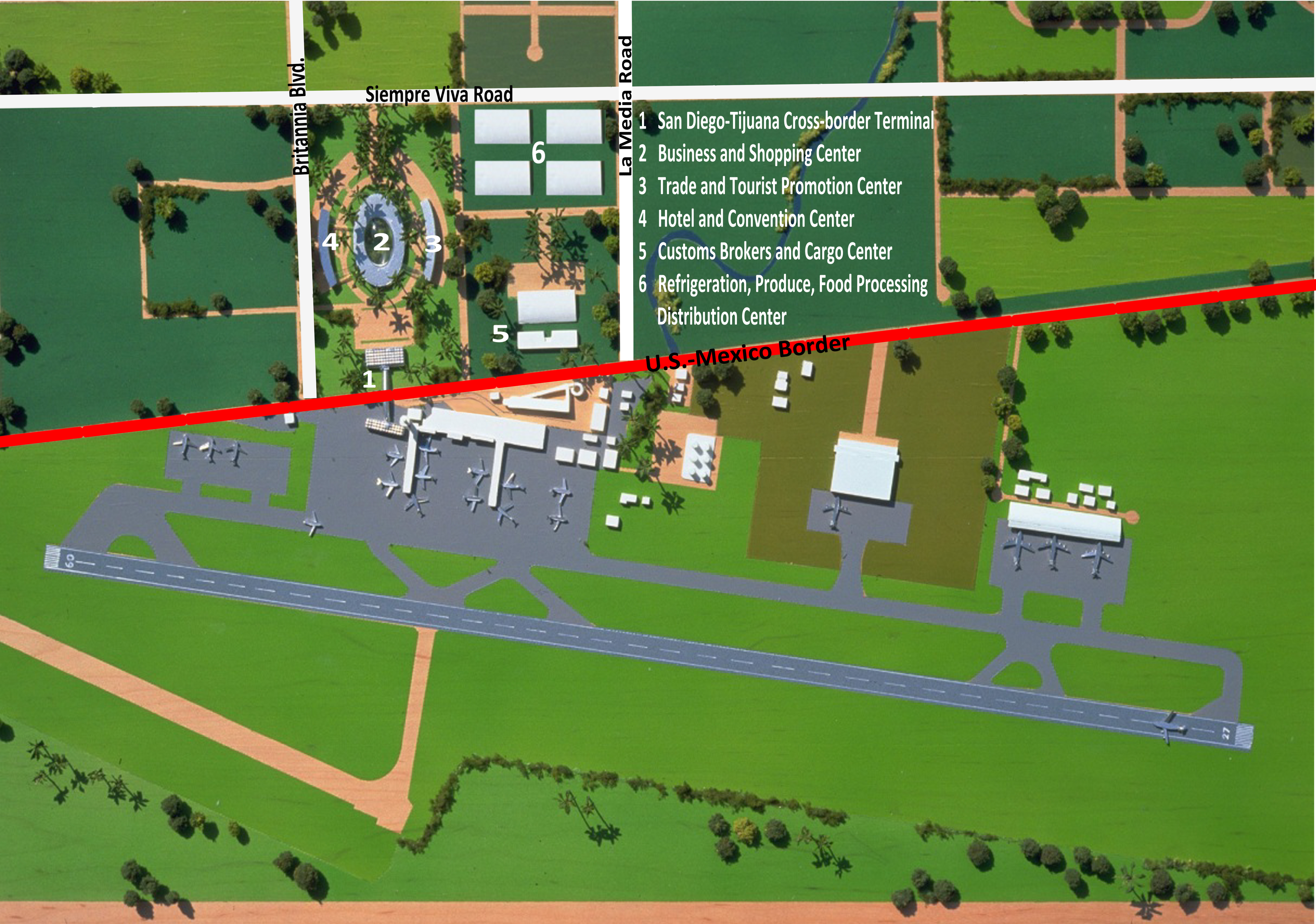
Image 14: Vázquez Raña Tijuana Airport Cross-border Terminal and Commerce Center, 2001

With growing air traffic in the Pacific region and limited runway and terminal expansion potential at major West coast airports, the FAA became interested in the development of the Tijuana cross-border terminal. The FAA offered a $50 million U.S. dollar grant based on the submission of a full business plan and designs. As part of this initiative, Ralph Nieders and AENA (Aeropuertos Españoles y Navegación Aérea, at the time the minority Spanish GAP stockholder) developed a preliminary design as shown by image 14 (Vázquez Raña Tijuana Airport Cross-border Terminal and Commerce Center) using Britannia Blvd as the main entrance to the cross-border terminal. As airports have become commercial and business hubs, the cross-border terminal project was to incorporate a multifaceted enterprise district through direct investments, joint-ventures and business alliances. The multi-facet concept on Otay Mesa was based on the success of such companies as Delimex (acquired by Heinz), the movement of 19 billion dollars of goods (including a billion dollars of produce/fruits and processed foods) and over two thousand commercial trucks crossing daily through the Otay Mesa Port of Entry in 2000. With the cross-border terminal as an anchor tenant and Otay Mesa's designation as an Enterprise and Free Trade Zone, a convention center with an office/retail area was envisioned to promote not only cross-border products but also services such as insurance and medical care. As part of the development strategy, the ongoing dispute with the former Ejido Tampico was to be settled and the Autonomous University of Baja California, Tijuana which is adjacent to the Tijuana airport was being considered as the potential site for Grupo Empresarial Ángeles new regional Hospital Angeles similar to UC San Diego Health campus that combined medical care and research. Having made Grupo Empresarial Ángeles into Mexico premier business hospitality and healthcare provider through its Camino Real hotel and Hospitales Angeles chains, Olegario Vázquez Raña wanted to create a signature project that would showcase cross-border commerce, cooperation and vision. Ralph Nieders had met with Frank Goldberg, owner of Britannia Commerce Center (22 acres) who indicated an interest in developing the cross-border terminal and had an extensive commercial/development background in San Diego that included Price Club (acquired by Costco) and Jack in the Box, and discussions for a business alliance were initiated between Grupo Empresarial Ángeles and Sharp Healthcare. To secure the phased development, Robert Casey/Casey Development negotiated with Peter Darby/Pema Properties a listing price of $5 million (U.S. dollars) for the 62-acre Martinez Trust property (San Diego parcel number APN 667-060-02) adjacent to Britannia Commerce Center and across for the Tijuana airport's cargo area, but the Spanish partners within GAP refused to make any financial or development agreements for the Tijuana cross-border terminal project. Differences on development and financial strategies between Olegario Vázquez Raña/Grupo Empresarial Ángeles and the Spanish investors continued to escalate and on June 27, 2001, Olegario Vázquez Raña decided not to continue with GAP and sold his AMP shares to Holdinmex S.A. de C.V. which then became the Mexican strategic investor. With no stake in GAP, Olegario Vázquez Raña (Grupo Empresarial Ángeles) did not acquire the designated cross-border property (image 19, Martinez Trust, San Diego parcel number APN 667-060-02) on Otay Mesa and withdrew from the development of the Tijuana cross-border terminal. The Hospital Angeles Tijuana was then built in Tijuana's Zona Rio and became the city's premier hospital facility and medical center.

The change in both the management of GAP and the Mexican strategic partner at AMP led to a change in development strategies for the Tijuana airport. GAP opted not to pursue the FAA grant application and did not reply to Caltrans' requests for traffic data required to redesign the Britannia Blvd. and La Media Road access ramps on State Route 905 to support the development of cross-border terminal. As the cross-border passenger terminal was not part of the original GAP airport concession and development plan approved by the SCT (Mexico's Ministry of Communications and Transportation) and ASA (Mexico's airport authority) in 1999, Holdinmex and the Spanish concession holders at GAP were not required to pursue or develop the project. In July, 2001, Ralph Nieders was asked to resign as GAP's cross-border project manager. The designated site for the cross-border terminal on the U.S. side was not secured and in August 2001, GAP suspended the project. Gilberto Valenzuela and Ralph Nieders then met with ASA's director Ernesto Velasco Leon. ASA assumed the cross-border terminal project. Gilberto Valenzuela and Casey Development/Nieders continued to work directly with ASA's director Ernesto Velasco Leon, and privately promoted the project.

== 2002–2004: Partnership for Prosperity/Mexico's Presidential Commissioner on Northern Projects/Drug Tunnels ==
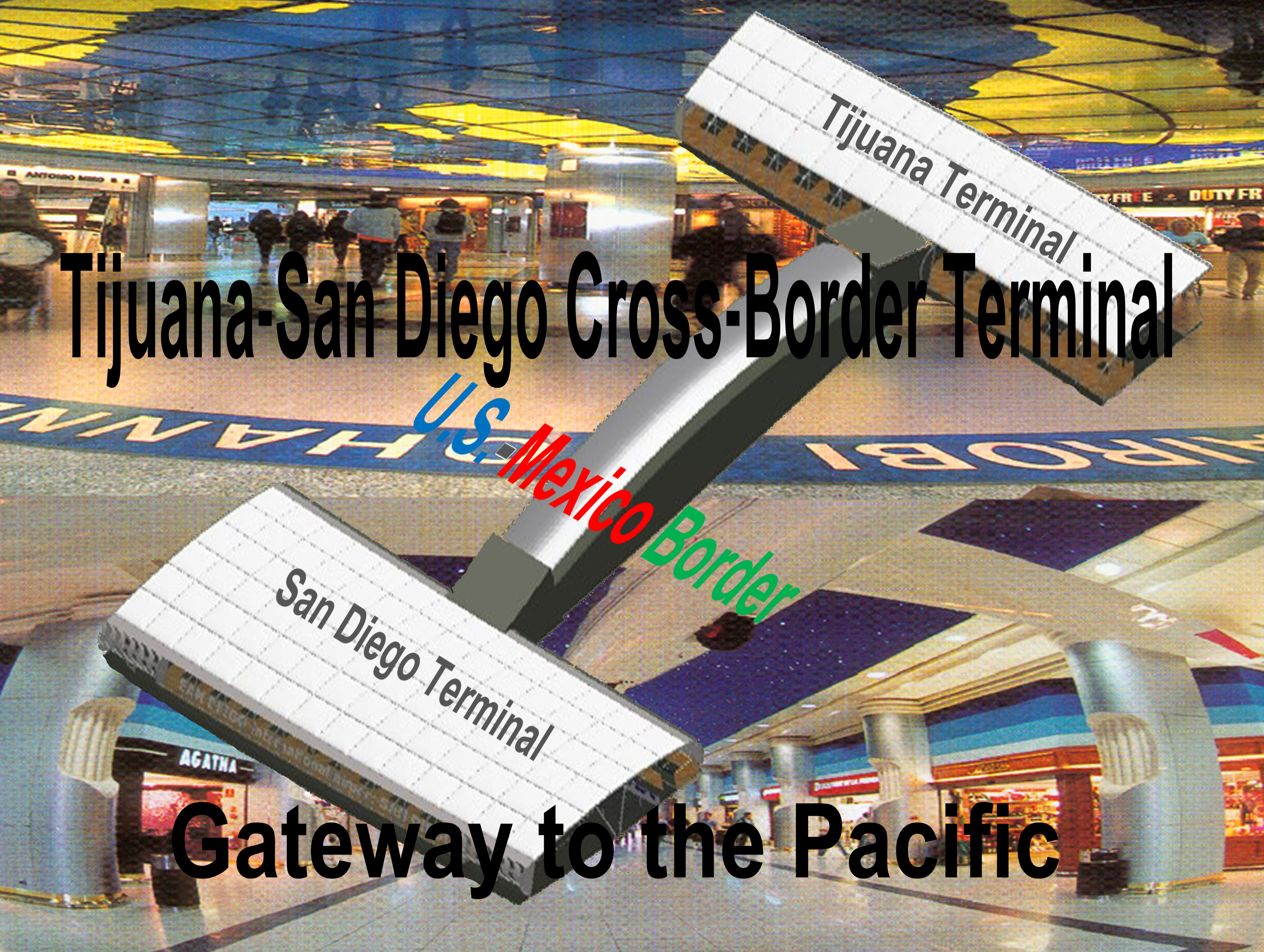
Image 15: Tijuana cross-border terminal concept presented at the Partnership for Prosperity in Washington, D.C., 2002

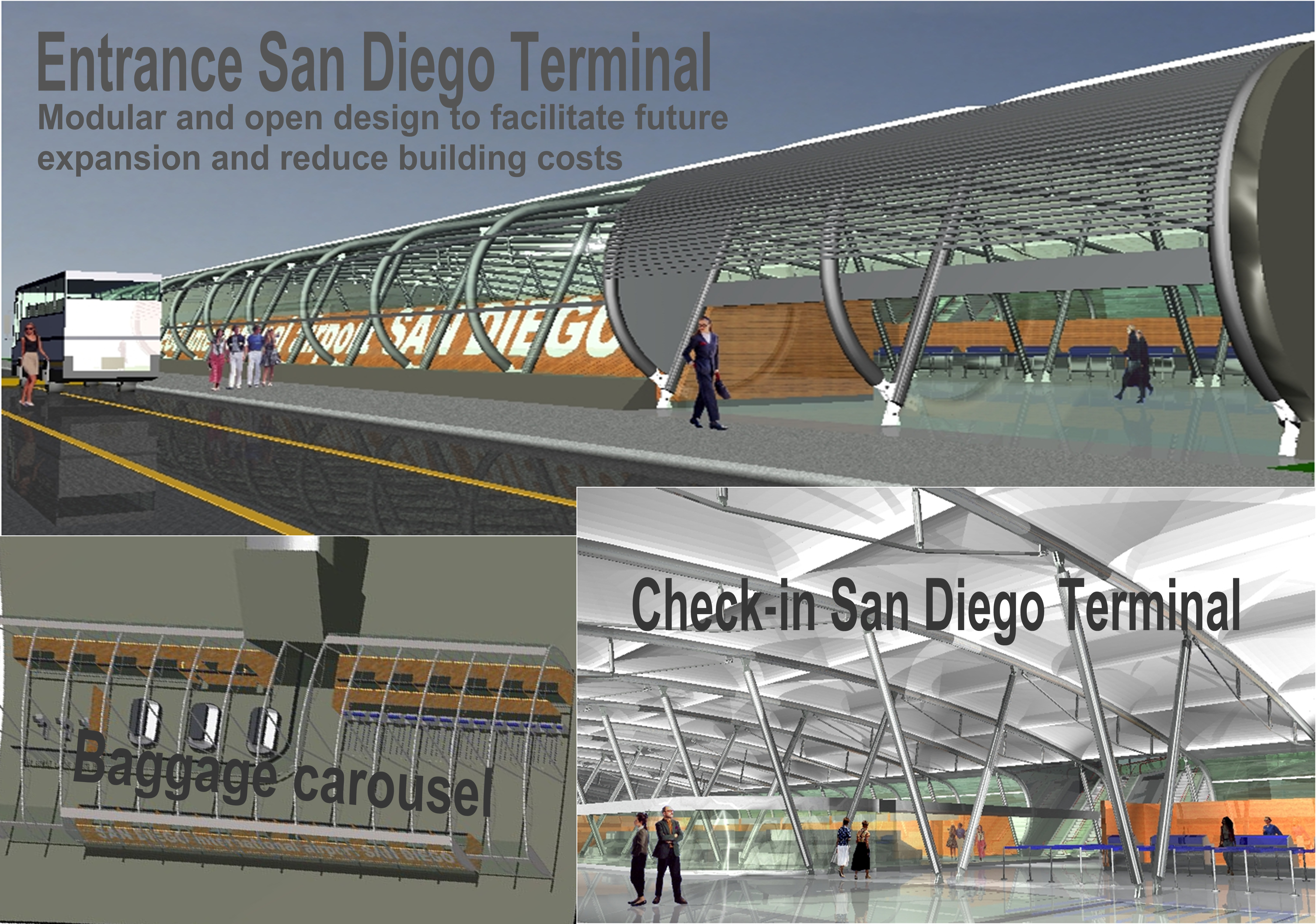
Image 16: Tijuana cross-border terminal modular design concept presented at the Partnership for Prosperity in Washington, D.C. , 2002

In the aftermath of Al-Qaeda's attack on New York's World Trade Center on September 11, 2001, and seeking to showcase cooperation and development between Mexico and the United States, in January 2002, the U.S. Department of State invited Casey Development/Nieders to present the Tijuana cross-border passenger terminal project before the Bush-Fox presidential commission known as the Partnership for Prosperity. As shown by image 15 and image 16, a special booklet and CD were prepared for the Deputy Secretary of the Treasury Kenneth W. Dam, the Under Secretary of State for Economic Growth, Energy, and the Environment Alan Larson, and panel members. The Tijuana cross-border terminal was selected to be part of the Bush-Fox agenda to be presented at the U.S.-Mexico Presidential Summit held in Monterrey, Mexico, on March 22, 2002, which also included a U.N. International Conference on Financing for Development. Both ASA and GAP were unable to make any commitment towards the cross-border passenger terminal, which was then withdrawn from the Presidential summit's agenda.

In July 2002, Mexico's Presidential Commissioner for Northern Projects, Ernesto Ruffo Appel, confirmed that internal management problems and failure by the GAP investment group to meet "the spirit of the concession", made the Tijuana cross-border terminal not "a good business idea". He went further to state that efforts were under way to build a cargo airport approximately 60 miles south of Tijuana, which could also "carry passengers". While continuing to claim support for the development of a cross-border terminal, both the Mexican government and the GAP concession holders failed to meet with San Diego officials or make any financial commitment towards promotional materials, studies or the acquisition of land.

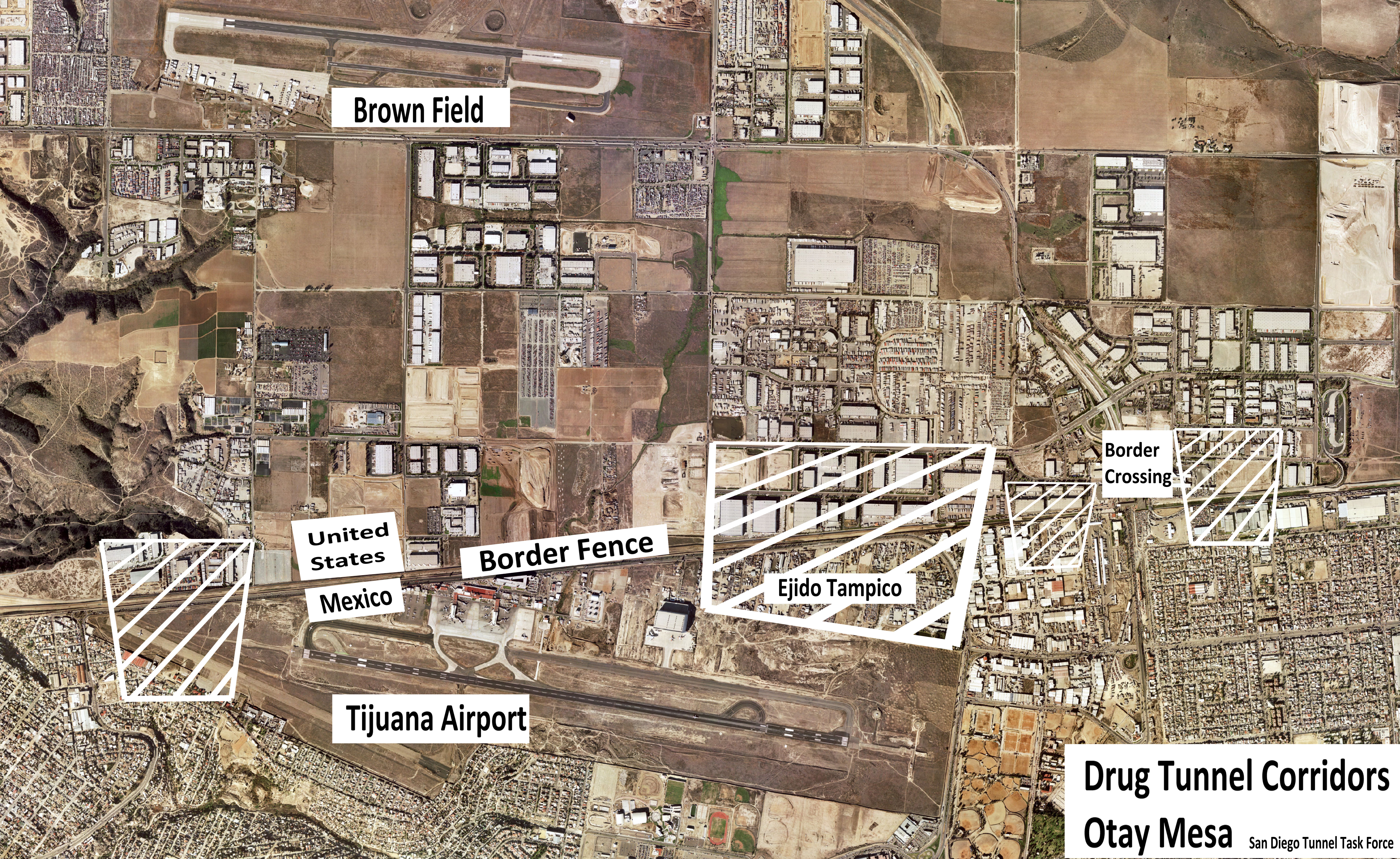
Image 17: Drug tunnel corridors Tijuana airport/Otay Mesa

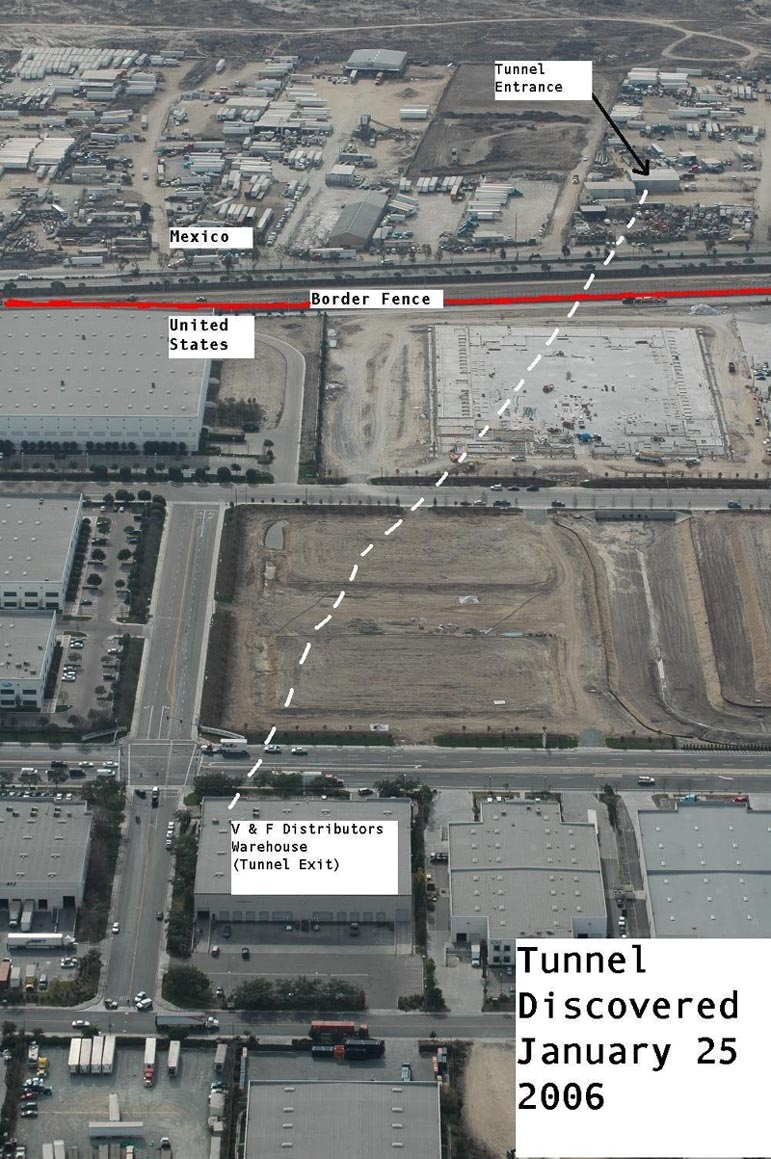
Image 18: Sinaloa Cartel Tijuana airport/Ejido Tampico Drug Tunnel 2006

The ongoing dispute between the Mexican government and the former Ejido Tampico occupying 79 hectares (200 acres) of the Tijuana airport had also not been resolved. As shown by image 13, adding to the problems was the former Ejido’s rapid unpermitted urbanization of the occupied property. The introduction of more dwellings and businesses on the property increased the threshold for violent conflict. As shown by image 17, the problems were further aggravated by the increased use of drug tunnels along the Otay Mesa U.S.-Mexico border. The former Ejido Tampico's proximity to the U.S.-Mexico border attracted elements of the Tijuana and Sinaloa Drug Cartels which threatened both the security and safety of aircraft operations and passengers at the Tijuana airport. As shown by image 13 and image 18, with unregulated trucking and warehouse operations, the former Ejido Tampico had become a major distribution point for narcotics being moved into the United States. In the ensuing years, drug tunnels moving tons of narcotics were detected and closed from the former Ejido Tampico technically within the Tijuana airport's boundary to warehouses located on Otay Mesa in San Diego, California. At the westerly end of the Tijuana Airport a 612-yard (560-meter) drug tunnel equipped with an elevator and electric rail cars to ferry narcotics across the U.S.-Mexico border was also discovered dug under the airport's 10/28 runway from a warehouse located 300 meters (330 yards) from Mexico's 12th Military Air Base and 100 meters (110 yards) from a Mexican Federal Police station.

In July 2003, Mexico's Presidential Commissioner Ernesto Ruffo Appel resigned due to health issues but shortly afterwards became a consultant promoting the development of a "mega-port" close to Ensenada, Mexico, and the creation of a transportation corridor that would move "cargo by land, sea and air" between Mexico and the United States through Mexicali, Mexico and Yuma, Arizona. The project would have created an alternative to the Tijuana airport and competed for the same regional air cargo and passenger traffic.

Gilberto Valenzuela Ezquerro and Casey Development/Nieders continued to privately promote the Tijuana cross-border terminal meeting with U.S. landowners of the potential crossing sites and with Mexico's Under-Secretary of the SCT, Dr. Aaron Dychter and ASA's Director Ernesto Velasco Leon. Casey Development/Nieders also continued to represent the project as a member of the Airport Site Selection Public Working Group before the San Diego County Regional Airport Authority from 2001 to 2006.

== 2005–2008: Land acquisition ==
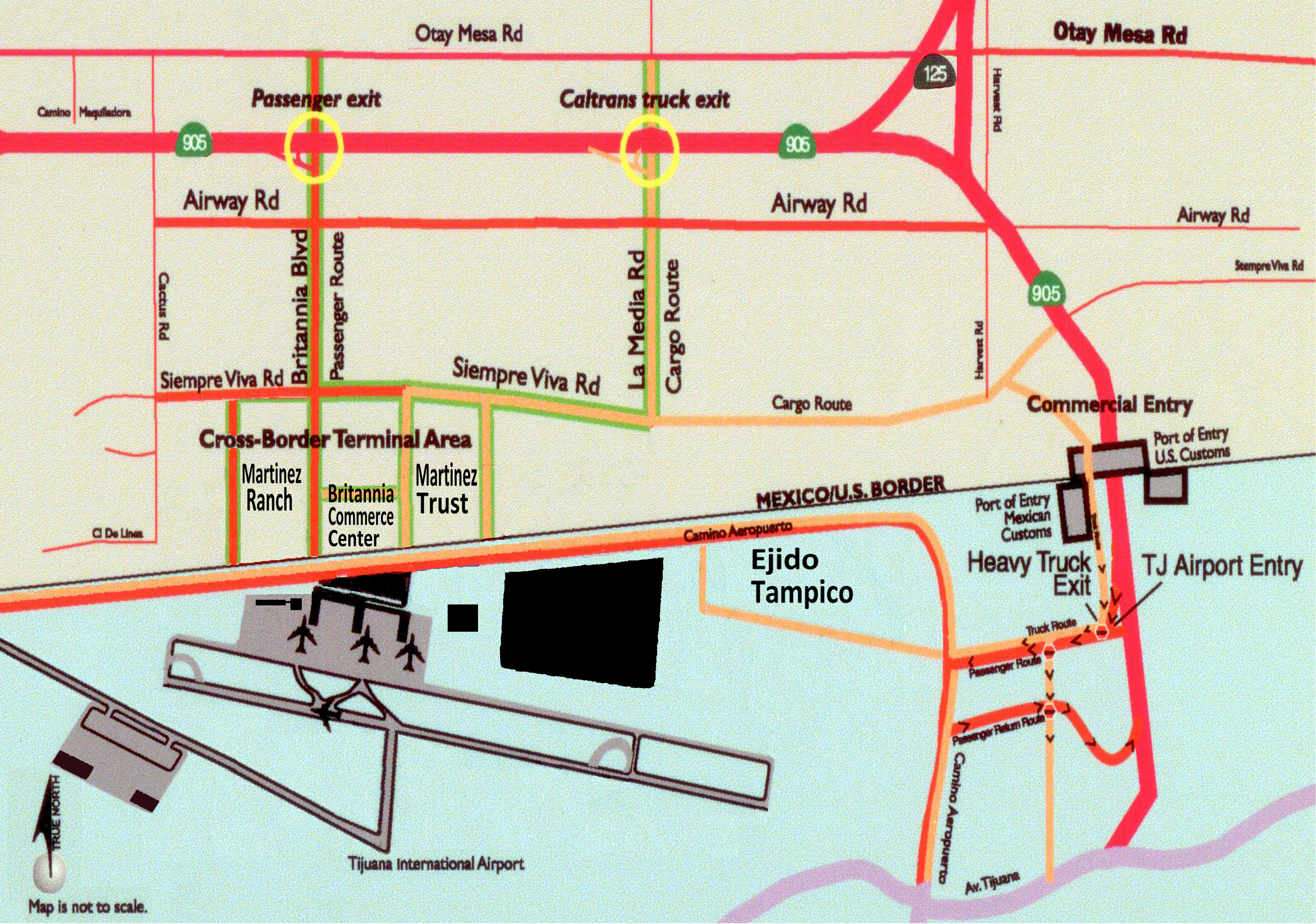
Image 19: Map of Tijuana cross-border terminal land options and supporting infrastructure

In January 2005, Martinez Ranch (the original cross-border terminal site, i.e. Mexicana de Aviación 1989 and Aerocharter 1991, parcel number APN 667-050-07) was acquired by Britannia Industrial Center, LP. Christopher McKellar, president of Britannia Industrial Center contacted Casey Development/Nieders in February 2005 to determine the potential development of a cross-border terminal. In April 2005, Ernesto Velasco Leon, director of ASA, and Enrique Valle Alvarez, director of the Tijuana airport, were briefed by Ralph Nieders on the renewed interest for a cross-border terminal. In June 2005, Pedro Cerisola y Weber, Mexico's Secretary of the SCT, Dr. Aaron Dychter, Under-Secretary of the SCT, and Rodolfo Salgado, in charge of preparing the IPO (initial public offering) for GAP, were also briefed on the renewed interest and its potential value to the IPO. Jaime de la Rosa, Chairman of AMP, and Carlos del Rio, General Director of GAP were then contacted, and Enrique Valle, director of the Tijuana airport was asked to determine San Diego's interest. Image 19 shows the three cross-border property options and their location with respect to the supporting infrastructure.

In September 2005, Enrique Valle, as the director of the Tijuana airport, and Nieders, as the former project manager for the cross-border terminal at GAP, jointly briefed the San Diego Chamber of Commerce. Enrique Valle indicated that GAP was interested in the development of a cross-border terminal but could not commit any resources to the acquisition of land or the construction of the terminal on the U.S. side. Encouraged by GAP's position, Mark Grosvenor, principal partner in the Britannia Industrial Center, LP, continued to hold a portion of the Martinez Ranch for the development of a cross-border terminal. During this time, the San Diego County Regional Airport Authority was also studying the development of a "joint-use" (military/civilian) airport at the Naval Air Station North Island and the Marine Corps Air Station Miramar to meet San Diego's future air demand. Both options were opposed by base commanders. As opposition against a joint-use airport grew in San Diego, interest in the cross-border terminal was generated.

In November 2005, Malin Burnham, chairman of Burnham Companies, arranged a conference with Thella Bowens, chief executive officer and President of the San Diego County Regional Airport Authority, with the objective of "land-banking" sufficient property to allow for a cross-border terminal. Attending were Christopher McKellar/Mark Grosvenor (Martinez Ranch), Frank Goldberg (Britannia Commerce Center), and Nieders (member of the Airport Site Selection Public Working Group representing the cross-border terminal). A general consensus failed as the San Diego County Regional Airport Authority felt that support for a cross-border terminal option was premature and could negatively impact the airport selection process for developing a joint military/civilian airport at the Marine Corps Air Station Miramar. To keep the cross-border option open, Christopher McKellar/Mark Grosvenor agreed to continue holding two parcels of Martinez Ranch adjacent to the U.S.-Mexico border for the development of a cross-border terminal. With two parcels of the Martinez Ranch held in reserve, on November 16, 2005, President Vicente Fox visited the Tijuana airport and a direct request was made by Ralph Nieders/Casey Development to address the issues of the "Cross-Border Terminal". The Mexican National Palace established a folio, (Palacio Nacional, FOLIO:201457543-61) and redirected the request to Pedro Cerisola y Weber, Secretary of the SCT (Ministry of Communications and Transportation).

In December 2005, a San Diego/Baja California Mission headed by Mexican Senator Hector Osuna Jaime and U.S. Congressman Darrell Issa traveled to Mexico City and included the cross-border terminal on their agenda. Adding momentum to the cross-border terminal was a change of the Mexican strategic partners at GAP/AMP authorized by Mexico's Ministry of Communications and Transportation (SCT) and prior changes within the Spanish investment group at GAP as Grupo ACS (Actividades de Construcción y Servicios) S. A. de C.V. had acquired Dragados in 2002 and in September 2005 became the largest shareholder within Union Fenosa. On January 17, 2006, the Mexican strategic partner Holdinmex S.A. de C.V. was officially replaced by Controladora Mexicana de Aeropuertos S.A. de C.V. Controladora Mexicana de Aeropuertos headed by Eduardo Sanchez-Navarro Redo, Carlos Laviada Ocejo and his wife Laura Diez-Barroso Azcarraga, indicated interest in the development of the Tijuana cross-border terminal.

On January 18, 2006, Gilberto Lopez Meyer, General Director of the Under-Ministry of Transportation of the Civil Aviation Administration(Subsecretaria de Transporte, Direccion General de Aeronautica Civil 101.095), contacted Ralph Nieders/Casey Development in reference to the Mexican National Palace folio (Palacio Nacional, FOLIO:201457543-61) to initiate a dialogue and study process for the "Cross Border Terminal".

In February 2006, interest for the Tijuana cross-border terminal rose further when the Department of the Navy formally rejected the concept of a joint-use airport with San Diego. In a letter addressed to Congresswoman Susan Davis, the Secretary of the Navy Donald C. Winter stated, "Navy and Marine Corps installations and ranges in the southwest United States form a tightly integrated military training complex that we use every day to prepare Marines, Sailors, Airmen, Soldiers and Coalition forces to fight American's wars, including the Global War on terror." He went further to state,"...Navy and Marine Corps leaders have continued to reinforce this message in letters to the San Diego County Regional Airport Authority (SDCRAA), and provided detailed explanations of why commercial aviation is not acceptable at MCB Camp Pendleton, MCAS Miramar, and NAS North Island."

Further supporting interest in the Tijuana cross-border terminal was the successful release of the GAP IPO in New York, which was followed by a major management change within GAP and AMP when Union Fenosa sold their shares in AMP to Controladora Mexicana de Aeropuertos, AENA and Grupo ACS. Gilberto Valenzuela Ezquerro, a long time friend of both the Sanchez-Navarro and Azcarraga families, contacted Eduardo Sanchez-Navarro Redo and arrangements were made for Christian Checa Levien, son-in-law of Laura Diez-Barroso Azcarraga de Laviada, to meet with Ralph Nieders to discuss the development of a cross-border terminal and land options. A private tour and meeting at San Diego International Airport was then arranged between Christian Checa Levien and Ralph Nieders by Theodore Sexton of the San Diego Regional Airport Authority. The three potential crossing sites Martinez Ranch, Britannia Commerce Center and Martinez Trust were discussed. Meetings then followed with Christian Checa Levien, Ralph Nieders, Robert Casey of Casey Development and Christopher McKellar/Mark Grosvenor for Martinez Ranch, the original cross border terminal site in 1989.

Land negotiations on Martinez Ranch stalled and in May 2006, Mark Grosvenor, Malin Burnham and Ralph Nieders flew to Los Cabos, Baja California del Sur to meet directly with the new AMP/GAP strategic partners Eduardo Sanchez-Navarro Redo, Carlos Laviada Ocejo and his wife Laura Diez-Barroso Azcarraga. For the Los Cabos meeting, an eighty-page report was prepared and submitted by Casey Development/Nieders outlining the history of the cross-border terminal, the Presidential permit process (which had been initiated by Casey Development/Nieders in 2000), and the City of San Diego planning and development process. The initial proposal was for a 60,000 square foot building connected to the Tijuana airport terminal through a 400-foot (120 m) passenger bridge. The total project value was estimated at $110 million U.S. dollars. The initial annual operating costs for U.S. Customs and Border Protection (CBP) was estimated at $8 million U.S. dollars to service 1.25 million passengers in the first year of operation. A strategic airport alliance between the Tijuana airport/GAP and the San Diego County Regional Airport Authority was also part of the cross-border terminal development proposal.

In June 2006, the AMP/GAP strategic partners failed to make a commitment on the two parcels of the Martinez Ranch held in reserve for the development of the cross-border terminal. In the 18-month period (January 2005 to June 2006) land values in Otay Mesa rose by almost 40 percent. With rising prices and real estate demand Christopher McKellar/Mark Grosvenor ended negotiations on the Martinez Ranch parcels held in reserve for the cross-border terminal and proceeded with the development of Martinez Ranch Business Park. Direct negotiations between the AMP strategic partners and Frank Goldberg for the Britannia Commerce Center site also failed as Frank Goldberg showed no interest in selling. In 2001, Nieders had met with Frank Goldberg who offered to build the cross-border terminal for a percentage of the Tijuana airport's gross revenue which was not accepted by GAP, and in 1991, Frank Goldberg had also been contacted during the Aerocharter negotiations as his property offered the shortest span for a passenger bridge to the Tijuana airport and the most direct entry for a cross-border terminal through Britannia Boulevard and California State Route 905 as shown by image 19. With two of the three potential cross-border terminal sites no longer available, Casey Development/Nieders then arranged for Christan Checa Levien and Diego Sanchez-Navarro (son of Eduardo Sanchez-Navarro) to meet with James Waring, Deputy Chief Operating Officer of San Diego Mayor Jerry Sanders, San Diego Councilman Ben Hueso representing Otay Mesa (cross-border location), and Emil Wohl of Otay Pacific Development LLC, which had acquired the Martinez Trust property (the 1998 Casey Development/SACSA cross-border terminal site, APN 667-060-02). Initial negotiations stalled and site development of the property continued.

In November 2006, Chicago based Equity Group Investments (EGI) headed by Sam Zell, who had invested in GAP's IPO, entered as a potential investor for the cross-border terminal. David Contis, representing EGI, was briefed by Christian Checa Levien and Nieders, and given a tour of the Martinez Trust property (APN 667-060-02) and then in conjunction with Enrique Valle, at the time director of the Tijuana airport, a tour of the airport and a view of the potential crossing site from the Mexico side. In just six months, because of site improvements and market speculation, the listing price of Martinez Trust had risen by almost 30 percent, placing the project in jeopardy. Land negotiations on parcel APN 667-060-02 (Martinez Trust) followed in 2007.

On March 18, 2007, Gilberto Valenzuela Ezquerro, who as Mexico's Minister of Public Works (Secretario de Obras Publicas) had first proposed building a bi-national airport between Tijuana and San Diego in 1965 and joined Nieders in 1992, died after a prolonged illness. Nieders left Casey Development and continued working directly with Emil Wohl, the Mexican strategic partners and EGI during the land acquisition process. Land negotiations were concluded in 2008 with an acquisition price of $34.5 million U.S. dollars. In 2008, Otay-Tijuana Venture LLC was created between the Mexican strategic partners and EGI to build and develop the Tijuana cross-border passenger terminal. The cross-border terminal originally proposed in 2001 which included a commercial and distribution center as shown by image 14 (Tijuana Airport Cross-border Terminal and Commerce Center, 2001) was scaled back to a toll bridge concept.

== 2008-2014: Project Smart Border/Presidential Permit/CBP ==
In 2008, authorities from both Mexico and the United States launched Project Smart Border 2010, with the expressed intent to facilitate travel and trade within the San Diego/Tijuana region. With regional support and having acquired the Martinez Trust property (APN 667-060-02), Otay-Tijuana Venture LLC initiated the Presidential Permit process.

On July 15, 2010, a Presidential Permit for the San Diego-Tijuana Airport Cross Border facility was signed by Robert D. Hormats, then Under-Secretary of State for Economic, Energy, and Agricultural Affairs and issued to Otay-Tijuana Venture LLC with an effective date of August 3, 2010. Then-Secretary of State Hillary Clinton provided support with an initial groundbreaking which at that time was expected to take place in late 2013.

With the Presidential Permit secured, Otay-Tijuana Venture LLC sought to have CBP (U.S. Customs and Border Protection) cover the operating costs of Federal employees required to operate the private border crossing. The estimated $8 million U.S. dollar CBP operating budget disclosed during the failed negotiations on the Martinez Ranch property, (Christopher McKellar/Mark Grosvenor, parcel number APN 667-050-07), had also been submitted to EGI by Ralph Nieders during the Martinez Trust property negotiations (APN 667-060-02) in 2006. As a private border crossing, CBP required all costs be borne by the developer.

Security issues continued at the Tijuana airport as a kidnapping ring was reported operating in conjunction with corrupt Mexican Federal agents in 2013. Narcotics smuggling also continued within the airport's vicinity as more drug tunnels were discovered.

Building of the Tijuana cross-border terminal was delayed as Otay-Tijuana Venture LLC sought to reverse the CBP's position that the cost of staffing be covered by the developer. Unable to reverse the CBP position, in April 2014, Otay-Tijuana Venture LLC agreed to pay for the employees of CBP and build the crossing facility.

== 2014-2025: Cross Border Xpress ==
Construction at the Tijuana airport began in October 2013, while work on the U.S. side began in June 2014. The project had an initial estimated cost of US$78 million and a final cost of US$120 million, funded by Mexican and U.S. private investors organized as Otay-Tijuana Venture LLC and Grupo Aeroportuario del Pacífico (GAP), the operator of Tijuana International Airport. Building E of Tijuana's Terminal 1 was modified to support the bridge structure on the Mexican side. During construction, U.S. construction cranes and prefabricated bridge sections crossed the international border under a temporary bilateral waiver issued by the United States and Mexico.

The main contractor for the terminal was Turner Construction. The prime architect and facility designer was Stantec, with Ricardo Legorreta of Legorreta+Legorreta serving as associate architect. The civil engineer was Latitude 33 Planning and Engineering, while structural engineering was provided by Hope Amundson Structural Engineers and Kleinfelder.

The Tijuana cross-border terminal was renamed Cross Border Xpress (CBX) and opened to passenger service on December 9, 2015. An official opening ceremony was held on April 7, 2016, attended by Congressmember Susan Davis, Mexico's Secretary of Communications and Transportation Gerardo Ruiz Esparza, and the mayors of Tijuana and San Diego.

In 2016, the project received awards from Engineering News-Record, including a Global Award for Merit and the California Airports/Transit Best Project award.

In November 2025, Otay-Tijuana Venture LLC reached an agreement to sell CBX to GAP, for $2.2 billion. GAP stated that the acquisition would integrate CBX into its airport network and support future development on the U.S. side of the border.
