= John R. Beckett =

- Born: John R. Beckett; 26 February 1918; San Francisco, California, United States
- Died: 17 June 2010 (aged 92); Atherton, California, United States
- Resting place: USA
- Occupation: Businessman
- Spouses: Dina Calkin Beckett; Marjorie Beckett
- Children: Brenda Beckett; Belinda Becket

John R. Beckett (1918–2010), an American businessman, was president and chairman of the board of Transamerica Corp. from 1960 to 1983.

== Biographical Information ==
He was born on February 26, 1918, in San Francisco, California, and died on June 17, 2010, in Atherton, California.

== Career ==
He became president and chairman of the board of Transamerica Corporation in 1960 when it was a little-known holding company. He was CEO of Transamerica Corp. for 23 years, until 1983, he transformed it from an anonymous holding company into a major, diversified, operating company that became a household name.

He embarked the company on an aggressive advertising campaign that propelled the Transamerica brand name into a household name to the general public. He increased Transamerica's earnings by 20-fold during his tenure as president and chairman. It grew to be one of the 100 largest companies in the United States. He was instrumental in the purchases of motion picture distributor United Artists, Transamerica Airlines, Budget Rent-a-Car Co., De Laval Turbine and Occidental Life Insurance.

He commissioned the construction of the Transamerica Pyramid, a landmark building in the San Francisco Financial District. Construction of the Transamerica Pyramid began in 1969. The 853-foot pyramid-shaped skyscraper designed by architect William Pereira was intended to become San Francisco's tallest building, and its construction created instant controversy, which helped create public awareness of Transamerica. The Transamerica Pyramid is located in the heart of the San Francisco Financial District at 600 Montgomery Street in San Francisco, California. It is a part of Transamerica Center (a complex that includes Two Transamerica Center and Transamerica Redwood Park) and encompasses nearly one city block.

He was named "Best Chief Executive Officer" of all U.S. financial organizations for the years 1977 and 1978 by Financial World.

== Family ==
He was married first to Dian Calkin Beckett (who died before him) and then to Marjorie Beckett, his wife of 41 years. He had two daughters Brenda Beckett of Friday Harbor, Washington; and, Belinda Beckett of Sacramento, California. He also had two stepsons: Ted of Los Angeles; and Donald Abenheim of Menlo Park. Two granddaughters: Diana Beckett-Hile of Mill Valley and Sarah Beckett-Hile of San Francisco.
