= Donald Abenheim =

American military historian (born 1953)

Donald Abenheim (born April 9, 1953 in San Francisco) is an American military historian. Abenheim received a PhD degree in European history from Stanford University in 1985 and founded the Center for Civil Military Relations (CCMR) at the Naval Postgraduate School.
