= García de León family =

García de León
- Current region: Mexico
- Members: Dionisio Meade y Garcia de Leon; Héctor Hernández Cervantes; José Antonio Meade Kuribreña
- Connected families: Meade, de la Madrid, Slim family

The García de León family is an extended Mexican grand family. They are one of the most influential families in Mexican politics and business. The Garcia de Leon and their descendants have consistently produced political dynasties. They can be compared to the Kennedy family and the Bush family of the United States.

== Notable family members ==
Many Garcia de Leon family members are influential in local or national business and politics in Mexico, the US, and France.

- José Antonio Meade Kuribreña
- Dionisio Meade y Garcia de Leon
- Héctor Hernández Cervantes, spouse of Raquel Garcia de Leon y Avellaneda
- Alfredo de Sarachaga, spouse of Lidia Garcia de Leon y Avellaneda
- Luis Maximilano Meade, spouse of Gracia Garcia de Leon y Avellaneda
- Mauricio de Maria y Campos, spouse of Patricia Meade y Garcia de Leon
