= Óscar Mario Beteta =

Mexican economist and journalist (1956–2026)

Óscar Mario Beteta Vallejo (Note: In this Mexican name, the surname is Beteta and the second or maternal family name is Vallejo.) (13 January 1956 – 9 September 2026) was a Mexican economist and journalist. For 30 years, he hosted the morning news show En los tiempos de la radio on the stations of the Radio Fórmula network.

== Early life and work ==
Óscar Mario Beteta was born in Mexico City on 13 January 1956. He studied economics at the Universidad Anáhuac and later earned a master's degree in finance at the University of Exeter in the United Kingdom. Before becoming a broadcaster, he worked in the financial sector: as a stockbroker and for several commercial banks.

His career as a journalist began with Canal Once, where he hosted a newscast focused on stock-market developments. He later moved to Canal 40, where he hosted the interview and analysis programme Visión 40. From 1994 to February 2024, he hosted Radio Fórmula's influential morning news show En los tiempos de la radio, which was broadcast nationwide and was also followed in the southern United States. With a total of 7,895 weekday broadcasts – 7:00 to 11:30, Monday to Friday – it was one of Mexico's top three radio programmes in audience terms. After leaving Radio Fórmula, he continued to host the afternoon show El Heraldo de la tarde on El Heraldo Radio.

As a columnist, his articles appeared in a range of newspapers, including El Financiero, El Universal and Milenio.

== Personal life and death ==
Óscar Mario Beteta was born into a family with strong political ties. His grandfather, Ignacio Beteta, was head of the Presidential General Staff (EMP) and secretary of public education under President Lázaro Cárdenas. His great-uncle, Ramón Beteta, served as Miguel Alemán's secretary of finance and public credit, and his uncle, Mario Ramón Beteta, held the same position under Luis Echeverría and was later governor of the State of Mexico.

He was married three times, lastly in 2024, and had four children from his previous marriages.

Beteta died while hospitalised for cancer treatment in Mexico City, on 9 September 2026, at the age of 70.
