= Arturo Herrera =

Arturo Herrera may refer to:

- Arturo Herrera (artist) (born 1959), Chilean artist
- Arturo Herrera (politician) (born 1967), Mexican politician
