= Gerardo Rodriguez Regordosa =

Mexican economist (born 1972)

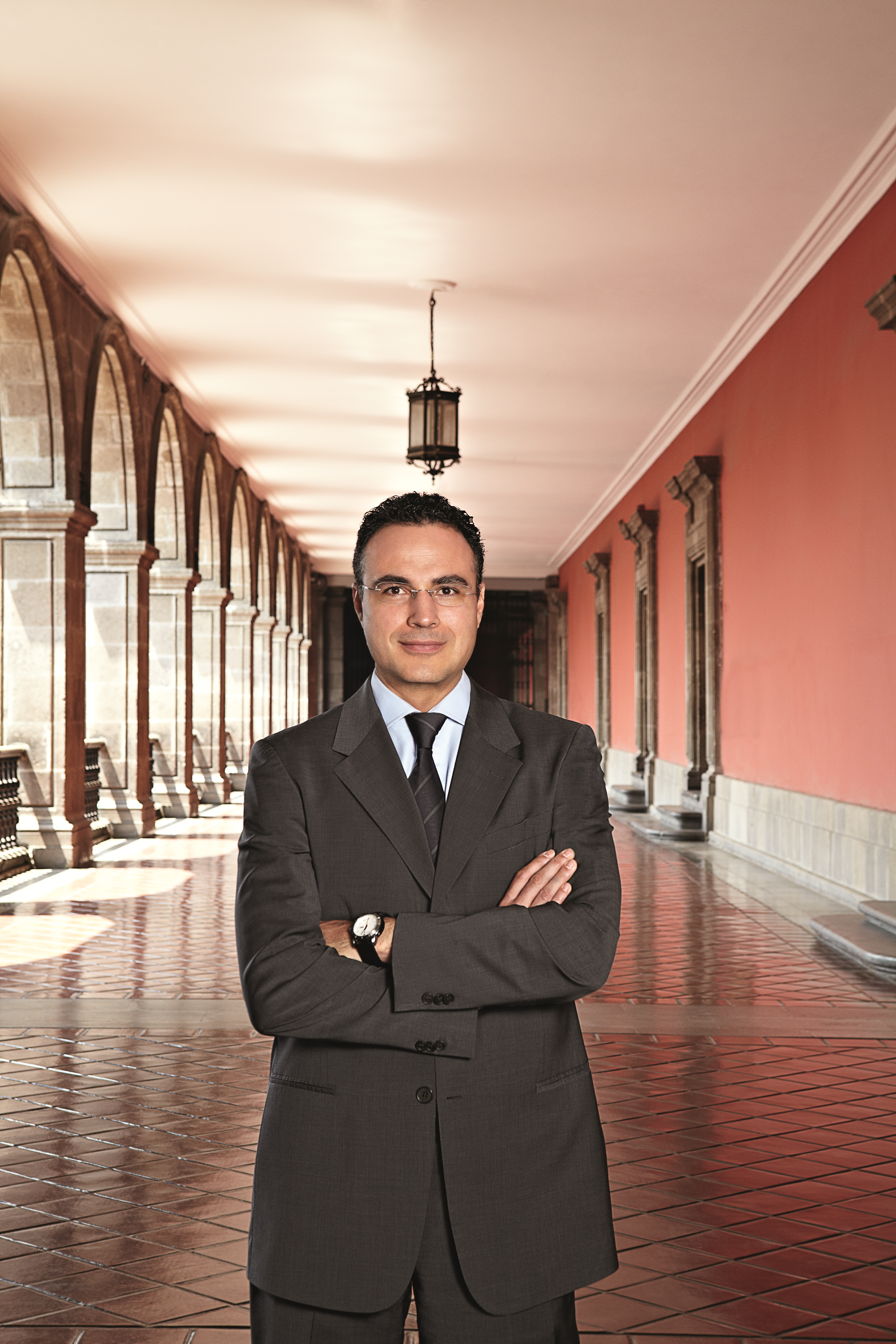
- In office January 19, 2011 – November 30, 2012
- Preceded by: José Antonio Meade Kuribreña
- Succeeded by: Fernando Aportela Rodríguez

Head of Public Credit
- In office January 2005 – January 2011

Personal details
- Born: July 10, 1972 (age 54) Puebla de Zaragoza, Puebla, Mexico
- Education: Universidad de las Américas Puebla, Stanford University
- Occupation: Portfolio Manager, Economist, Policy Maker
- Website: Twitter

Gerardo Rodriguez Regordosa (born July 10, 1972 in Puebla, Mexico) is an economist from Universidad de las Americas Puebla (UDLA-P), with a master's degree in Engineering-Economic Systems and Operations Research from Stanford University. Gerardo is currently a Portfolio Manager and Head of Product Strategy for BlackRock’s Systematic Investment Team. Prior to joining BlackRock he spent more than 14 years at the Mexican Ministry of Finance and Public Credit where he served most recently as Undersecretary of Finance and Public Credit from January 2011 to November 2012.

== Education ==
He was awarded a bachelor's degree in Economics from Universidad de las Américas-Puebla and a Master´s degree in Engineering-Economic Systems and Operations Research from Stanford University, in the United States.

A sports enthusiast, he was granted a sports scholarship from his alma mater between 1991 and 1996 for being a member of the varsity basketball team.

== Professional career ==
Gerardo Rodriguez joined BlackRock in 2013 as a Managing Director in the Emerging Markets group. He is currently a Portfolio Manager with broad responsibilities including the Total Emerging Markets Fund. Gerardo is also regularly engaged in the production of though leadership content on Emerging Markets at BlackRock.

Prior to joining BlackRock Gerardo spent more than 14 years at the Mexican Ministry of Finance where he held several positions in areas related to public debt policy, risk management and financial system development. In the Ministry of Finance and Public Credit he worked from 2001 to 2004 as Deputy General Director for domestic debt, where he was responsible for the Federal Government financing in the local market as well as the promotion and development of the long term government bond market in local currency.

From January 2005 to January 2011 he served, within the same Ministry, as Head of the Public Credit Unit, after being ratified by Congress. During his tenure, he was responsible for the Federal Government’s financing operations in the international and local markets, and of authorizing the financing for public entities. He also was in charge of activities related with the development of infrastructure projects, especially through the National Infrastructure Fund.

Since its creation in 2008, the National Infrastructure Fund has supported more than 90 projects; this represents more than 7,800 million dollars to help finance new roads, water treatment plants, mass urban transport solutions, and other sectors, that would thereby detonate investments worth more than 17,450 million dollars.

During his tenure as Head of the Public Credit Unit, the program cetesdirecto was designed and launched as part of the strategy to promote savings and investment for small investors, allowing them to buy and sell government bonds in small quantities.

During this period, Mexico’s public debt management achievements received several awards and distinctions:

- Euromoney magazine 2006: awarded Mexico deal of the year for the issuance of 3 Warrant series that allowed the exchange of 2,500 million dollars.
- LatinFinance magazine 2007: awarded Mexico the “Best Sovereign Issuer” for both liability management transactions during the year, which allowed the Mexican government to extend the term and duration of external debt and improve the composition of Mexico´s debt portfolio, swapping foreign for internal debt.
- Euromoney magazine 2008: awarded Mexico with the “Emerging Market Sovereign Deal of the Year” for the issuance of the “Bono UMS 2019” bond worth 2,000 million dollars at a 5.95% rate during the financial crisis, as this bond marked the reopening of the dollar market to emerging economies. In addition, Emerging Markets publication awarded the Latin America 2008 Best Deal prize.
- Futures and Options World magazine 2009: awarded the Mexican Government the Most Innovative or Creative use of Derivatives award for oil coverage made to ensure budget revenues to 2009.
- The International Finance Review (IFR) 2010: awarded the prize to the best bonus in Yen denomination to the guaranteed bond by the Japan Bank for International Cooperation (JBIC) in December 2009. This bond represented Mexico´s return to the Japanese market and was the largest debt transaction carried out with a guarantee of JBIC.
- Euromoney magazine awarded: the Yen bond issue maturing in 2020 with the “Japan Deal of the Year” prize, as the second issue with JBIC guarantee, reinforcing the Government´s commitment to maintain presence in the Japanese market and diversify its stockholders base.
- October 2010, the Federal Government issued a 100 years bond, reaching the highest amount on record for that kind of transaction and also to Mexico becoming the first Latin American country to perform a transaction at this maturity date and the second sovereign issuer to do so.
- 2010 peso-denominated fixed rate bonds were incorporated to the World Government Bond Index (WGBI): this made Mexico the first Latin American country to form part of the index. With this, Mexico joined a select group of 23 countries.

== Tenure as Undersecretary of Finance and Public Credit ==
On January 19, 2011 Gerardo took office as Undersecretary of Finance and Public Credit, position to which he was appointed by President Felipe Calderón Hinojosa and ratified by Congress.

His primary roles as Undersecretary of Finance were the development, coordination and implementation of Mexico´s main macroeconomic and financial policies. Among such policies were the following: the federal government´s fiscal, exchange rate, financial and economic policy; the development of optimal strategies for the issuances of public debt; the design and execution of the development banking policies; the monitoring and regulation of the financial system; the proper functioning and evolution of the retirement saving system; the modeling and implementation of the infrastructure investment policy; and Mexico´s relationship with international financial organizations, as well as the country’s participation in international financial forums.

He was also member of the board of several government entities, such as the Central Bank; Petróleos Mexicanos, Nacional Financiera, the National Bank of Foreign Trade, the National Bank of Public Works and Services, the National Banking Commission, the National Commission of Insurance, the National Commission of the Retirement Savings System and the Mexican Mint.

During his tenure as Undersecretary, the Mexican Government undertook successfully the following actions: the implementation of an oil price hedging mechanism to guarantee public sector revenues, the acquisition of catastrophic risk insurance to protect public infrastructure against natural disasters, and the adoption of the national financial inclusion policy, among others.

Moreover, Gerardo Rodríguez had a prominent role in the design and approval process in Congress of several structural reforms, such as the new Public-Private Partnership Law for infrastructure projects, the reform to the Antitrust Law in 2011 and the reform to the INFONAVIT Law in 2011.

He was responsible of the finance track at the Deputies level during the Mexican Presidency of the G20 in 2012. Under his guidance, the Mexican economic and financial agenda was designed and promoted; emphasis was placed on developing policies to boost job creation and reinvigorate the economy, strengthening the international financial architecture, enhancing financial regulations, fostering financial inclusion and education, and promoting green policies. Among the outcomes of the G20 in 2012 are the commitment to increase the resources available for the IMF for crisis prevention and resolution for 450 billion dollars, and the adoption of Los Cabos Growth and Jobs Action Plan.

== Articles and Media Appearances ==
He has written several Op-Ed articles in local and international journals in varied topics such as Emerging Markets, Fed policy and emerging economies, the BRICS, State Development Banks, Mobile Financial Services, Sovereign Wealth Funds, Green Growth and Financial Inclusion. He also coordinated the publication of a recent book on The History of Public Debt Management in Mexico.

He was nominated by Expansion Magazine as one of the “30 promises in their 30s”, in its 2011 edition, recognizing him for being an expert manager of macroeconomic and financial variables in Mexico. Furthermore, Quien Magazine distinguished Gerardo Rodriguez as one of the 50 most influential people in Mexico in 2012 for his leadership during Mexico’s G20 presidency.

Gerardo is also a regular TV commentator in topics like Oil Prices and emerging economies, Emerging Markets opportunities, Prospects for the Mexican economy, Outlook for the Mexican economy, Emerging Market Local Rates and the Debt Restructuring of Argentina.
