= José Antonio González Anaya =

Mexican economist

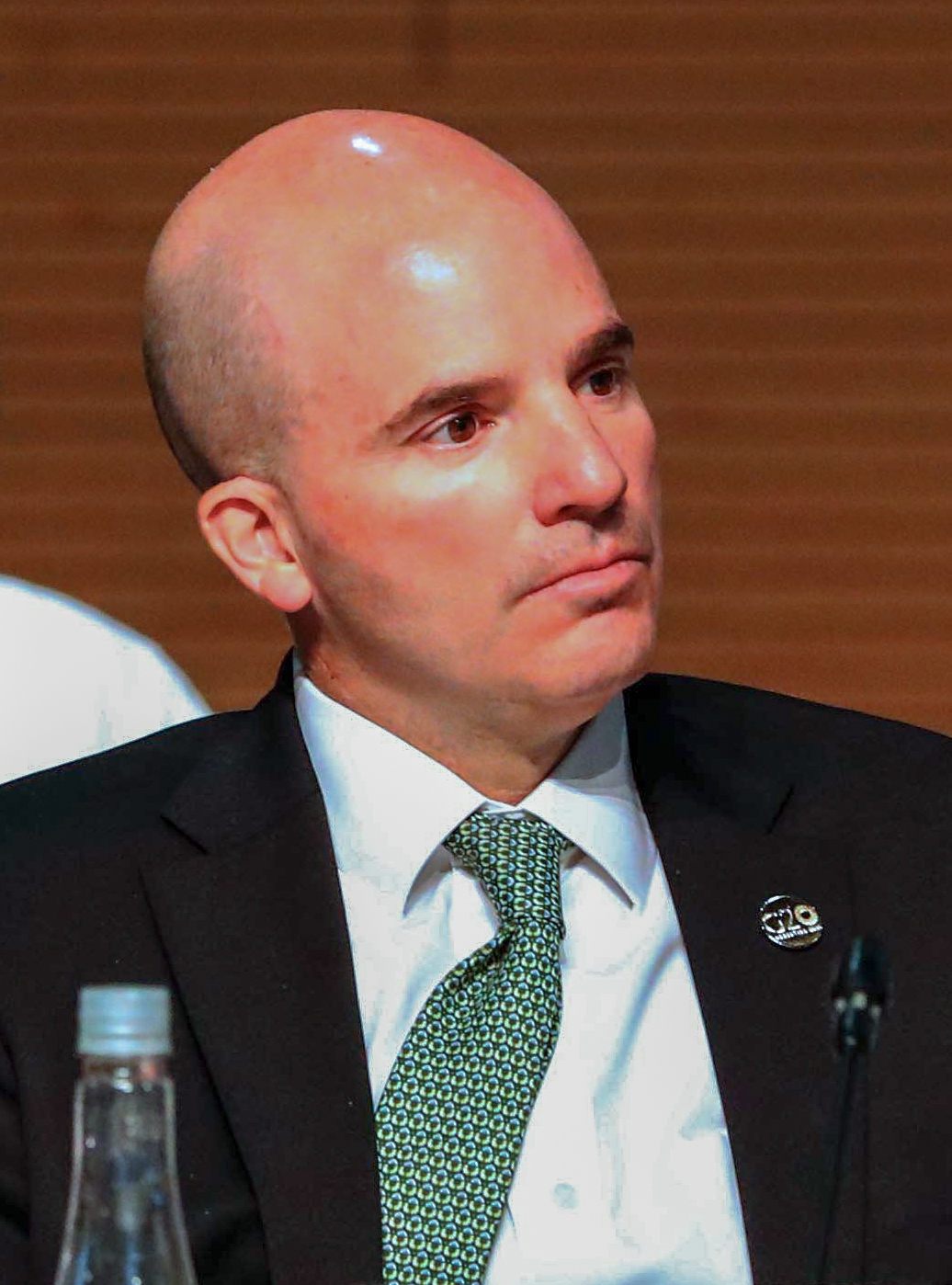

Secretary of Finance and Public Credit
- In office 27 November 2017 – 30 November 2018
- President: Enrique Peña Nieto
- Preceded by: José Antonio Meade Kuribreña
- Succeeded by: Carlos Manuel Urzúa Macías

Personal details
- Born: José Antonio González Anaya; 7 June 1967 (age 59) Mexico
- Party: No party affiliation
- Education: Massachusetts Institute of Technology (BA, BS); Harvard University (MA, PhD)

José Antonio González Anaya (born 7 June 1967) is a Mexican economist who was the minister of finance and public credit of Mexico until November 30, 2018. Previously he was CEO of PEMEX (Petroleos Mexicanos, Mexico's National Oil Company) and general director at the Mexican Social Security Institute (Instituto Mexicano del Seguro Social, IMSS). Also at the Ministry of Finance in Mexico he was: Undersecretary of Revenue; Chief of Staff of the Minister and head of the Unit of Coordination with States; head of the Unit of Pensions, Insurance and Securities; and chief of staff of the undersecretary. He was a lecturer and senior researcher at Stanford University; senior economist for Bolivia, Paraguay, and Peru at the World Bank.

He holds a PhD in economics from Harvard and a B.A. degree in economics as well as a B.S. degree in mechanical engineering from MIT.

== Family and education ==
Native of the city of Coatzacoalcos (state of Veracruz, Mexico), Gonzalez Anaya was born on 7 June 1967.

He attended MIT, where he graduated with a B.S. in economics (1989) and a B.S. in mechanical engineering (1990). He holds a PhD in economics from Harvard University (1996).

== Career ==
=== Ministry of Finance and Public Credit ===
On November 27, 2017, he was appointed by President Peña Nieto as Minister of Finance and Public Credit for the last year of his administration. He was in charge of the economic transition. Ratings agencies stabilized Mexico's outlook. He served in this position until November 30, 2018.

=== PEMEX (Petroleos Mexicanos) ===
Gonzalez Anaya was appointed CEO of PEMEX in 2016 when the eighth largest oil producer in the world was in financial crisis. Designed and implemented the first business plan based on profitability. Reached the company's financial and oil production targets. Reduced the company's credit spread from around 290 to 100 basis points. The first deep-water farm-out contract in Mexico's history (Trion field), first two on-shore farm-outs, and the first oil hedging program for the company.

=== Mexican Social Security Institute (IMSS) ===
In 2012 President Enrique Peña Nieto appointed him general director of the Mexican Social Security Institute (IMSS). In the three years he was general director, he returned the institute to profitability. His initiatives included: drug distribution optimization, consolidated drug purchases for entire public sector, the greatest formal job creation in Mexican history, the first public-private partnerships in hospitals. During his tenure high impact processes were digitalized: online payroll tax collection, digital prescription, prescription vouchers, in total 25 million face-to-face processes avoided a year. Healthcare quality initiatives included: Renewable Prescription, Heart Attack Code, Walk-In Patients, and Bed Management.

=== Ministry of Finance and Public Credit ===
==== Undersecretary of Revenue ====
Budget negotiations with Congress. Tax simplification program (elimination of over 250 rights fees). Deduction for hiring first-time workers. Tax-deductible tuition. Elimination of paper invoice when using a bank card.

==== Chief of Staff of the Minister and Head of the Unit of Coordination with States ====
Pensions reform of ISSSTE and IMSS (savings of 28% GDP). Liquidation of the state-owned electricity company Luz y Fuerza del Centro (savings of 5% GDP). Federalist Pilar of the Fiscal Reform.

==== Head of the Unit of Pensions, Insurance and Securities ====
Regulation of non-bank financial intermediation: insurance, pension funds, non-bank-banks, and stock and bond markets. New stock market law, the international stock listings system. Deregulation, modernization, and proposal of new instruments for non-banking financial intermediaries. Creation of mortgage and financial insurance.

=== Stanford University ===
Head of the Latin America program at the Center for Development Research (directed by Anne Krueger).

=== World Bank ===
Macroeconomic monitoring, insuring fiscal sustainability, and a consistent overall strategy. Highly Indebted Poor Countries Initiative (HIPC), debt relief recommendations and public expenditure review for Bolivia.

=== Mexican President's Staff ===
Gonzalez Anaya started his career in public service in 1991 when he was appointed director of economic analysis for the Economic Cabinet in the Mexican President's Staff. Writing the minutes of the Economic Cabinet Meetings. Deregulation of auto transport, Daylight savings.

== Other activities ==
- Central American Bank for Economic Integration (CABEI), ex officio member of the board of governors (since 2017)
- Inter-American Investment Corporation (IIC), ex officio member of the board of governors (since 2017)
- International Monetary Fund (IMF), ex officio member of the board of governors (since 2017)
- Multilateral Investment Guarantee Agency (MIGA), World Bank Group, ex officio member of the board of governors (since 2017)
- World Bank, ex officio member of the board of governors (since 2017)

Political offices
Preceded by José Antonio Meade Kuribreña	Secretary of Finance and Public Credit; 2017–2018	Succeeded by Carlos Manuel Urzúa Macías
