= Hugo B. Margáin =

Mexican politician

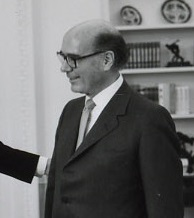
- 1982

Secretary of Finance and Public Credit
- In office 13 August 1970 – 29 May 1973
- President: Gustavo Díaz Ordaz; Luis Echeverría
- Preceded by: Antonio Ortiz Mena
- Succeeded by: José López Portillo

Personal details
- Born: 13 February 1913 Mexico City
- Died: 11 September 1997 (aged 84) Mexico
- Party: Institutional Revolutionary Party (PRI)
- Spouse: Margarita Charles
- Relations: Manuel Sandoval Vallarta (brother-in-law)
- Parent(s): César R. Margáin and María Teresa Gleason
- Education: National Autonomous University of Mexico (UNAM)
- Profession: Diplomat and economist

Hugo B. Margáin Gleason (13 February 1913 – 11 September 1997) was a Mexican economist, politician and diplomat who served as Secretary of Finance in the cabinet of Luis Echeverría (1970–73), as ambassador of Mexico to the United States (1964–70 and 1976–82), as ambassador of Mexico to the United Kingdom (1973–76) and as senator representing the Institutional Revolutionary Party (PRI, 1982–88).
