= Antonio Carrillo Flores =

Mexican politician

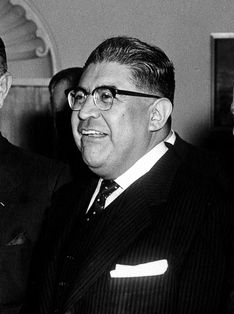

Secretary of Foreign Affairs
- In office 1 December 1964 – 30 November 1970
- President: Gustavo Díaz Ordaz
- Preceded by: José Gorostiza
- Succeeded by: Emilio Óscar Rabasa

Secretary of Finance and Public Credit
- In office 1 December 1952 – 30 November 1958
- President: Adolfo Ruiz Cortines
- Preceded by: Ramón Beteta Quintana
- Succeeded by: Antonio Ortiz Mena

Personal details
- Born: 23 June 1909
- Died: 20 March 1986 (aged 76)
- Party: Institutional Revolutionary Party
- Education: National Autonomous University of Mexico
- Profession: Lawyer, Economist

Antonio Carrillo Flores (June 23, 1909 – March 20, 1986) was a Mexican statesman, born in Mexico City. He was the second son of composer Julián Carrillo Trujillo, and older brother of Nabor Carrillo, rector of the National University and a distinguished scientist.

== Biography ==
He received his bachelor's degree in 1929 and doctor's degree in 1950 in law from the National Autonomous University of Mexico (UNAM). He formed an early friendship at UNAM with Miguel Alemán Valdés. His activities covered the fields of teaching, law enforcement, public finance and diplomacy.

He is well known for being one of the founding judges (magistrados) of the Federal Fiscal Court in 1937, (Tribunal Fiscal de la Federación) and for being Secretary of Finance (1952-1958), ambassador to both the United States and the Soviet Union, and Secretary of Foreign Affairs (1964-1970).

Carrillo Flores participated in the constitutional amendments during Mexico's nationalization of petroleum in 1938.

He was honored by more than 23 foreign governments, and he was named Doctor Honoris Causa by Lincoln College, Southern Methodist University and Harvard University. He became a member of Mexico's National College, a prestigious honorary academy.
