= Antonio Ortiz Mena =

Mexican politician

President of the Inter-American Development Bank
- In office 1971–1988
- Preceded by: Felipe Herrera
- Succeeded by: Enrique V. Iglesias

Secretary of Finance and Public Credit
- In office 1 December 1958 – 13 August 1970
- President: Adolfo López Mateos and Gustavo Díaz Ordaz
- Preceded by: Antonio Carrillo Flores
- Succeeded by: Hugo B. Margáin

Personal details
- Born: 16 April 1907 (Note: Roderic Ai Camp places his date of birth incorrectly as 22 September 1908, contradicting most obituaries published at the time of Ortiz's death. See Camp, 1995.) Parral, Chihuahua, Mexico
- Died: 12 March 2007 (aged 99) Mexico City, Mexico
- Party: Institutional Revolutionary Party (PRI)
- Spouse: Martha Salinas
- Education: National Autonomous University of Mexico (UNAM)

Antonio Ortiz Mena (16 April 1907 – 12 March 2007) was a Mexican economist who served as President of the Inter-American Development Bank (1971–1988) and as Mexico's Secretary of Finance during the administrations of Adolfo López Mateos and Gustavo Díaz Ordaz (1958–1970).

According to Pedro Aspe — who served as Secretary of Finance almost two decades later — during Ortiz's tenure Mexico's per-capita income grew 3.4 percent annually for twelve years and economic growth averaged six percent a year; inflation often remained below three percent, and millions entered the middle class as the country began its transformation from a largely rural economy to an industrial one.

== Biography ==
Ortiz Mena was born in Parral, Chihuahua, and overtook his basic studies at the Colegio Alemán, Colegio Franco-Inglés, and at the National Preparatory School of the Mexican capital. He later entered the National Autonomous University of Mexico (UNAM, 1925–1928) and graduated with a bachelor's degree in Law.

Both his parents were from old families of the northern states of Sonora and Chihuahua. Both families have had active members in Mexican political life, landownership, and mining exploitation and commerce from the time of the Spanish colony through the revolution that convulsed the country from 1910 to 1930.

From 1932 to 1936 he held minor posts at the now-defunct Department of the Federal District, and later on he gained some experience in banking while working as an assistant to the director of the National Urban Mortgage Bank (1936–1945) and as deputy director of the National Mortgage Bank (1946–1952). President Adolfo Ruiz Cortines appointed him director-general of the Mexican Institute of Social Security (IMSS) serving from 1952 to 1958.

=== Secretariat of Finance ===
From 1958 to 1970 he served as Secretary of Finance and Public Credit for a twelve-year period of sustained economic growth and development under presidents Adolfo López Mateos and Gustavo Díaz Ordaz. At least in two occasions, in 1963 and 1969, he was considered a strong contender to the presidency representing the then-hegemonic Institutional Revolutionary Party (PRI), and even former President Miguel Alemán was among his supporters. Nevertheless, in both episodes he lost the nomination.

=== Inter-American Development Bank ===
He finally stepped down from the post in August 1970, just months before the inauguration of President Luis Echeverría. His resignation took many by surprise, but a few months later the governments of Mexico and the United States announced they were supporting his bid to become the next president of the Inter-American Development Bank, replacing Chilean Felipe Herrera, its founding chairman. Both Argentina and Venezuela nominated different candidates, but on 27 November 1970 Ortiz received the majority of votes, although the U.S. Secretary of Treasury, David M. Kennedy, reported to Richard Nixon that the election had been "contentious". (Note: Washington National Records Center, Department of the Treasury, Secretary's Memos/Correspondence: FRC 56 74 A 7, Memo to the President—September–December 1970. See also the Memorandum From the Under Secretary of the Treasury (Walker) to President Nixon.)

He remained as president of the IADB for seventeen years until his resignation in 1988 — three years before the end of his last term — amid suspicions that U.S. President Ronald Reagan was trying to intervene in its internal affairs since his Secretary of State, George P. Shultz, had tried to block a 58 million USD loan to Sandinista Nicaragua. According to Elisabeth Malkin of The New York Times, during his tenure lending increased tenfold and he concentrated most of its efforts on supporting Latin American infrastructure projects, heavy industries and first financing operations for microenterprise.

Back in Mexico he served as director of Banamex, one of the country's top commercial banks that had been recently nationalized. He died in Mexico City on 12 March 2007 at the age of 99, after spending two weeks in a hospital recovering from a fall.

== Notes ==
Preceded by Felipe Herrera	President of the Inter-American Development Bank; 1971–1988	Succeeded by Enrique V. Iglesias
