= Carlos Urzúa =

Mexican politician (1955–2024)

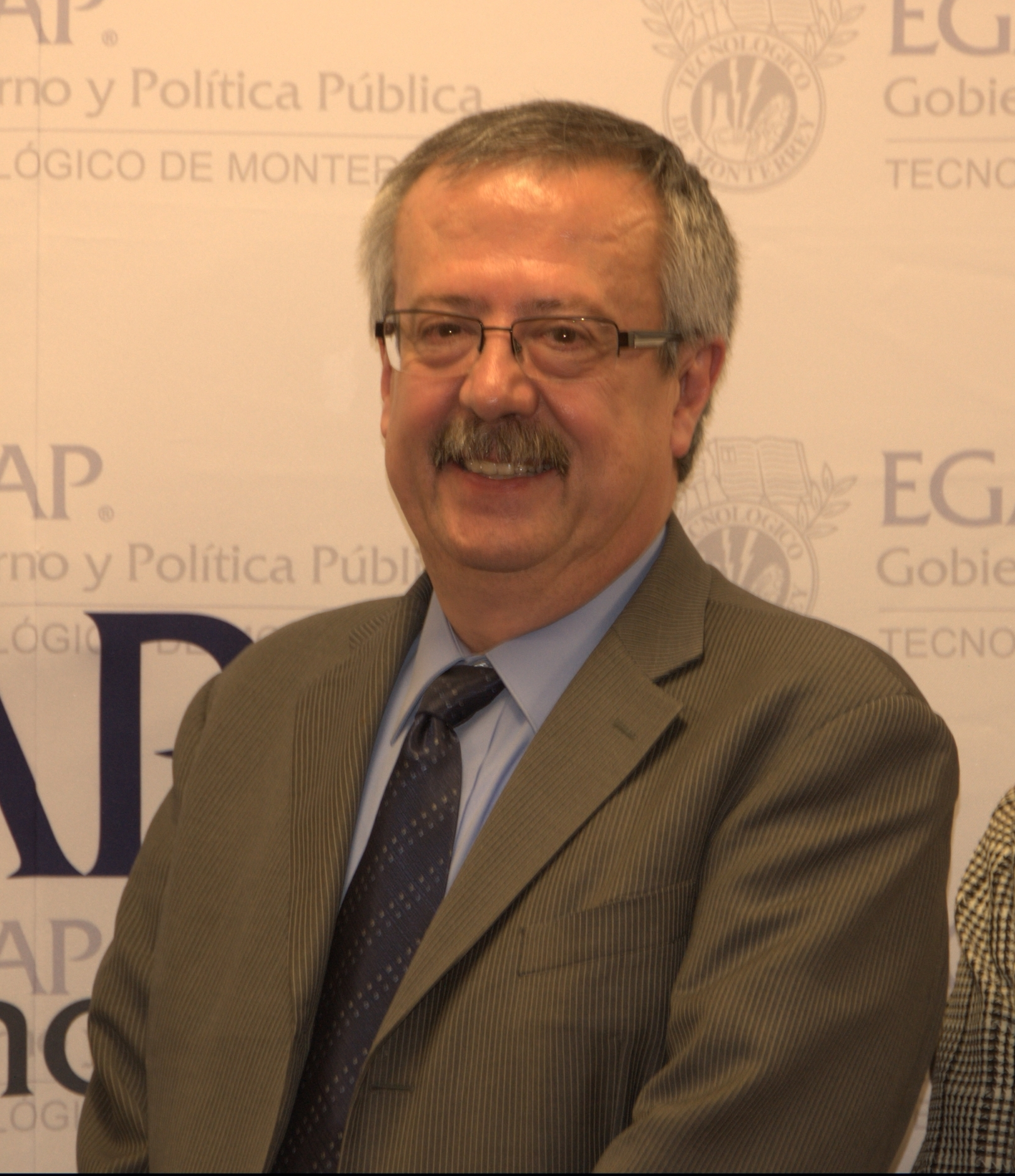
- Urzúa in 2012

Secretary of Finance and Public Credit
- In office 1 December 2018 – 9 July 2019
- President: Andrés Manuel López Obrador
- Preceded by: José Antonio González Anaya
- Succeeded by: Arturo Herrera Gutiérrez

Personal details
- Born: Carlos Manuel Urzúa Macías; 9 June 1955 Aguascalientes, Aguascalientes, Mexico
- Died: 19 February 2024 (aged 68) San Jerónimo Lídice, Mexico City, Mexico
- Education: Monterrey Institute of Technology and Higher Education (BA); National Polytechnic Institute (MA); University of Wisconsin, Madison (PhD)

Carlos Manuel Urzúa Macías (9 June 1955 – 19 February 2024) was a Mexican politician and academic who was Professor of Economics at the Tecnológico de Monterrey, Mexico City and Santa Fe campuses. He was a National Researcher and a member of the Mexican Academy of Science. Urzúa Macías served as the Secretary of Finance for the Mexico City government from 2000 to 2003. He was also an award-winning poet.

In 2018 President Andrés Manuel López Obrador appointed Urzúa Secretariat of Finance and Public Credit. But less than a year into the job Urzúa quit, citing strong differences with the President's policies.

== Life and career ==
Urzúa Macías earned a bachelor's degree from the Tecnológico de Monterrey in 1975, and a master's degree from Cinvestav in 1978, both in Mathematics. He earned a Ph D in Economics from the University of Wisconsin-Madison in 1986. Urzúa began his teaching career at the Tecnológico de Monterrey, State of Mexico campus, at the age of 22. He was an assistant professor in the Economics Department at Georgetown University (1986–1988), and a visiting assistant professor in the Woodrow Wilson School at Princeton University (1988–1990). He was a professor in the Economics Department at the Colegio de México from 1989 to 2000.

From 2000 to 2003, he was appointed Secretary of Finance for the Mexico City government under then mayor Andrés Manuel López Obrador. In 2003, Urzúa left government to found the Escuela de Graduados en Administración Pública y Política Pública, a public policy graduate school at the Tecnológico de Monterrey, Mexico City campus, which he directed for ten years.

Aside from his more theoretical work, Urzúa wrote extensively on many aspects of the Mexican economy: fiscal policy, monetary policy, tax reform, poverty, economic competition, international trade, fiscal federalism, and economic history. He worked over the years as a consultant to the World Bank, the United Nations Economic Commission for Latin America and the Caribbean, the United Nations Development Programme and the Organisation for Economic Co-operation and Development. He also advised Mexican firms on international trade issues.

Urzúa Macías died on 19 February 2024, at the age of 68.

== Publications ==
=== Books ===
- C. M. Urzúa (1991), El déficit del sector público y la política fiscal en México, 1980-1989, Santiago de Chile: Naciones Unidas.
- C. M. Urzúa (2000), Medio siglo de relaciones entre el Banco Mundial y México: Una reseña desde el trópico, Mexico City: El Colegio de México.
- C. M. Urzúa (2002), Recuerdan los muertos, Mexico City: Tintanueva.
- C. M. Urzúa (2002), Ejercicios de teoría microeconómica, Mexico City: El Colegio de México.
- C. M. Urzúa (2006), Política social para la equidad, co-editor with L. F. López-Calva and E. Ortiz, Mexico City: Porrúa.
- C. M. Urzúa (2009), Pobreza en México: Magnitud y perfiles, co-editor with R. Aparicio and V. Villarespe, Mexico City: Grupo Edición-CONEVAL-UNAM-ITESM.
- C. M. Urzúa (2011), Sistemas de impuestos y prestaciones en América Latina, co-editor with L. F. López-Calva, Puebla: BUAP-IDRC-ITESM-PNUD.
- C. M. Urzúa (2012), Fiscal inclusive development: Microsimulation models for Latin America, editor, Mexico City: IDRC-ITESM-PNUD.
- C. M. Urzúa (2012), Construyendo el futuro de México: Propuestas de políticas públicas, co-editor with T. Almaguer and H. Moreira, Monterrey: ITESM.
- C. M. Urzúa (2014), Criaturas vistas o soñadas: Adivinanzas, Mexico City: Magenta Ediciones.

=== Academic Articles and Chapters ===
- Google Scholar profile
- "Most widely held works by Carlos M Urzúa". WorldCat.

Political offices
Preceded by José Antonio González Anaya	Secretary of Finance and Public Credit; 2018–2019	Succeeded by Arturo Herrera Gutiérrez
