= Jesús Silva-Herzog Flores =

Mexican politician

Secretary of Finance and Public Credit
- In office 16 March 1982 – 17 June 1986
- President: José López Portillo; Miguel de la Madrid
- Preceded by: David Ibarra Muñoz
- Succeeded by: Gustavo Petricioli

7th Secretary of Tourism
- In office 14 December 1993 – 30 November 1994
- President: Carlos Salinas de Gortari
- Preceded by: Pedro Joaquín Coldwell
- Succeeded by: Silvia Hernández Enríquez

Ambassador of Mexico to the United States
- In office 10 February 1995 – 3 November 1997
- President: Ernesto Zedillo
- Preceded by: Jorge Montaño
- Succeeded by: Jesús F. Reyes Heroles

Ambassador of Mexico to Spain
- In office 16 April 1991 – 14 January 1994
- President: Carlos Salinas de Gortari
- Preceded by: Enrique González Pedrero
- Succeeded by: Ignacio Pichardo Pagaza

Personal details
- Born: Jesús Silva y Flores; 8 May 1935 Mexico City, Mexico
- Died: 6 March 2017 (aged 81) Mexico City, Mexico
- Party: Revolutionary Institutional Party (PRI)
- Spouse: María Teresa Márquez Diez-Canedo
- Education: National Autonomous University of Mexico (UNAM), Yale University
- Profession: Politician, economist

Jesús Silva-Herzog Flores, born as Jesús Silva y Flores (8 May 1935 – 6 March 2017) was a Mexican economist and politician affiliated with the Institutional Revolutionary Party (PRI). He served as secretary of finance and public credit in the cabinet of President Miguel de la Madrid (1982–1986), as ambassador to Spain (1991–1994) and the United States (1995–1997), and as secretary of tourism (1994) in the cabinet of Carlos Salinas de Gortari.

== Biography ==
Silva Herzog was born as Jesús Silva y Flores in Mexico City to economic historian Jesús Silva Herzog and Josefina Flores Villarreal. He received a bachelor's degree in economics from the National Autonomous University of Mexico (UNAM, 1959) and a master's degree in the same discipline from Yale University (1962).

He taught several courses in economics at UNAM (1963–1969) and El Colegio de México (1964–1969); worked as an economist for the Inter-American Development Bank (1962–1963) and as director-general of the National Institute of Housing (INFONAVIT, 1972–1976) before joining the Bank of Mexico as director-general (1977–1978) and serving as undersecretary of finance in the cabinet of José López Portillo (1979–1982).

In 2000, he lost Mexico City's Head of Government election to Andrés Manuel López Obrador.

Silva Herzog died on 6 March 2017 at the age of 81.

== Personal life ==
He was married to María Teresa Márquez Diez-Canedo and is the father of three children: María Teresa, Eugenia and Jesús Silva Herzog Márquez.

== See also ==
- Latin American debt crisis
