= Georgina Kessel =

Mexican politician

Georgina Kessel Martínez is a Mexican economist for the Spanish energy firm Iberdrola. She is a former head of the Casa de Moneda de México (the Mexican mint) and the Secretary of Energy in the cabinet of President Felipe Calderón.

She was head of the Banco Nacional de Obras y Servicios Públicos (Banobras).

== Personal life and education ==
Kessel attended the Instituto Tecnológico Autónomo de México (ITAM) from 1975 to 1979 and graduated with a bachelor's degree in economics. A few years later she received a doctorate in the same discipline from Columbia University in the United States. Kessel worked for over nine years as a full-time professor at the ITAM, where she headed the Department of Economics in 1994. Amongst her former students is Felipe Calderón, who earned a master's degree in economics under Kessel at ITAM. Calderón subsequently appointed her Minister of Energy after he was elected President of Mexico in 2006.

== Public and political career ==
In the public sector Kessel has worked at the Energy Regulatory Commission, the Mexican mint (Casa de Moneda de México), Pemex and the Secretariat of Finance.

In 2005 she received the Premio al mérito profesional in the public sector, a recognition of the ITAM alumni.

She was appointed member of the Board of Directors of Iberdrola on 23 April 2013.

== Published works ==
- El sur también existe (with Santiago Levy and Enrique Dávila)
- Los peligros del Plan Puebla-Panamá
- Lo negociado del Tratado de Libre Comercio (compiler)
- Eduardo Andere; Georgina Kessel (1992). México y el Tratado Trilateral de Libre Comercio: Impacto Sectorial. McGraw-Hill Interamericana de México. ISBN 978-970-10-0191-2.

Preceded by Fernando Canales Clariond	Secretary of Energy; 2006–2011	Succeeded by José Antonio Meade
