= Alfredo de Sarachaga =

Alfredo de Sarachaga was an accomplished businessman in the Petrochemical Industry. He was a Mexican diplomat, and for over 20 years was Pemex's New York financial director, de facto, CEO Pemex America.

Alfredo de Sarachaga was born a Mexican of basque descent, heir of Alexis de Sarachaga and son of Ricardo de Sarachaga and Maria Luisa Carrouche, both of Bilbao.

He married Lidia Garcia de Leon y Avellaneda. His wife was the maternal aunt of Dionisio Meade y Garcia de Leon, father of Jose Antonio Meade, all part of the prominent Mexican political family Garcia de Leon family of Mexico. The couple had several children, three of them being daughters.
