= Slim family =

Mexican family prominent in business

Slim
- Current region: Mexico
- Origin: Lebanon
- Founder: Julián Slim Haddad
- Connected members: Fernando Romero; Alfredo Harp Helú
- Connected families: García de León family

The Slim family is a Mexican family of Lebanese descent whose members reside in Europe, Lebanon, the United States and Mexico. The family is currently one of the wealthiest in the world.

== Notable members ==
- Carlos Slim Helú (born 1940), a business magnate, was the wealthiest person in the world for several years.
  - Carlos Slim Domit (born 1967), business magnate.
