= José Antonio Meade =

Mexican politician and career public servant

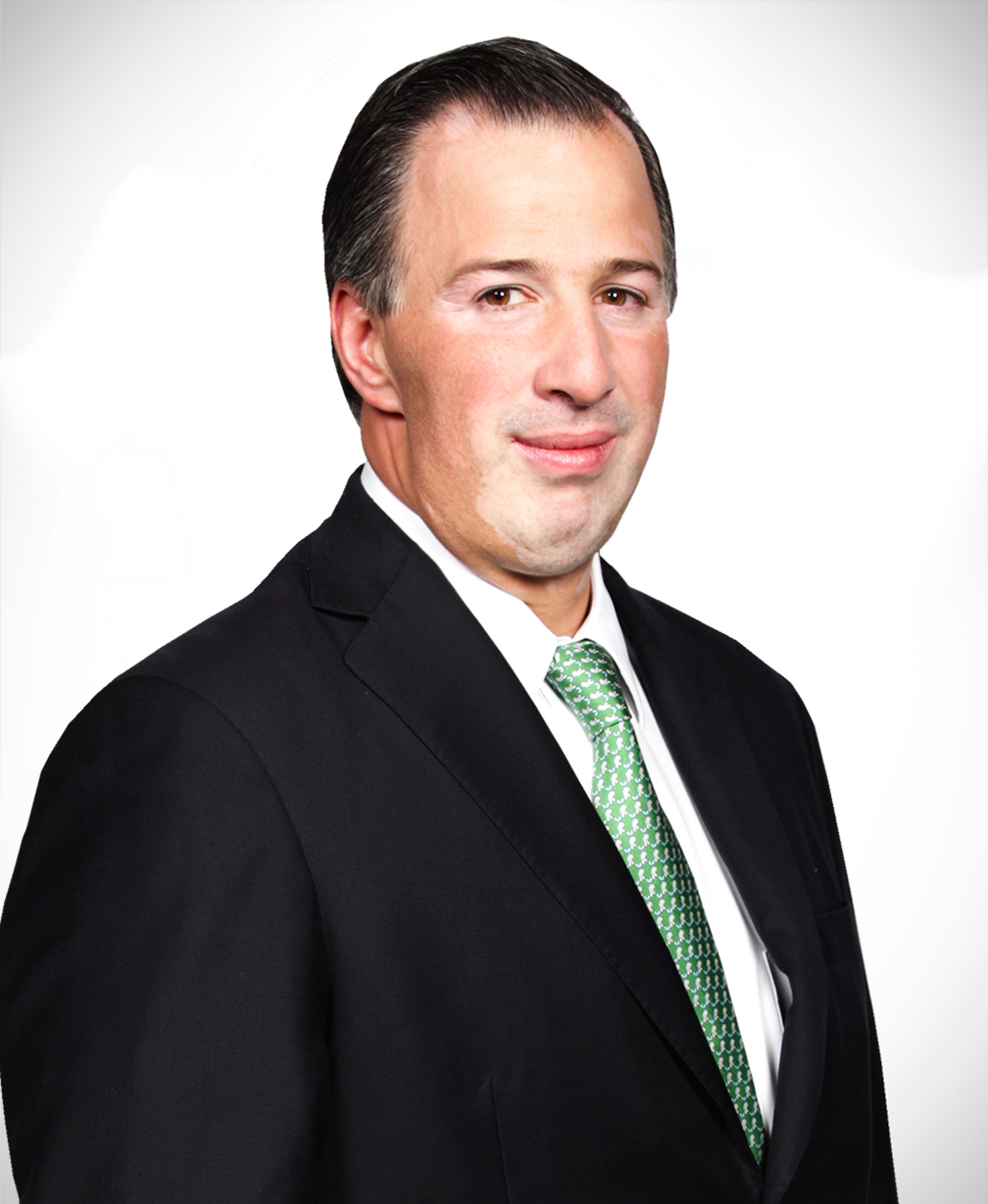
- Official portrait, 2014

Secretary of Finance and Public Credit of Mexico
- In office 7 September 2016 – 27 November 2017
- President: Enrique Peña Nieto
- Preceded by: Luis Videgaray Caso
- Succeeded by: José Antonio González Anaya
- In office 9 September 2011 – 30 November 2012
- President: Felipe Calderón
- Preceded by: Ernesto Cordero Arroyo
- Succeeded by: Luis Videgaray Caso

Secretary of Social Development of Mexico
- In office 27 August 2015 – 6 September 2016
- President: Enrique Peña Nieto
- Preceded by: Rosario Robles
- Succeeded by: Luis Enrique Miranda Nava

Secretary of Foreign Affairs of Mexico
- In office 1 December 2012 – 26 August 2015
- President: Enrique Peña Nieto
- Preceded by: Patricia Espinosa
- Succeeded by: Claudia Ruiz Massieu

Secretary of Energy of Mexico
- In office 7 January 2011 – 9 September 2011
- President: Felipe Calderón
- Preceded by: Georgina Kessel
- Succeeded by: Jordy Herrera Flores

Deputy Secretary of Finance and Public Credit of Mexico
- In office 20 August 2010 – 6 January 2011
- President: Felipe Calderón
- Preceded by: Alejandro Werner Wainfeld
- Succeeded by: Gerardo Rodriguez Regordosa

Personal details
- Born: José Antonio Meade Kuribreña; 27 February 1969 (age 57) Mexico City, Mexico
- Party: Independent
- Other political affiliations: Institutional Revolutionary Party
- Spouse: Juana Cuevas (m. 1994)
- Education: Mexico Autonomous Institute of Technology (BA); National Autonomous University of Mexico (LLB); Yale University (PhD)

José Antonio Meade Kuribreña (Spanish pronunciation: [xoˌse anˈtonjo ˈmið kuɾiˈβɾeɲa]; born 27 February 1969) is a Mexican politician, economist, lawyer, and diplomat. He served as a cabinet minister under Presidents Felipe Calderón and Enrique Peña Nieto in a variety of portfolios, becoming the first Mexican official appointed to cabinet five times. He was the Institutional Revolutionary Party (PRI) candidate in the 2018 presidential election, where he placed third.

== Biography ==
Meade is the son of Dionisio Meade and his wife Lucía, daughter of the lawyer and sculptor José Kuribreña. The Meade Kuribreña family is a Mexican family of Irish and Lebanese descent. He is married to painter Juana Cuevas and they have 3 children.

=== Education ===
Meade has a B.S. in Economics from Instituto Tecnológico Autónomo de México (ITAM), a B.S. in Law from Universidad Nacional Autónoma de México (UNAM) and a Ph.D. in Economics from Yale University.

== Career ==
From 1997 to 1999, Meade was the General Director of Financial Planning at the National Commission for the Retirement Savings System. In 1999, he was named Deputy Secretary of Bank Savings Protection at Mexico's Institute for the Protection of Bank Savings. The following year, he became General Director of Banking and Savings at the Ministry of Finance and Public Credit. As Chief Executive Officer of the National Bank for Rural Credit (2002 to 2003), he led the financial restructuring and transition to the new institution that would substitute Banrural: Financiera Rural, where he would serve as Chief Executive Office until 2006.

=== Felipe Calderón's Administration ===
During President Felipe Calderón's administration, Meade served as Chief of Staff to the Secretary of Finance and Public Credit, Undersecretary of Finance and Public Credit, and later on he became a member of the Cabinet, serving as Secretary of Energy, and Secretary of Finance and Public Credit.

==== Secretary of Energy (2011) ====
As Secretary of Energy, Meade implemented the first bidding round for Integrated Exploration and Production Contracts and new ducts that allowed natural gas to reach multiple communities for the first time. Furthermore, he brought electricity to all communities of over 100 inhabitants, promoted a more efficient use of energy and distributed around 50 million energy saving light bulbs.

==== Secretary of Finance and Public Credit (2011 - 2012) ====
Meade was nominated to be Secretary of Finance and Public Credit in 2011. During this time, he led the Ministry throughout Mexico's presidency of the G20, achieving agreements to strengthen the IMF, reduce protectionism and position financial inclusion as a priority. Moreover, he conducted a smooth transition between administrations from different parties with robust growth and stable inflation.

=== Enrique Peña Nieto's Administration ===
==== Secretary of Foreign Affairs (2012 - 2015) ====
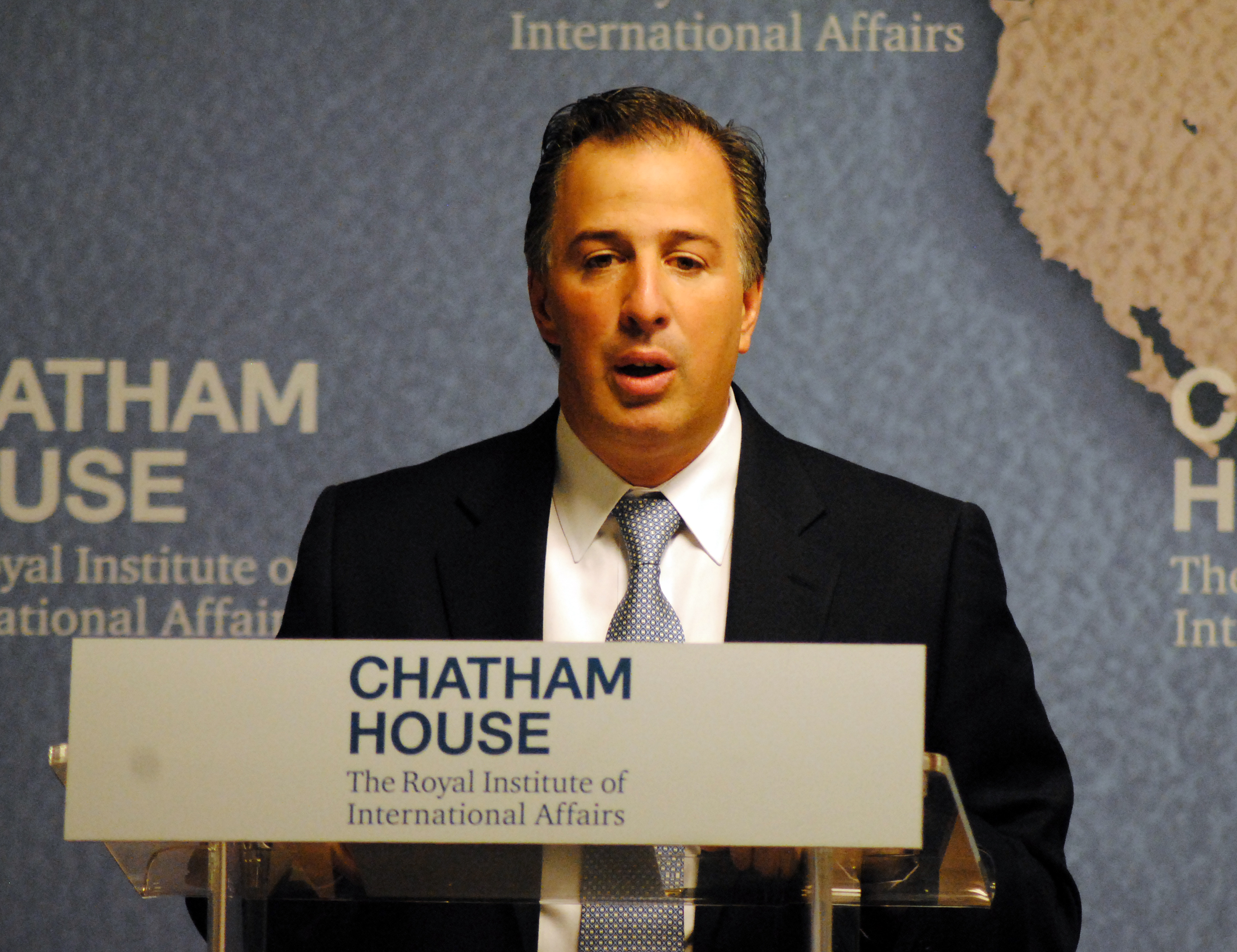
José Antonio Meade as Secretary of Foreign Affairs before the Chatham House in 2014.

The first position he held in President Enrique Peña Nieto's administration was as Secretary of Foreign Affairs, where he broadened the relation with the United States, by creating a framework beyond migration and security, which promoted research, innovation, entrepreneurship and higher education, through the US-Mexico Bilateral Forum on Higher Education, Innovation and Research, and the Mexico-US Entrepreneurship and Innovation Council. Moreover, he improved the access of undocumented migrants in the US to health and education, as well as to key documents such as driving licenses, birth certificates and identification cards. Finally, he normalized diplomatic relations with Cuba and France. In 2013, Foreign Policy named him one of the world's most powerful people.

==== Secretary of Social Development (2015 - 2016) ====
As Secretary of Social Development, Meade designed and implemented the National Inclusion Strategy to ensure access by Mexico's poorest to the social services they were legally entitled to have. During his tenure, 2 million people left the ranks of extreme poverty, through the involvement of local governments, businessmen, and civil society. In February 2016, the League of United Latin American Citizens Council No. 12 in Laredo, Texas, U.S., announced that Meade and George P. Bush, the Texas land commissioner, would both receive the titles of "Señor Internacional," a designation used since 1976 to honor distinguished figures in the border region as part of the annual Washington's Birthday Celebration.

==== Secretary of Finance and Public Credit (2016 - 2017) ====
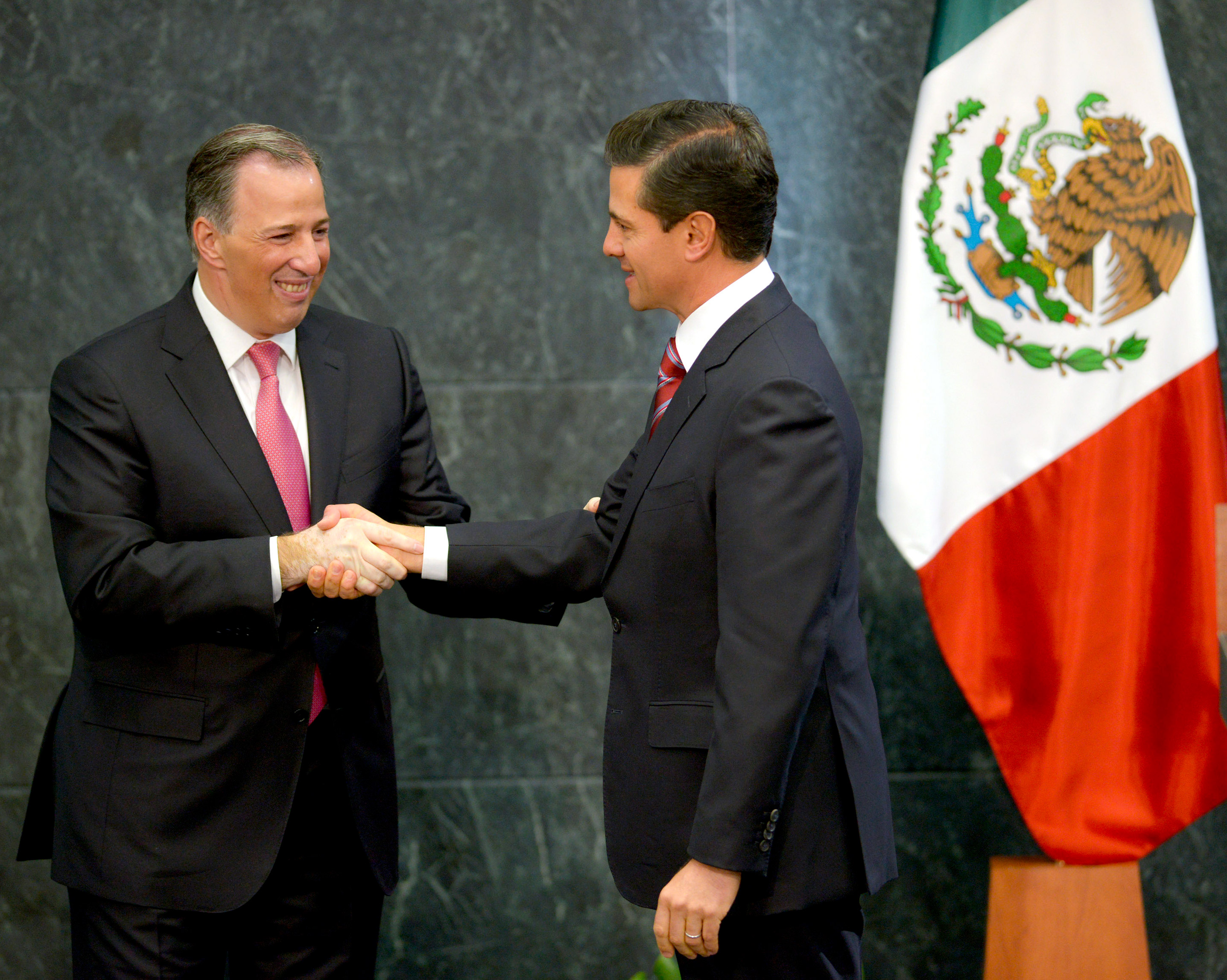
The president Enrique Peña Nieto announced the resignation of José Antonio Meade, as Secretary of Finance and Public Credit.

During his second time as Secretary of Finance and Public Credit, two of the world's top rating agencies changed their rating perspective of Mexico from negative to stable, and in 2017 Mexico's economy grew 50% more than expected. Furthermore, he achieved the first primary surplus in 9 years and reduced the debt-to-GDP ratio, for the first time in 10 years. In 2017, he was named Latin America's Finance Minister of the Year by Capital Markets magazine.

=== 2018 Presidential Campaign ===
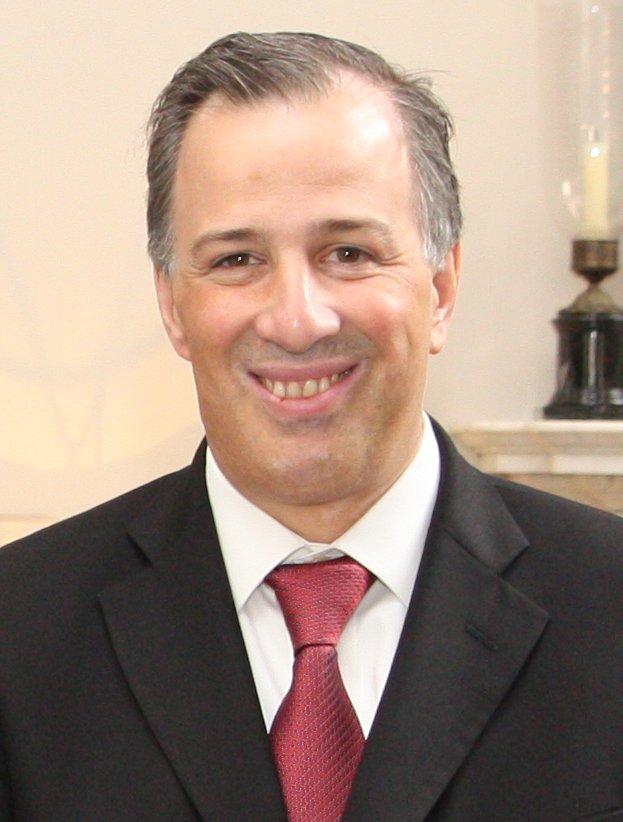
Foreign Minister José Antonio Meade at UK Foreign Office meeting, London, February 2015.

On 9 August 2017, the PRI revised its requirements for presidential candidates, eliminating the requirement that candidates must have 10 years of party membership, and allowing "illustrious" non-party figures to lead the party. This move was seen as benefitting Meade, as he is not a member of the PRI. On 27 November 2017, Meade resigned his post as Secretary of Finance and Public Credit and announced he would compete in the 2018 presidential election, representing the Institutional Revolutionary Party (PRI). Meade was seen as the safest bet for the party, as his formal non-affiliation and clean public record could distance him from the party's scandals. Meade was formally selected as the PRI's candidate at their convention of delegates on 18 February 2018.

On Election Day, shortly after the polls closed, Meade conceded defeat and wished victor Andrés Manuel López Obrador "every success".

== Other activities ==
He currently serves as non-executive Director of Grupo ALFA, Grupo Comercial Chedraui and he is the first Latin-American to be an independent non executive Director of HSBC Holdings. Furthermore, he is a board member of the Global Center on Adaptation and the Center for US-Mexico Studies at UC San Diego.

== Honors ==
- (United Kingdom) Honorary Knight Commander of the Order of St Michael and St George (2015)

Political offices
Preceded by Jordy Herrera Flores	Secretary of Energy; 2011	Succeeded by Georgina Kessel
Preceded by Ernesto Cordero Arroyo	Secretary of Finance and Public Credit; 2011–2012	Succeeded by Luis Videgaray Caso
Preceded by Patricia Espinosa	Secretary of Foreign Affairs; 2012–2015	Succeeded by Claudia Ruiz Massieu
Preceded by Rosario Robles	Secretary of Social Development; 2015–2016	Succeeded by Luis Enrique Miranda
Preceded by Luis Videgaray Caso	Secretary of Finance and Public Credit; 2016–2017	Succeeded by José Antonio González Anaya
