= Julio Rodolfo Moctezuma =

Mexican politician

Julio Rodolfo Moctezuma cid

Secretary of Finance and Public Credit
- In office 1 December 1976 – 17 November 1977
- President: José López Portillo
- Preceded by: Mario Ramón Beteta
- Succeeded by: David Ibarra

Personal details
- Born: March 24, 1927 Mexico City, Mexico
- Died: August 4, 2000 (aged 73) Mexico City, Mexico
- Party: Institutional Revolutionary Party (PRI)
- Education: UNAM
- Profession: Lawyer

Julio Rodolfo Moctezuma Cid (March 24, 1927 – August 4, 2000) was a Mexican lawyer who served as the first Secretary of Finance (1976–77) in the cabinet of President José López Portillo, as director-general of Pemex (1981–82) and as director-general of the now extinct Somex bank (1982–88).

Moctezuma was born in Mexico City into a family composed by Alberto Moctezuma —a farmer— and Alicia Cid. He graduated from the National Autonomous University of Mexico (UNAM) with a bachelor's degree Law and married Blanca Rosa Franco. He practiced law in Preinversión de México, S.A., lectured in Political Science at the National University, held several posts at the extinct Secretariat of the Presidency and worked as an adviser to the National Company for Popular Subsistence (Conasupo).

When José López Portillo —a close friend of his since the 1950s— assumed the presidency of Mexico, he served briefly as his first Secretary of Finance but was forced to resign on 17 November 1977 after several public policy disagreements with Carlos Tello Macías, the statist Secretary of Budget and Planning in the federal cabinet.

Moctezuma Cid died in Mexico City on August 4, 2000, aged 73.
