= Mario Ramón Beteta =

Mexican economist (1925–2004)

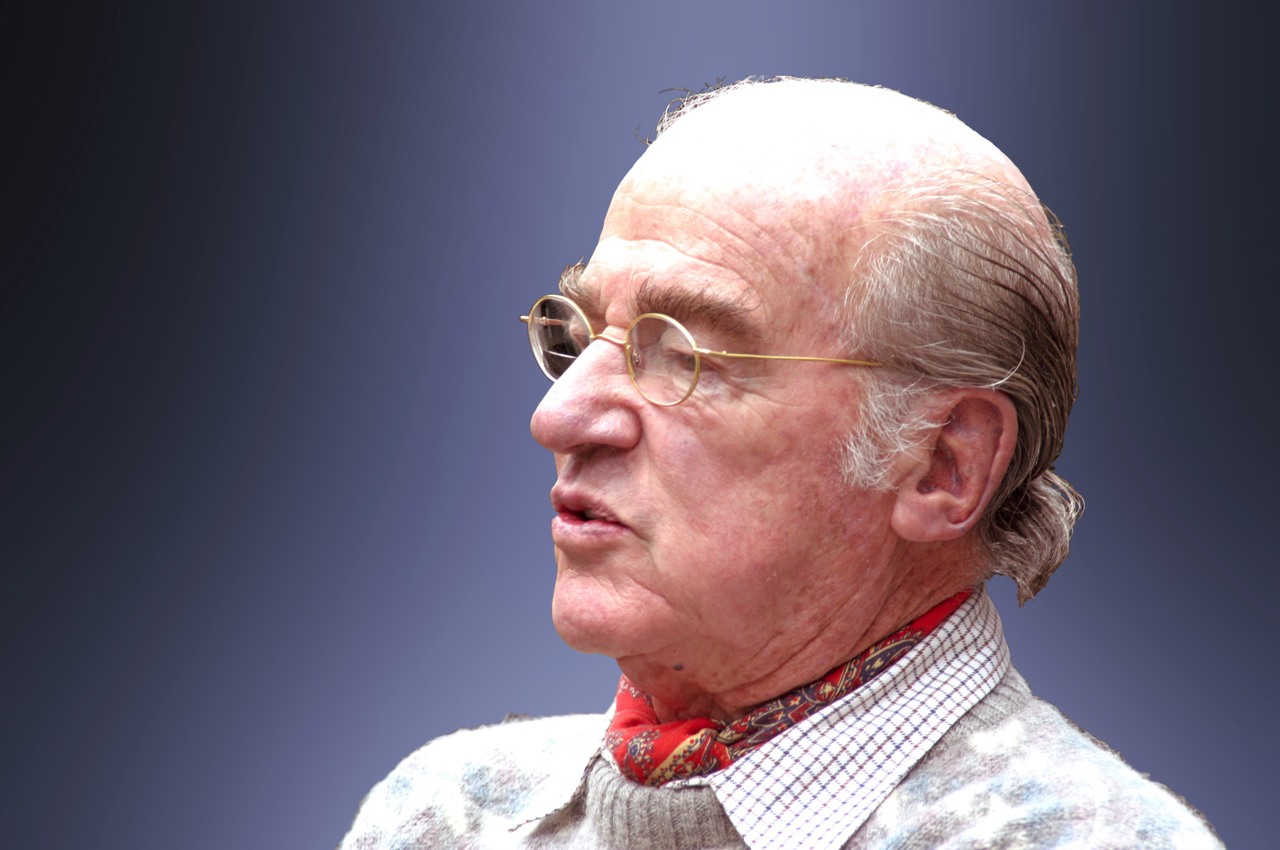

Secretary of Finance and Public Credit
- In office 22 September 1975 – 30 November 1976
- President: Luis Echeverría
- Preceded by: José López Portillo
- Succeeded by: Julio Rodolfo Moctezuma

Governor of the State of México
- In office September 1987 – September 1989
- Preceded by: Alfredo Baranda García
- Succeeded by: Ignacio Pichardo Pagaza

Personal details
- Born: 7 July 1925 Mexico City, Mexico
- Died: 5 October 2004 (aged 79) Mexico City, Mexico
- Party: Institutional Revolutionary Party (PRI)
- Education: UNAM, University of Wisconsin
- Profession: Economist, politician

Mario Ramón Beteta Monsalve (7 July 1925 – 5 October 2004) was a Mexican economist who served as the last Secretary of Finance in the cabinet of President Luis Echeverría (1975–76), as director-general of Pemex (1982–87) and as governor of the State of México (1987–89).

== Early life ==
Beteta was born in Mexico City into a family led by General Ignacio Beteta, a well-known artist and former chief of staff of President Lázaro Cárdenas and brother of Ramón Beteta, who also served as Secretary of Finance during the presidency of Miguel Alemán Valdés. He graduated from the National Autonomous University of Mexico (UNAM) with a bachelor's degree in Law (1948), completed a master's degree in economics at the University of Wisconsin (1950) and married Gloria Leal Kuri before working as a professor of Introductory Economics and Monetary Theory at the National School of Economics (UNAM, 1951–59).

He worked as director-general of Credit (1964–70) and then as Undersecretary of the Treasury (1970–75) at the Secretariat of Finance, and when the secretary, José López Portillo, resigned to run for president as candidate of the Institutional Revolutionary Party (PRI), Beteta was appointed as substitute. During his tenure, he had to deal with the 1976 peso devaluation.

After leaving the federal cabinet, Beteta served as president of the extinct Somex Group (1977–82), as director-general of Pemex (1982–87), as governor of the State of México (1987–89) and as director-general of Comermex (1989–90). He died in Mexico City on 5 October 2004, victim of a chronic lung disease.

His nephew, Óscar Mario Beteta, was a popular radio host in Mexico City.
