= Dionisio Meade y Garcia de Leon =

Mexican politician

Deputy of the Congress of the Union for the 4th Circumscription
- In office 1 September 1997 – 31 August 2000
- Constituency: Federal District

Personal details
- Born: Dionisio Alfredo Meade y García de León; February 12, 1944 (age 82) Mexico City, Mexico,
- Spouse: Lucía Kuribreña Orvanos
- Children: José Antonio Meade Kuribreña
- Parent(s): Luis Meade Gómez; Gracia García de León Avellaneda
- Education: UNAM

Dionisio Meade y García de León is a former member of the Chamber of Deputies of Mexico and current president of the UNAM Foundation (FUNAM). In 2011 he was Director of Institutional Relations for the Bank of Mexico.

== Education ==
He studied economics at the National Autonomous University of Mexico's (UNAM) School of Economics from 1961 to 1965. In addition, he obtained his law degree from UNAM, where he subsequently became a professor of economics, political science, and law.

== Family ==
Meade y García de León is the son of Luis Meade Gómez, and his wife, Gracia García de León Avellaenda. He is the nephew of Lidia García de León and Alfredo de Sarachaga. He married Lucía Kuribreña Orvanos, the daughter of Daniel Kuribreña, a founder of CEN and member of PAN. They are the parents of José Antonio Meade Kuribreña.
