= Ramón Beteta Quintana =

Mexican politician (1901–1965)

Secretary of Finance and Public Credit
- In office 1 December 1946 – 30 November 1952
- President: Miguel Alemán Valdés
- Preceded by: Eduardo Suárez Aránzolo
- Succeeded by: Antonio Carrillo Flores

Personal details
- Born: 7 October 1901 Hermosillo, Mexico
- Died: 5 October 1965 (aged 63)
- Education: National Autonomous University of Mexico
- Profession: Lawyer

Ramón Beteta Quintana (7 October 1901 – 5 October 1965) was a Mexican politician.

== Biography ==
Ramón Beteta Quintana was born on 7 October 1901, in Hermosillo (though it was registered in Mexico City). He was the son of Enrique Beteta Méndez and Sara Quintana, brother of Major General Ignacio M. Beteta, and uncle of Mario Ramón Beteta. He studied at the University of Texas at Austin between 1920 and 1923, graduating with a degree in economics. He then attended the National Autonomous University of Mexico (UNAM), obtaining a degree in law in 1926, and then becoming the first student to obtain a Ph.D. in Social Sciences at that school in 1934.

Beteta was one of the founders of the National School of Economics at the UNAM, where he taught from 1924 to 1942. He also taught at law school, taught at the National Preparatory School (1925–1928), and taught in secondary schools in Mexico City. He became a member of the League of professionals and intellectuals in the PRM in 1939. He managed the 1945 election campaign for president Miguel Alemán Valdés.

Beteta held various positions in three presidential administrations: Director-General of the Department of National Statistics of the Department of Industry and Trade from 1933 to 1935; Deputy Foreign Minister from 1936 to 1940; and Secretary of Finance and Public Credit from 1946 to 1952. Later he was the Ambassador of Mexico in Italy (1952–1955) and Greece (1955–1958). Towards the end of his life he became involved in journalism as Director-General of the Novedades and the Diario de la Tarde between 1958 and 1964.

He died of a heart attack on 5 October 1965, aged 63.
