= Arturo Herrera (politician) =

Politician

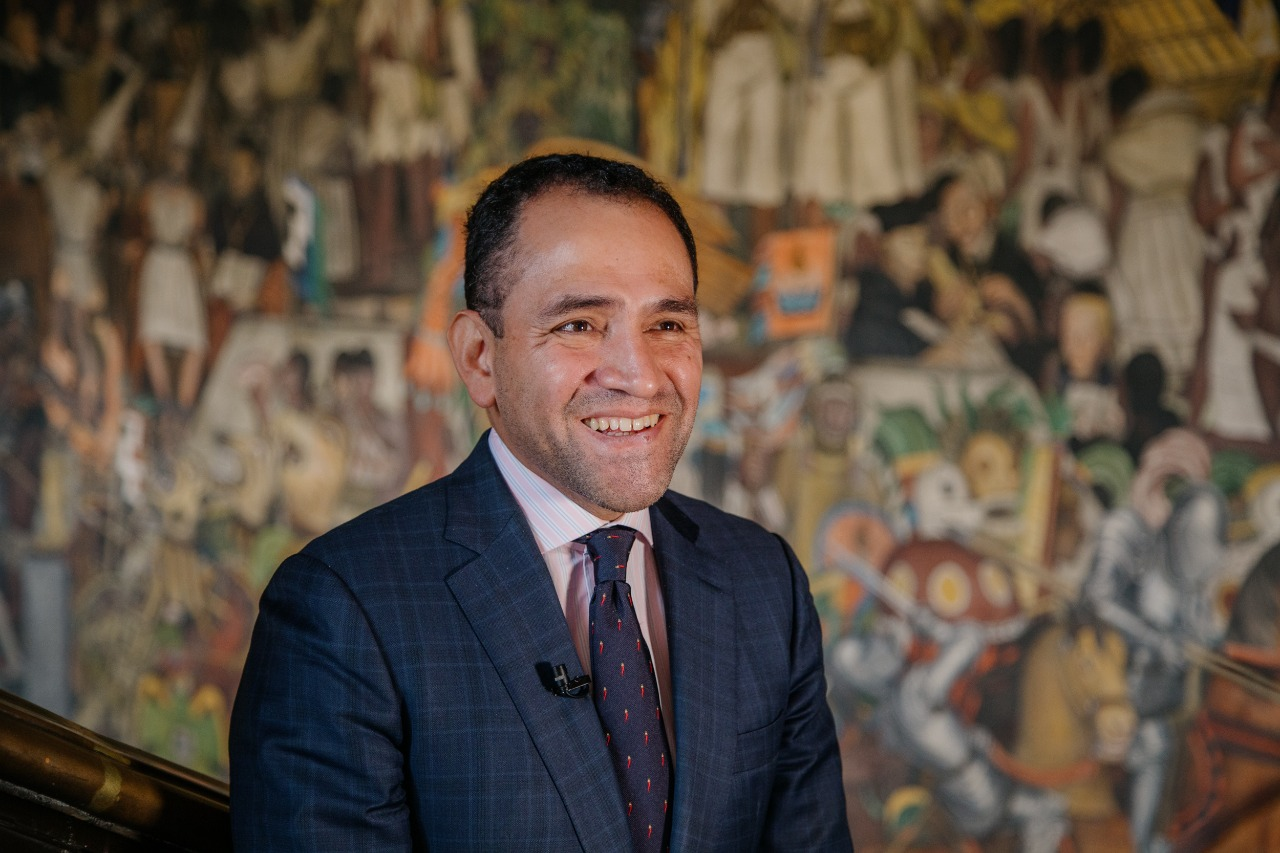

Secretary of Finance and Public Credit
- In office July 18, 2019 – July 15, 2021
- President: Andrés Manuel López Obrador
- Preceded by: Carlos Manuel Urzúa Macías
- Succeeded by: Rogelio Ramírez de la O

Assistant Secretary of the Interior
- In office December 12, 2018 – July 9, 2019

Secretary of Finances of the Federal District (DF)
- In office 2000–2006
- Appointed by: Andrés Manuel López Obrador and Alejandro Encinas Rodríguez

Personal details
- Born: Arturo Herrera Gutiérrez; March 21, 1967 (age 59) Actopan, Hidalgo, Mexico
- Parent(s): Irma Gutiérrez Mejía; Arturo Herrera Cabañas
- Education: Universidad Autónoma Metropolitana (BA); El Colegio de México (MA); New York University

Arturo Herrera Gutiérrez is a Mexican economist and former member of the Cabinet of Mexico designated as Secretary of Finance and Public Credit (SHCP) by President Andrés Manuel López Obrador (AMLO) to replace Carlos Manuel Urzúa Macías on July 9, 2019, ratified on July 18, 2019, by the Chamber of Deputies.

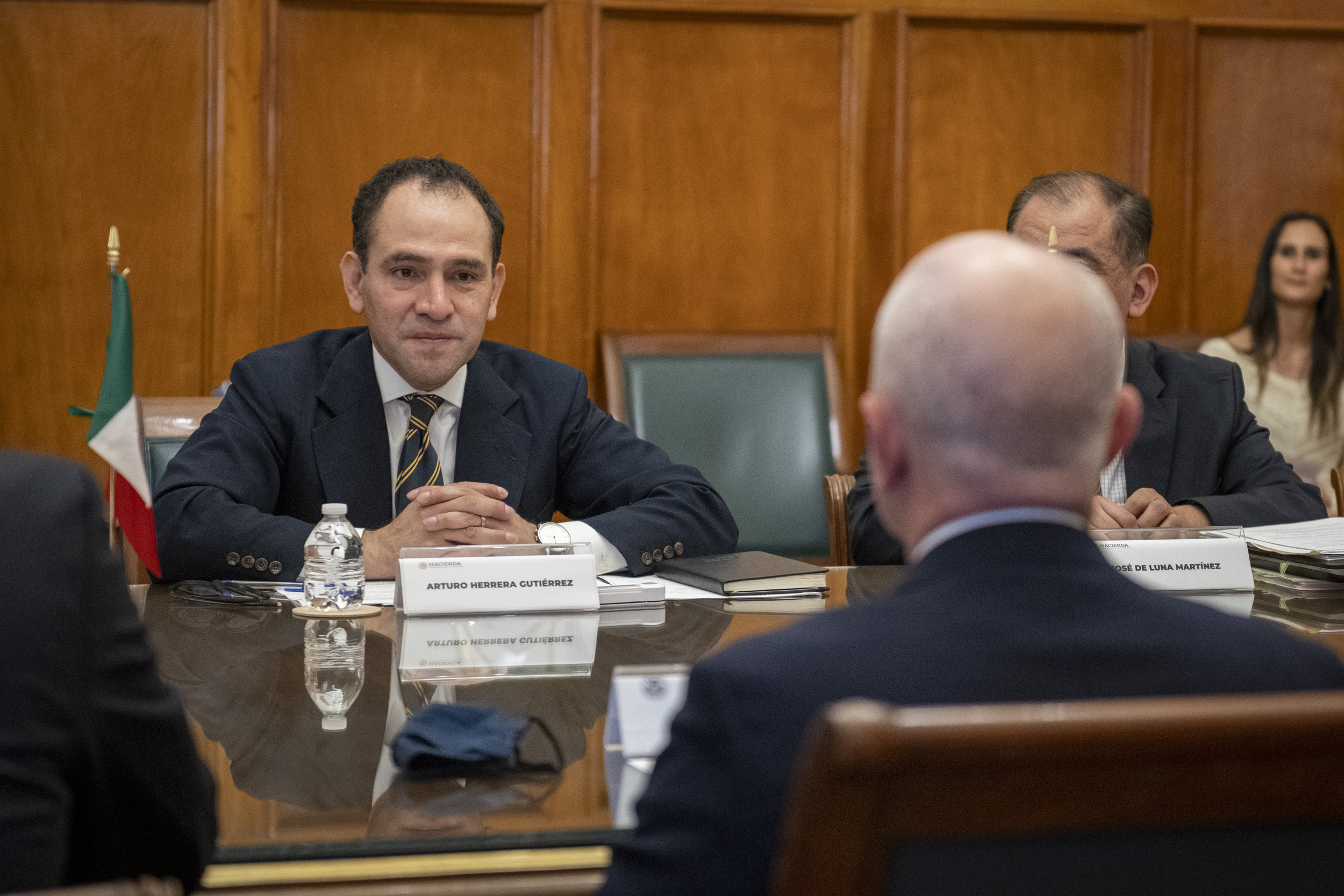
Herrera meets with U.S. Homeland Security Secretary Alejandro Mayorkas in Mexico City in June 2021.

On June 9, 2021, President Andrés Manuel López Obrador announced that Herrera would step down as Secretary of Finance and Public Credit and nominate him as governor of the Bank of Mexico in December 2021. Herrera had previously served as Assistant Secretary in the same office. From 2000 to 2006 he served as secretary of finances for Mexico City under both AMLO and Alejandro Encinas Rodríguez. He worked for the World Bank 2010 to 2017.

== Education ==
Arturo Herrera received a bachelor's degree in economics from the Universidad Autónoma Metropolitana (UAM), a master's degree in economics from El Colegio de México (Colmex), and has done studies towards a doctorate from New York University (NYU). He has taught classes in economics at Colmex and NYU.

== Bank of Mexico ==
In anticipation of the end of Alejandro Díaz de León term as governor of Bank of Mexico, AMLO announced his intention of proposing Herrera to Congress as Díaz de León's successor. At the same time Rogelio Ramírez de la O is announced as Herrera's replacement as secretary of finance.

== Family and personal life ==
Herrera was born in Actopan, Hidalgo, Mexico, on March 21, 1968. His father was Arturo Herrera Cabañas, a friend of composer Eduardo Mata, and his mother is Irma Gutiérrez Mejía. He has two brothers, Tonatiuh Herrera Gutiérrez and Yuri Herrera Gutiérrez; his uncle Rafael was municipal president of Actopan, who began the Feria de Barbacoa in the community.
