= David Ibarra Muñoz =

Mexican politician

Secretary of Finance and Public Credit
- In office 17 November 1977 – 16 March 1982
- President: José López Portillo
- Preceded by: Julio Rodolfo Moctezuma
- Succeeded by: Jesús Silva Herzog

Personal details
- Born: 14 January 1930 (age 96) Santiago de Querétaro, Querétaro
- Party: Institutional Revolutionary Party (PRI)
- Education: UNAM, Stanford University
- Profession: Economist

David Ibarra Muñoz (born 14 January 1930) is a Mexican economist who served as Secretary of Finance (1977–82) during most of José López Portillo's administration. He currently works as an independent advisor and serves in the board of directors of Grupo Carso and América Móvil.

Ibarra Muñoz was born in Santiago de Querétaro, Querétaro, into a family led by David Ibarra, an engineer. He graduated from the National Autonomous University of Mexico (UNAM) with bachelor's degrees in public accounting (1952) and economics (1957) and from Stanford University with a doctorate degree in economics (1961).

He has lectured in finance, planning and economics at the National University, where he has also served as secretary of social services (1955–57) and as director of graduate studies in the Faculty School of Economics (1967–69). In 1958 he joined the United Nations Economic Commission for Latin America and the Caribbean as an economist in Santiago de Chile, Chile, and two years later he moved back to Mexico City to lead the development research department at its regional office; which he chaired from 1970 to 1973.

When José López Portillo assumed the presidency of Mexico, he served briefly as director-general of Nacional Financiera but was called on 17 November 1977 to substitute the secretary of finance, Julio Rodolfo Moctezuma. After failing to control inflation, facing a steep decline in oil prices and making, in his own words, "a series of economic policy blunders", he was asked to step down by the president in September 1982 (barely three months before the end of the presidential term) to chair the then-recently nationalized National Bank of Mexico (Banamex).
