= Ricardo García Sainz =

Mexican politician (1930–2015)

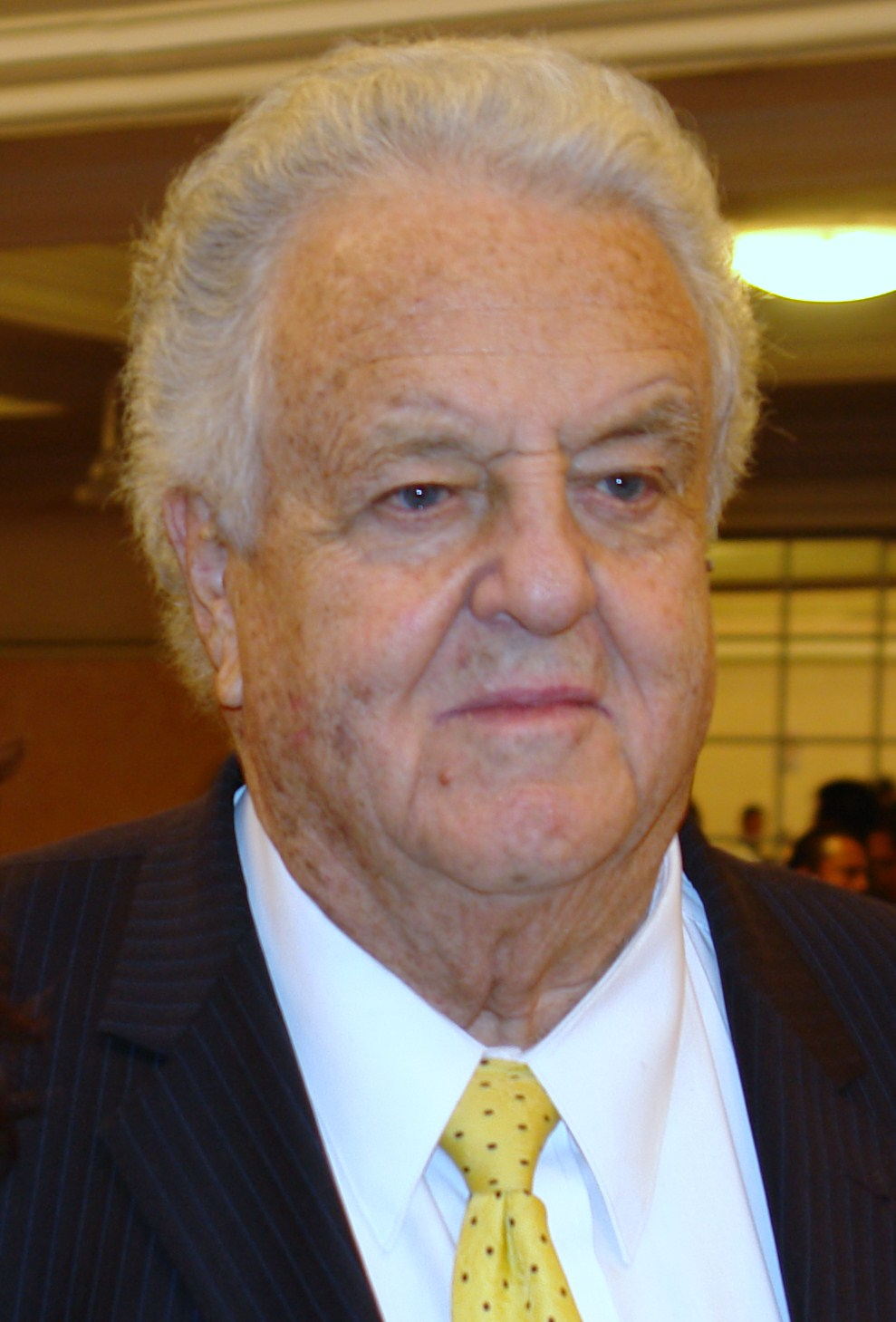
Ricardo Garcia Sainz Lavista

Ricardo García Sainz Lavista (9 June 1930 – 23 August 2015) was a Mexican politician and administrator. He was director of the Mexican Social Security Institute between 1982 and 1991. He served in the Chamber of Deputies for the Party of the Democratic Revolution between 1997 and 2000 as part of the LVII Legislature of the Mexican Congress.

== Career ==
García Sainz was born on 9 June 1930. He studied law at the National Autonomous University of Mexico. He was member of the Institutional Revolutionary Party between 1953 and 1993.

He was director of the Mexican Social Security Institute between 1982 and 1991. García Sainz was a federal deputy for the Party of the Democratic Revolution between 1997 and 2000 as part of the LVII Legislature of the Mexican Congress.

He died on 23 August 2015, aged 85, after having suffered from heart problems for several weeks.
