= Secretariat of Finance and Public Credit =

Mexican government finance ministry

Coordinates: 19.397°N 99.216°W

Mexico Secretariat of the Treasury and Public Credit
- Secretaría de Hacienda y Crédito Público
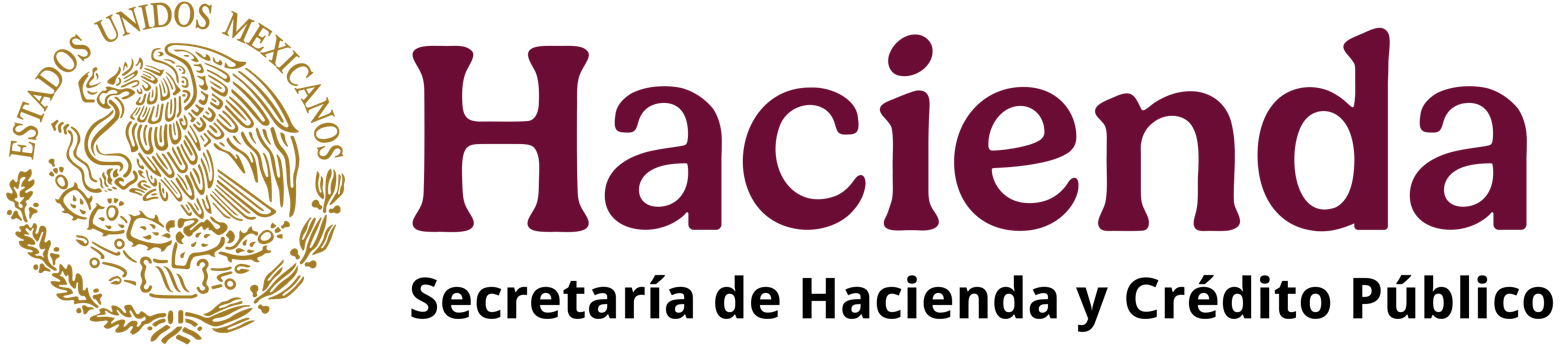
- logo of the Secretariat of the Treasury and Public Credit

Agency overview
- Formed: 1821
- Jurisdiction: Federal government of Mexico
- Headquarters: Palacio Nacional, Plaza de la Constitución s/n, Col. Centro, Deleg. Cuauhtémoc. Ciudad de México
- Employees: 7,850
- Annual budget: $27.4 billion (FY 2010)
- Agency executive: Edgar Amador Zamora
- Child agency: Comisión Nacional Bancaria y de Valores
- Website: http://www.shcp.gob.mx/

The Secretariat of the Treasury and Public Credit (Spanish: Secretaría de Hacienda y Crédito Público, SHCP) is the finance ministry of Mexico.

The Secretary of the Treasury is the head of the department, and is a member of the federal executive cabinet, appointed to the post by the President of the Republic, with the approval of the Chamber of Deputies.

Recently, the institution has been promoting a financial inclusion policy and is now a member of the Alliance for Financial Inclusion. This position is analogous to the Secretary of the Treasury in the United States of America or to the finance ministers of other nations.

- Proposes and directs the Federal Government's economic policy as regards finances, tax, spending, income and public debt and statistics, geography and information, in order to ensure quality, equitable, inclusive and sustained economic growth.

Mexican Customs Bureau (Administración General de Aduanas) is part of the Mexican Tax Administration Service, the government body entrusted with the collection of taxes at the national level. Both departments answer to the Treasurer.

== List of secretaries ==
- President Benito Juárez
  - (1868): Matías Romero
  - (1868): José María Garmendia
  - (1868–1872): Matías Romero
  - (1872): Francisco Mejía Escalada
- President Sebastián Lerdo de Tejada
  - (1872–1876): Francisco Mejía Escalada
- President Porfirio Díaz
  - (1876–1877): Justo Benítez
  - (1877): Francisco Landero y Cos
  - (1877–1879): Matías Romero
  - (1879): José Hipólito Ramírez
  - (1879–1880): Trinidad García
  - (1880): Manuel H. Toro
  - (1880): Roberto Núñez
- President Manuel González Flores
  - (1880–1881): Francisco Landero y Cos
  - (1881): Roberto Núñez
  - (1882 - 1884): Jesús Fuentes y Muñiz
  - (1884): Miguel T. de la Peña
- President Porfirio Díaz
  - (1884–1891): Manuel Dublán
  - (1891–1892): Benito Gómez Farías
  - (1892): Matías Romero
  - (1892–1911): José Yves Limantour
- President Francisco León de la Barra
  - (1911): Ernesto Madero Farías
- President Francisco I. Madero
  - (1911–1913): Ernesto Madero Farías
- President Victoriano Huerta
  - (1913): Toribio Esquivel Obregón
  - (1913): Enrique Gorostieta González
  - (1913–1914): Adolfo de la Lama
  - (1914): Gilberto Trujillo
- President Francisco Carvajal
  - (1914): Gilberto Trujillo
- President Venustiano Carranza
  - (1914): Felícitos Villarreal
  - (1914): Carlos M. Ezquerro
  - (1914): José J. Reynoso
  - (1914): Rafael Nieto Compeán
  - (1914–1917): Luis Cabrera Lobato
  - (1917–1919): Rafael Nieto Compeán
  - (1919–1920): Luis Cabrera
- President Adolfo de la Huerta
  - (1920–1920) : Salvador Alvarado
- President Álvaro Obregón
  - (1920–1923) : Adolfo de la Huerta
  - (1923–1924) : Alberto J. Pani
- President Plutarco Elías Calles
  - (1924–1927) : Alberto J. Pani
  - (1927–1928) : Luis Montes de Oca
- President Emilio Portes Gil
  - (1928–1930) : Luis Montes de Oca
- President Pascual Ortiz Rubio
  - (1930–1932) : Luis Montes de Oca
  - (1932–1932) : Alberto J. Pani
- President Abelardo L. Rodríguez
  - (1932–1933) : Alberto J. Pani
  - (1933–1934) : Plutarco Elías Calles
  - (1934–1934) : Marte Rodolfo Gómez
- President Lázaro Cárdenas del Río
  - (1934–1935) : Narciso Bassols
  - (1935–1940) : Eduardo Suárez Aránzolo
- President Manuel Ávila Camacho
  - (1940–1946) : Eduardo Suárez Aránzolo
- President Miguel Alemán
  - (1946–1952) : Ramón Beteta Quintana
- President Adolfo Ruiz Cortines
  - (1952–1958) : Antonio Carrillo Flores
- President Adolfo López Mateos
  - (1958–1964) : Antonio Ortíz Mena
- President Gustavo Díaz Ordaz
  - (1964–1970) : Antonio Ortíz Mena
  - (1970–1970) : Hugo B. Margáin
- President Luis Echeverría
  - (1970–1973) : Hugo B. Margáin
  - (1973–1975) : José López Portillo
  - (1975–1976) : Mario Ramón Beteta
- President José López Portillo
  - (1976–1977) : Julio Rodolfo Moctezuma
  - (1977–1982) : David Ibarra Muñoz
  - (1982–1982) : Jesús Silva-Herzog Flores
- President Miguel de la Madrid
  - (1982–1986) : Jesús Silva-Herzog Flores
  - (1986–1988) : Gustavo Petricioli
- President Carlos Salinas de Gortari
  - (1988–1994) : Pedro Aspe Armella
- President Ernesto Zedillo
  - (1994–1994) : Jaime Serra Puche
  - (1994–1998) : Guillermo Ortíz Martínez
  - (1998–2000) : José Ángel Gurría
- President Vicente Fox
  - (2000–2006) : Francisco Gil Díaz
- President Felipe Calderón Hinojosa
  - (2006–2009) : Agustín Carstens
  - (2009–2011) : Ernesto Cordero Arroyo
  - (2011–2012) : José Antonio Meade Kuribreña
- President Enrique Peña Nieto
  - (2012–2016) : Luis Videgaray Caso
  - (2016–2017) : José Antonio Meade Kuribreña
  - (2017–2018) : José Antonio González Anaya
- President Andrés Manuel López Obrador
  - (2018–2019) : Carlos Manuel Urzúa Macías
  - (2019–2021) : Arturo Herrera Gutiérrez
  - (2021–2024): Rogelio Ramírez de la O
- President Claudia Sheinbaum Pardo
  - (2024–2025): Rogelio Ramírez de la O
  - (2025–present): Edgar Amador Zamora
