= Cabinet of Ernesto Zedillo =

Government of Mexico 1994–2000

Members of the cabinet of the President Ernesto Zedillo (1994–2000).

== List ==
- Chief of Staff
  - (1994 - 2000): Liébano Saénz
- Minister of the Interior
  - (1994 - 1995): Esteban Moctezuma
  - (1995 - 1998): Emilio Chuayffet
  - (1998 - 1999): Francisco Labastida Ochoa
  - (1999 - 2000): Diódoro Carrasco
- Secretary of Foreign Affairs
  - (1994 - 1998): José Ángel Gurría
  - (1998 - 2000): Rosario Green
- Secretary of Nacional Defense
  - (1994 - 2000): Enrique Cervantes Aguirre
- Secretary of the Navy
  - (1994 - 2000): José Ramón Lorenzo Franco
- Secretary of Revenue and Public Credit
  - (1994): Jaime Serra Puche
  - (1994 - 1998): Guillermo Ortiz Martínez
  - (1998 - 2000): José Ángel Gurría
- Secretary of Social Development
  - (1994 - 1998): Carlos Rojas
  - (1998 - 1999): Esteban Moctezuma
  - (1999 - 2000): Carlos Jarque
- Secretary of Environment, Natural Resources and Fisheries
  - (1994 - 2000): Julia Carabias
- Secretary of Energy
  - (1994 - 1995): Ignacio Pichardo Pagaza
  - (1995 - 1997): Jesús Reyes Heroles González Garza
  - (1997 - 2000): Luis Téllez
- Secretary of Commerce and Industrial Foment
  - (1994 - 2000): Herminio Blanco Mendoza
- Secretariat of Agriculture, Livestock and Rural Development
  - (1994 - 1995): Arturo Warman
  - (1995 - 1998): Francisco Labastida Ochoa
  - (1998 - 2000): Romárico Arroyo
- Secretary of Communications and Transportation
  - (1994): Guillermo Ortiz Martínez
  - (1994 - 2000): Carlos Ruiz Sacristán
- Administrative Development Comptroller's Secretary
  - (1994 - 1995): Norma Samaniego
  - (1995 - 2000): Arsenio Farell Cubillas
- Secretary of Public Education
  - (1994 - 1995): Fausto Alzati
  - (1995 - 2000): Miguel Limón Rojas
- Secretary of Health
  - (1994 - 1999): Juan Ramón de la Fuente
  - (1999 - 2000): José Antonio González Fernández
- Secretary of Labor
  - (1994 - 1995): Santiago Oñate Laborde
  - (1995 - 1998): Javier Bonilla
  - (1998 - 1999): José Antonio González Fernández
  - (1999 - 2000): Mariano Palacios Alcocer
- Secretary of the Agrarian Reform
  - (1994 - 1995): Miguel Limón Rojas
  - (1995 - 1999): Arturo Warman
  - (1999 - 2000): Eduardo Robledo Rincón
- Secretaría de Turismo
  - (1994 - 1997): Silvia Hernández
  - (1997 - 2000): Oscar Espinoza Villarreal
- Attorney General
  - (1994 - 1996): Antonio Lozano Gracia
  - (1996 - 2000): Jorge Madrazo Cuéllar
- Head of Government of the Federal District
  - (1994 - 1997): Oscar Espinoza Villarreal
