= Agustín Carstens =

Mexican economist

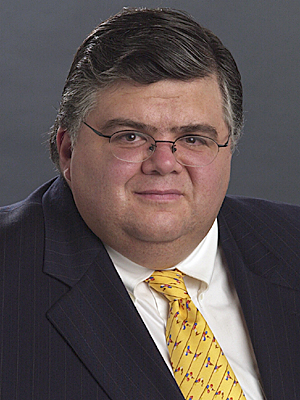

General Manager of the Bank for International Settlements
- In office 1 December 2017 – 30 June 2025
- Chair: Jens Weidmann; François Villeroy de Galhau
- Preceded by: Jaime Caruana
- Succeeded by: Pablo Hernández de Cos

Governor of the Bank of Mexico
- In office 1 January 2010 – 30 November 2017
- Preceded by: Guillermo Ortiz Martínez
- Succeeded by: Alejandro Díaz de León

Secretary of Finance and Public Credit
- In office 1 December 2006 – 9 December 2009
- President: Felipe Calderón
- Preceded by: Francisco Gil Díaz
- Succeeded by: Ernesto Cordero

Personal details
- Born: 9 June 1958 (age 68) Mexico City, Mexico
- Height: 180 cm (5 ft 11 in)
- Spouse: Catherine Mansell
- Education: Mexico Autonomous Institute of Technology (BA); University of Chicago (MA, PhD)

Agustín Guillermo Carstens Carstens (born 9 June 1958 in Mexico City) is a Mexican economist who has served as the general manager of the Bank for International Settlements from 1 December 2017 to 30 June 2025. He served as governor of the Bank of Mexico from 1 January 2010 to 30 November 2017. In 2011, Carstens, along with Christine Lagarde, was one of the two final candidates to become the managing director of the International Monetary Fund. He previously served as secretary of finance in the cabinet of Felipe Calderón (2006–09), as deputy managing director of the International Monetary Fund (2003–06) and as treasurer of the Bank of Mexico. In 2011 he was included in the 50 Most Influential ranking of Bloomberg Markets Magazine.

Carstens took up his appointment as the general manager at the Bank for International Settlements in Basel, Switzerland, where he was appointed to a five-year term, starting on 1 December 2017.

== Early years ==
Carstens graduated with a bachelor's degree in economics from the Mexico Autonomous Institute of Technology (ITAM). After working as an intern in the Bank of Mexico he received a scholarship and completed both a master's degree (1983) and a doctorate in economics (1985) at the University of Chicago. His thesis advisor was Michael Mussa, former economic counselor and director of the Department of Research at the International Monetary Fund from 1991 to 2001.

He is married to Catherine Mansell, an American academic, writer and economist who has authored several books on finance and on literary fiction and nonfiction under the pen name C. M. Mayo.

In the mid-1980s Carstens returned to Mexico and rejoined the Bank of Mexico. Before turning thirty he was appointed treasurer, effectively taking charge of the national reserves. Rising through the ranks in the early 1990s, he was appointed chief of staff of chairman Miguel Mancera, and served as Director General of Economic Research at the end of the 1990s, in charge of designing the Bank's economic policy with Governor Guillermo Ortiz Martínez in the aftermath of the Tequila Crisis and the Russian default crisis. While at the bank he produced several research articles on the Mexican economy and, in particular, co-authored an analysis of the Mexican Crisis along with then Deputy Governor Francisco Gil Díaz, which suggests the Mexican crisis was to a large extent an avoidable run on the Mexican peso brought about by external circumstances and political problems.

== International Monetary Fund ==
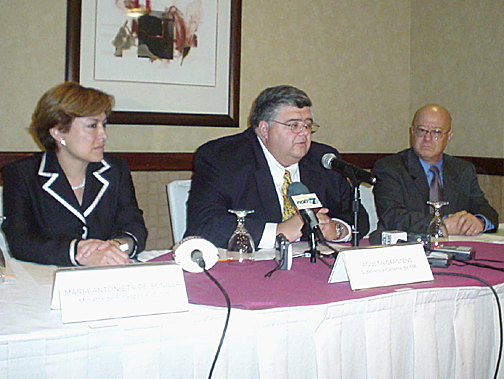
Sitting between the minister of finance and the president of the Bank of Guatemala after an official visit to the country, on 8 July 2005.

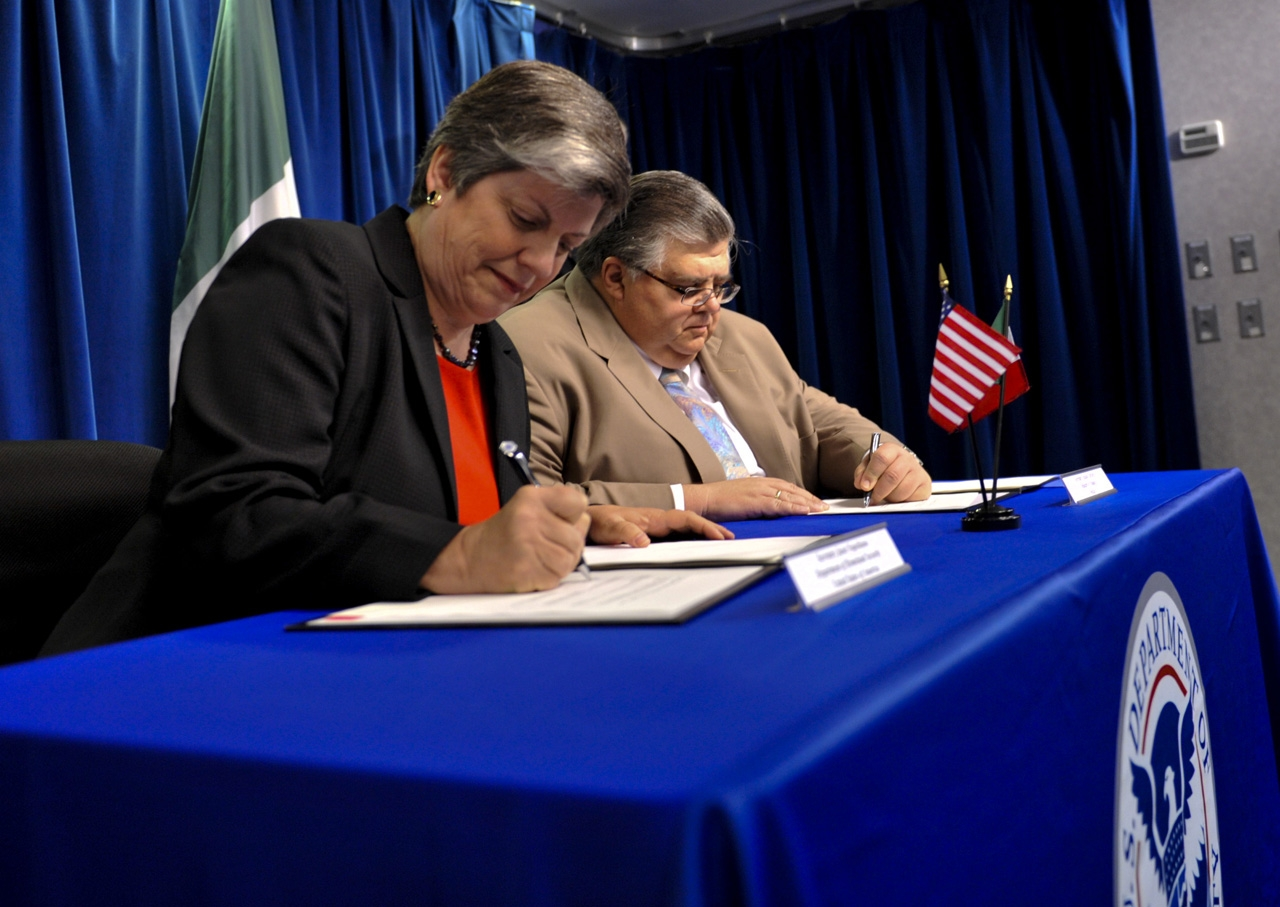
U.S. Secretary Janet Napolitano and Secretary of Finance and Public Credit Agustín Carstens signing a Letter of Intent that aimed to increase security in both countries and facilitate the flow of legal travel and trade, June 2009

After many years at the Bank of Mexico, Carstens took a position at the IMF and served as the deputy managing director – one of three deputies reporting to the director and the board— from 1 August 2003 to 16 October 2006.

Carstens left the IMF to coordinate the economic policy program of Felipe Calderón, then president-elect of Mexico, who appointed him as secretary of finance shortly after the election was validated.

== Secretary of Finance ==
On 26 March 2007, Carstens was additionally appointed new chairman of the joint World Bank/IMF Development Committee, a position customarily occupied by a developing country finance minister.

As secretary, Carstens took the unconventional decision to hedge Mexico's oil earnings for 2009 against possible price falls, leading to an $8 billion profit for the country.

In the aftermath of the 2007 popular protests against rising food prices, Carstens regarded high food prices as a positive driver for investment in agriculture.

== Bank of Mexico ==
Carstens was nominated to the Bank of Mexico on 9 December 2009 by President Felipe Calderón, replacing 12-year veteran Guillermo Ortiz, who reduced inflation from double digits to 4 percent by the end of 2009. He was confirmed by the Senate on 15 December 2009 with 81 votes in favor and 19 votes against.

== Economic views ==
He identifies five characteristics of business cycles in emerging economies that distinguish them from those in industrialized nations:

1. Business cycles in emerging economies are strongly tied to those in industrialized nations.
2. Cycles in emerging economies are more volatile
3. Volatility of emerging economies can be affected by additional factors that don't affect industrialized economies, such as price fluctuations
4. Rapid capital outflows made possible under corporate globalization can have severely harmful effects on emerging economies
5. Emerging economies are subject to the problems associated with exchange-rate regimes

Carstens claims that the solution to these problems is for emerging nations to:

1. Adopt more open trade and investment regimes
2. Allow market control of interest rates
3. Ensure that their banks are robust enough to handle severe macroeconomic changes
4. Enact structural changes such as central bank autonomy, privatization of production, reduced regulations over labor markets and reduced dependence on foreign savings

Carstens has been a critic of cryptocurrencies, calling them “a bubble,” a “Ponzi scheme” and an “environmental disaster,” but has left the door open to some uses in the future, although he does not see stablecoins as the answer.

== Other activities ==
Carstens currently serves as the International Advisory Board Member of the Global Finance & Technology Network.

Political offices
Preceded by Francisco Gil Díaz	Secretary of Finance and Public Credit; 2006–2009	Succeeded by Ernesto Cordero
Government offices
Preceded by Guillermo Ortiz Martínez	Governor of the Bank of Mexico; 2010–2017	Succeeded by Alejandro Díaz de León
Diplomatic posts
Preceded by Jaime Caruana	General Manager of the Bank for International Settlements; 2017–2025	Succeeded by Pablo Hernández de Cos
