= Instituto Tecnológico Autónomo de México =

Private university in Mexico City, Mexico

Autonomous Technological Institute of Mexico
- Instituto Tecnológico Autónomo de México
- Former name: Technological Institute of Mexico (ITM)
- Motto: "Por un México más libre, más justo y más próspero."
- Motto in English: "For a freer, fairer and more prosperous Mexico."
- Type: Private
- Established: 1946
- Founder: Raúl Baillères
- Rector: Arturo Manuel Fernández Pérez
- Faculty: 239
- Students: 4,962 (as of 2022)
- Location: Álvaro Obregón, Mexico City, Mexico; 19.345080°N 99.200004°W
- Campus: Urban
- Colours: Dark green
- Nickname: Itamitas
- Mascot: Colmillo
- Website: http://www.itam.mx/

The Autonomous Technological Institute of Mexico (Spanish: Instituto Tecnológico Autónomo de México), commonly known as ITAM, is a private university located in Mexico City. It is one of Mexico's most important institutions of higher learning; highly prestigious in the social sciences. It is also considered one of Mexico's think tanks and has the highest rank of admission to the Mexican Foreign Service.

== History ==
It was originally an Economics School and one year later it opened its undergraduate business school. Due to the opening of the Accounting School, the institute grew from 52 students in 1947 to 500 in 1951. In 1963, by government decree, the ITAM was recognized as a "Free University School" and the school added the word "autonomous" to its name. However the inclusion of the word autonomous in its name was not recognized officially by the government until 1985.

During the 1970s new programs were added including applied mathematics (1974), social science (1975) and a Master of Business Administration (1974). In the 1980s and '90s the additions were: law (1980), actuarial science (1982), computer science (1983), political science (1991, instead of social science), international relations (1992), telematics (1993) and industrial engineering (1997). During the last decade the academic offer was increased by the establishment of business engineering (2004), financial management and mechatronics (2010).

== Campuses ==
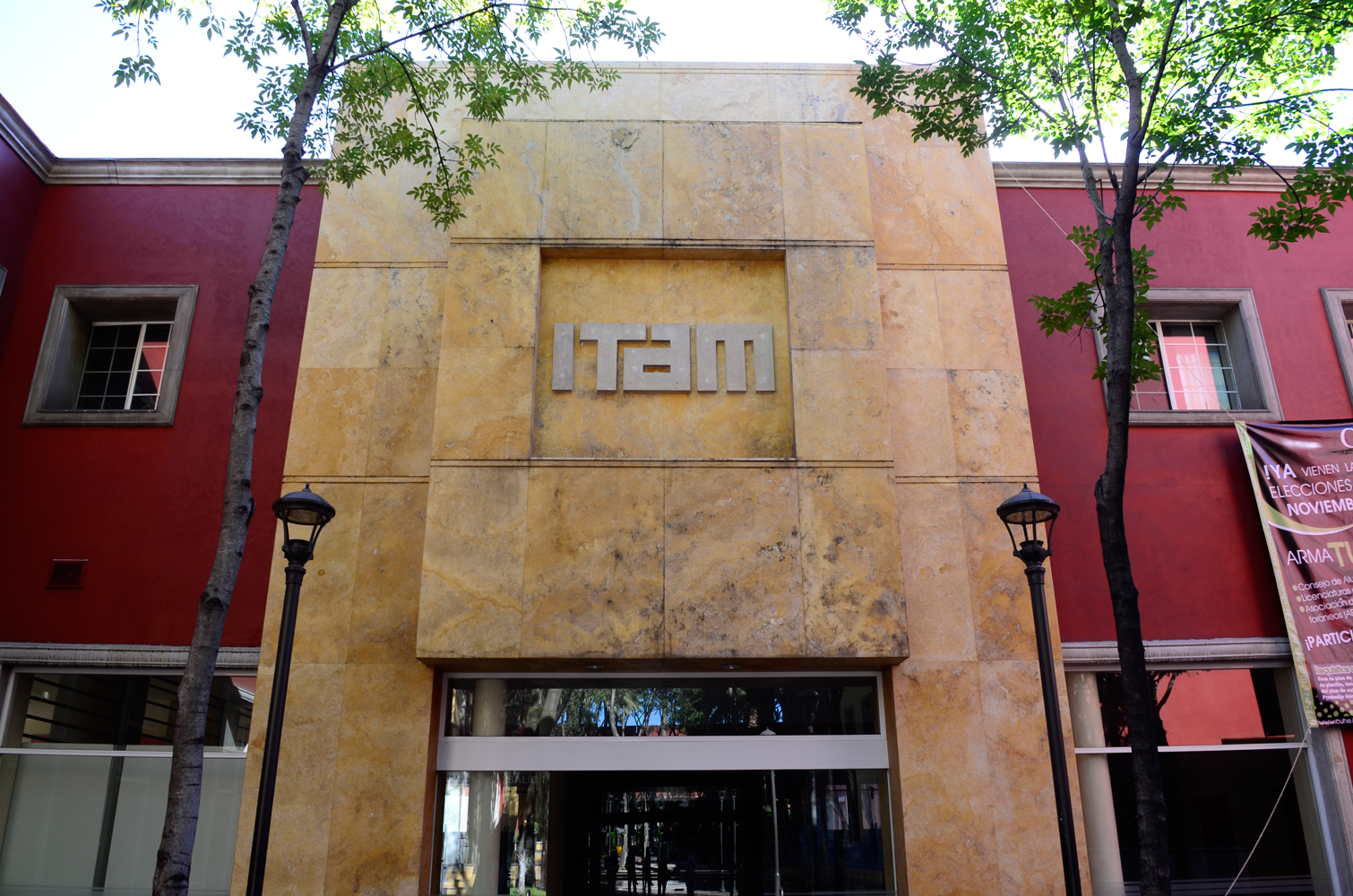
Plaza Roja, at Campus Río Hondo

During its first four years the ITAM was originally located in a house in Mexico City's centro in 518 La Palma street. In 1950 the institute moved to 65 Serapio Rendón street in the Colonia San Rafael. During the late 1950s it moved once more to a new building built specially for the institute at the corner of Marina Nacional street and Lago Zirahuen street in the Colonia Anáhuac. Finally, in 1978, ITAM moved to its current campus in 1 Río Hondo, in San Ángel. In 1991 the smaller graduate school campus, in 939 Camino Santa Teresa, was opened.

== Administration and organization ==
=== Rectors ===
During its 60 years ITAM has had eight rectors:

- Arturo Fernández Pérez, (1992 to date).
- Javier Beristain Iturbide, (1972–1991).
- Antonio Carrillo Flores, (1971–1972).
- Joaquín Gómez Morín, (1968–1971).
- Enrique Moreno de Tagle, (1967–1968).
- Gustavo Petricioli Iturbide, (1967).
- Agustín de la Llera, (1952–1967).
- Eduardo García Máynez, (1946–1951).

=== Academic divisions (schools) ===
Today the institute has 38 academic programs dependent on and organized in 5 academic divisions, subdivided in 14 academic departments (equivalent to Schools). The academic programs include Licenciaturas and Ingenierias (equivalent to B.A., B.Sc. and LL.B.), as well as Masters (M.A., MBA and M.Sc.) and a Ph.D. program.

==== Academic Division of Economics, Law and Social Sciences (School of Economics, Law and Social Sciences) ====
This division is in charge of:

- B.A./B.Sc. in economics
- B.A. in political science
- LL.B.
- M.A. in economics (applied economics)
- M.A. in human rights
- M.Sc. in economic theory
- Ph.D. in economics

===== Department of Economics =====
The ITAM, through this department, offers an education in modern economics, with a considerable emphasis on analytic techniques and economic models, in line with the subjects being taught in economics departments around the world. The Department of Economics has been especially influential. It is a major feeder for Latin American candidates into top international graduate programs, and has played an important role in the economic liberalization process that the Mexican Government started in the mid 1980s; in the last 20 years most of Mexico's Secretaries and Deputy Secretaries of Finance have been either ITAM professors or alumni. The department is ranked as the best Economics school in Mexico, depending on the survey, and one of the Top 75 Economics departments globally.

===== Department of Political Science =====
The Department of Political Science has been considered the leading faculty in the field since the mid 1980s. With the formal change of the major in 1991, the program was adapted to modern American political science, and thus incorporated important tools like mathematics, economics and statistics. The program has since been a tremendous success, becoming a leading school in the subject. This is largely due to the number of students and full-time faculty with PhDs from other leading universities such as Harvard, Stanford, Columbia, Duke, Chicago, Michigan, Princeton, UCLA, UCSD, and Yale. Many of its undergraduate students are recruited in the best universities in the United States and Europe and others are employed in the federal and local governments and political parties.

==== Academic Division of Management and Accountancy (Business School) ====
The division is in charge of:

- B.A. in Business Administration.
- B.A. in Public Accountancy and Financial Strategy.
- B.A. in Financial Management.
- Master of Business Administration (MBA).
- Executive MBA.
- M.A. in International Management.
- M.A. in Management Sciences.
- M.A. in Marketing.
- M.A. in Accountancy.
- M.Sc. in Finances.

==== Academic Division of Actuarial Science, Mathematics and Statistics (School of Actuarial, Mathematics and Statistics Sciences) ====
The division is in charge of:

- B.A. in Data Science.
- B.Sc. in Applied Mathematics.
- B.Sc. in Actuarial Science.
- M.Sc. in Risk Management.
- M.Sc. in Data Science.

===== Department of Mathematics =====
The Department of Mathematics at ITAM consists of full-time researchers with graduate degrees who follow active research lines and publish in internationally renowned journals. The department has also participated in the global mathematics community by hosting several international applied mathematics conferences over the years. Its main strengths lie in numerical analysis, financial mathematics, stochastic processes, real analysis and dynamic systems applied to the social sciences. Both BSc programs it maintains have been providing high level technical skills to its students, which often obtain graduate degrees abroad in Math, Finance, Economics, Statistics and Operations Research.

==== Academic Division of General and International Studies (School of General and International Studies) ====
This division is in charge of:

- B.A. in International Relations.

===== Department of International Studies =====
The Department of International Studies is one of the main research centers of diplomatic studies in Mexico and Latin America. It also coordinates the Institute of European Integration Studies (IEIE) and the Inter-American Studies Center (CEPI). Also, ITAM publishes the Latin American edition of Foreign Affairs, the American journal of international relations, and has the highest rank of admission to the Mexican Foreign Service (SEM).

===== Department of General Studies =====
Despite being known as a technocratic education center, ITAM has maintained a large group of faculty devoted to the study of philosophy, history, religion and society in its Department of General Studies. This department provides the bulk of the teaching for the core courses at ITAM: History, Ideas and Socio-Political Institutions, and Problems of the Current Society. This department edits a journal by the name of Estudios which contains mostly essays by Mexican philosophers and historians.

==== Academic Division of Engineering (School of Engineering) ====
This division is in charge of:

- B.Sc. in Industrial Engineering.
- B.Sc. in Computer Science.
- B.Sc. in Telematics.
- B.Sc. in Business Engineering (jointly with the Business School).
- B.Sc. in Mechatronics.
- M.Sc. in Information Technologies and Management.

== Academics ==
The institute is known for teaching humanities and philosophical courses inside every major, this with the objective of developing a higher sense of ethics even with majors like economics and business management.

=== Accreditations ===
All the programs at ITAM are officially accredited by the Secretaría de Educación Pública (SEP). In 2005 ITAM Business School became the first in Mexico to hold simultaneous accreditation of its programs by the Association to Advance Collegiate Schools of Business (AACSB) of the United States, the Association of MBAs of the United Kingdom and the European Quality Improvement System (EQUIS). Since 2009 the Computer Science and Industrial Engineering B.S. degrees have been accredited by ABET.

=== Faculty ===
ITAM has 239 professors and researchers, 85 percent of whom are full-time professors. 90 percent of the faculty have a graduate degree and 68 percent have a PhD. Furthermore, 20 percent of the professors are part of Sistema Nacional de Investigadores.

=== International Programs ===
ITAM is currently collaborating with SciencesPo in the ITAM/SciencePo Bachelor in International Relations dual program; the Tulane University in the ITAM/Tulane Executive MBA Program and the ITAM/Tulane Global Master in Business Administration; the Illinois Institute of Technology in the ITAM/IIT Master in Information Technologies and Management; the Universidad Autónoma de Barcelona in the ITAM/UAB Master in European Integration; the Florida International University in the ITAM/FIU Master in Accountancy.

=== Honoris Causa degrees ===
Some of the Honoris Causa degrees awarded by the ITAM include:

- David Rockefeller, prominent American banker, philanthropist, and world statesman.
- Arnold Harberger, American economist.
- Miguel Mancera, Mexican economist.
- Pedro Aspe Armella, Mexican economist.
- Plácido Arango, Mexican businessman.

=== Research ===
As a research university, ITAM has several centers dedicated to economics, law, political science, foreign affairs and business. Some include:

- Centro de Análisis e Investigación Económica (CAIE) - Research on Mexican economy
- Centro de Economía Aplicada y de Políticas Públicas (CEAPP) - Public policy research
- Centro de Estadística Aplicada - Applied Statistics
- Centro de Estudios Alonso Lujambio (CEAL) - Electoral studies, Transparency, and Parliamentary Studies
- Centro de Estudios de Competitividad (CEC) - Competition research
- Centro de Estudios de Derecho Privado - Private law
- Centro de Estudios de Derecho Público - Public law
- Centro de Estudios y Programas Interamericanos (CEPI) - Inter-American studies
- Centro de Evaluación Socioeconómica de Proyectos (CESP) - Socioeconomic project analysis
- Centro Internacional para la Investigación en Pensiones - Pension research
- Centro de Investigación Económica (CIE) - Basic economic research
- Instituto de Estudios de la Integración Europea (IEIE) - "Research for European Integration and Relations with Latin America"
- Proyecto sobre Filantropía y Sociedad Civil - "Project on Philanthropy and Civil Society"

== Notable alumni, faculty and staff ==
=== Alumni ===
Mexican presidents

- Felipe Calderón Hinojosa, 56th president of Mexico (2006–2012), graduate school.

Mexican Secretaries of Finance

- Agustín Carstens Carstens, General manager of the Bank of International Settlements (2017–), Governor of the Bank of Mexico (2009–2017); Secretary of Finance (2006–2009).
- José Antonio Meade Kuribreña, Presidential nominee for the PRI (2018); Secretary of Finance (2016–2017); Secretary of Social Development (2015–2016); Secretary of Foreign Affairs (2012–2015); Secretary of Finance (2011–2012); Secretary of Energy (2011).
- Luis Videgaray Caso, Secretary of Foreign Affairs (2016–2018); Secretary of Finance (2012–2016).
- Ernesto Javier Cordero Arroyo, Senator of Mexico (2012–2018); President of the Senate (2012–2013, 2017–2018); Secretary of Finance (2009–2011); Secretary of Social Development (2011).
- Francisco Gil Díaz, Secretary of Finance (2000–2006).
- Pedro Aspe Armella, Secretary of Finance (1988–1994).
- Gustavo Petricioli Iturbide, Secretary of Finance (1986–1988).

Other secretaries in the Mexican Government

- Alonso Lujambio Irazábal, former secretary of public education (2006–2012) and Senator of Mexico (2012).
- Alejandro Poiré Romero, former secretary of the interior (2011–2012) and current dean of the National School of Social Sciences and government at the Instituto Tecnológico y de Estudios Superiores de Monterrey.
- Francisco Javier Mayorga Castañeda, former secretary of agriculture, livestock, rural development, fisheries, and nourishment.
- Dionisio Pérez-Jácome Friscione, Senator of Mexico (1997–2000); President of the Senate (1998), former secretary of communications and transportation (2011–2012), Mexican ambassador to the OECD (2013–2017) and Ambassador to Canada (2017–2018).
- Alejandra Sota Mirafuentes, former media coordinator of the Presidency of Mexico.
- Juan Jose Suarez Coppel, former CEO and CFO of PEMEX.
- Emilio Lozoya Austin, former CEO of PEMEX.
- Ariel Cano Cuevas, former director of the National Housing Commission.
- Jaime González Aguadé, former director of the Comisión Nacional Bancaria y de Valores.
- Eduardo Pérez Motta, current CEO of the Federal Competition Commission.
- Georgina Kessel Martínez, former secretary of energy (2006–2011) and CEO of Banobras (2011–2012).
- Salomón Chertorivski Woldenberg, former secretary of health (2011–2012).
- Jesús F. Reyes Heroles, former secretary of energy (1995–1997), Mexican Ambassador to the United States (1997–2000), and CEO of PEMEX.
- Luis Téllez Kuenzler, former secretary of energy, former Secretary of Transportation and Communications, and former president of the Mexican Stock Exchange.

Government (others)

- Francisco del Río, Mexican ambassador (SEM).
- Alfredo del Mazo Maza, Governor of the State of Mexico (2017–)
- Alejandro Murat Hinojosa, Governor of Oaxaca (2016–)
- Ernesto Céspedes Oropeza, Mexican ambassador (SEM).
- Luis Carlos Ugalde, former president of Mexico's Federal Electoral Institute (IFE).
- Diódoro Carrasco Altamirano, former governor of Oaxaca (1992–1998)
- Miguel Mancera Aguayo, former governor of the Bank of Mexico.
- Eduardo Chaillo, former Minister of Tourism (1996-1998)

Politicians

- Alberto Cinta, politician affiliated to the New Alliance Party.
- Gabriela Cuevas, Senator of Mexico (2012–2018), Mayor of Miguel Hidalgo (2006–2009), President of the Interparliamentary Union (2014–2017) and current Federal Deputy in the Chamber of Deputies.
- Federico Döring, Senator of Mexico (2012–2018) and member of the Mexico City Congress (2018–)
- Tomás Ruíz González, president of New Alliance Party.
- Rodrigo Pérez-Alonso González, Federal Deputy in the LXI Legislature of the Congress of the Union and former lecturer at Universidad Iberoamericana.

Business persons

- María Asunción Aramburuzabala, Mexico's richest woman, shareholder of Grupo Modelo.
- Alberto Baillères, third richest man in Mexico and ninth in Latin America, owner of Grupo Bal, Peñoles, El Palacio de Hierro, and Grupo Nacional Provincial.
- Rodolfo Corcuera, Internet entrepreneur
- Nicole Reich de Polignac, president of the board of BNP Cardi, ex- CEO of Scotiabank Inverlat Mexico

Academics

- Aaron Tornell, professor of Economics UCLA.
- Esteban Rossi-Hansberg, professor of Economics Princeton University.
- Luis Rayo Fierro, professor of management Kellogg School of Management, Northwestern University.
- Beatriz Magaloni, professor of Political Science, Stanford University.
- Ana de la O Torres, associate professor of Political Science, Yale University.
- Marco Gonzalez-Navarro, associate professor Agricultural and Resource Economics, UC-Berkeley.
- Alberto Diaz-Cayeros, director Center for Latin American Studies, Stanford University.
- Jose Luis Montiel Olea, assistant professor of Economics, Columbia University.
- Noriko Amano-Patiño, lecturer in Economics, University of Cambridge.
- Alejandro Trelles, assistant professor of Political Science, Brandeis University.
- Alejandro Díaz De la O, Associate Professor of Applied Mathematics, University College London.

Others

- Carlos Loret de Mola, journalist and news anchor.
- Franck Meyer Robredo, Mexican athlete

=== Faculty ===
Some famous faculty members include:

- Guillermo Ortiz Martínez
- Pedro Aspe Armella
- Denise Dresser
- Francisco Gil Díaz
- Luis Carlos Ugalde
- Hector Zagal
- Olga Pellicer
- José Ramón Cossío
- Romeo Ortega
- Maria Marván Laborde
