= Alfredo Harp Helú =

Mexican businessman (born 1944)

Alfredo Harp
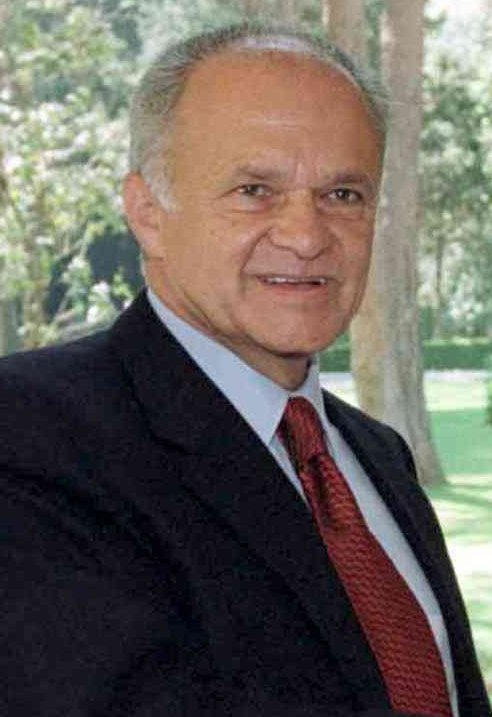
- Born: 11 March 1944 (age 82); Mexico City, Mexico
- Education: Accounting
- Alma mater: National Autonomous University of Mexico (BS)
- Occupations: Businessman, philanthropist
- Relatives: Carlos Slim (cousin)
- Baseball career

Member of the Mexican Professional

Baseball Hall of Fame
- Induction: 2023
- Website: www.alfredoharphelu.com

Alfredo Harp Helú (born 1944) is a Mexican businessman of Lebanese origin, and as of 2011, with a net worth of $1.5 billion, is according to Forbes the 974th richest person in the world. He is also the cousin of multibillionaire Carlos Slim.

In 2018, Alfredo Harp Helu ranked #1,867 on the Forbes World's Billionaires list, with wealth listed at US $1.2 billion.

== Biography ==
Born on 11 March 1944 in Mexico City, Harp is most famous for being the former owner of the biggest Latin American and Mexican bank, Banamex (now part of Citigroup), and was a billion-dollar beneficiary of Citigroup's 2001 buyout of Banamex. He is also owner of the telecommunication company, Avantel, the second largest telephone company in Mexico (now part of Axtel).

On 23 March 2019, the Diablos Rojos del México (Red Devils) opened their new Alfredo Harp Helú baseball stadium in Mexico City.

== Personal life ==
Harp is married, with several children. He and his family with his second wife divide their time between homes in Mexico City and Oaxaca City.

=== Kidnapping ===
In 1994, Harp's family paid about $30 million after he was held for 106 days by his kidnappers in Mexico City. The release followed a dramatic television appearance in which his son, accompanied by a family lawyer and a priest, accepted the kidnappers' terms unconditionally. At the family's request, the police did not intervene, giving rise to fears that the huge ransom would encourage more kidnappings, and adding to concerns about Mexico's stability. In 1996, authorities claimed to have recovered nearly $10 million of the Harp ransom.

In 2008, Harp attended the funeral of Fernando Martí, 14-year-old son of the founder of a chain of sporting goods stores, who had been kidnapped and murdered, despite his family's payment of a ransom. He also paid for a full-page advertisement in newspapers calling on the government to put a stop to the rising kidnapping phenomenon in Mexico.

== Philanthropy ==
Harp funds several charitable foundations:

- Fundación Alfredo Harp Helú
- Fundación Alfredo Harp Helú Oaxaca (involved in education, health, culture, and conservation in the state of Oaxaca).

== Baseball ==
He is a baseball fan, owning wholly or partly two professional baseball teams in Mexico, the Diablos Rojos del México, acquired in 1994, and the Guerreros de Oaxaca of Oaxaca City, acquired in 1996. In 2012, he became part of the MLB San Diego Padres ownership group.

Harp also founded the Alfredo Harp Helú Baseball Academy, located in San Bartolo Coyotepec, Oaxaca. The Academy's goal is to develop young baseball prospects and it is affiliated to the Diablos Rojos del México and Guerreros de Oaxaca.
