= Gustavo Petricioli =

Mexican economist and politician

Secretary of Finance and Public Credit
- In office 17 June 1986 – 30 November 1988
- President: Miguel de la Madrid
- Preceded by: Jesús Silva Herzog
- Succeeded by: Pedro Aspe

Ambassador of Mexico to the United States
- In office 17 January 1989 – 15 January 1993
- President: Carlos Salinas de Gortari
- Preceded by: Jorge Espinoza de los Reyes
- Succeeded by: Jorge Mario Montaño

Personal details
- Born: 19 August 1928 Mexico City
- Died: 9 October 1998 (aged 70) Mexico City
- Party: Revolutionary Institutional Party (PRI)
- Education: ITAM, Yale University

Gustavo Petricioli Iturbide (19 August 1928 – 9 October 1998) was a Mexican economist who served as Secretary of Finance (1986–1988) in the last cabinet of Miguel de la Madrid and as Mexican ambassador to the United States (January 1989 – 1993).

== Biography ==
Petricioli was the son of Carlos Petricioli Alarcón and Ada Iturbide Preciat. He received a high school diploma from the Monterrey Institute of Technology (ITESM), a bachelor's degree in Economics from the ITAM (1952) and a master's degree in the same discipline from Yale University (1958). He lectured on Monetary Theory at both ITAM and the National Autonomous University of Mexico (UNAM), and joined the Revolutionary Institutional Party (PRI) in 1952.

Before joining the federal cabinet Petricioli served as undersecretary of Finance (1970–74), as deputy director of the Bank of Mexico (1975–1976), and as director-general of Nacional Financiera (1982–1986). As secretary of Finance, he co-authored the Pact for Stability and Economic Growth (in Spanish: Pacto para la estabilidad y el crecimiento económico), a national strategy to control the fiscal deficit and inflation in coordination with the private sector.

Petricioli died of a heart attack on 9 October 1998 at Los Angeles Hospital, in Mexico City. He married Rosa Blanca Morales Murphy and they had two children: Gustavo and Ada. After their divorce, he remarried to Maria Luisa Castellón, mother of his next two children Hugo and Maria Luisa. Maria Luisa has two children now; Luisa and Mateo. In his honor, a remembrance book, El complejo arte de vivir: homenaje a Gustavo Petricioli, was published by Editorial Porrúa and a statue was erected at ITAM; his alma mater.
