= Rosario Green =

Mexican economist, diplomat and politician

Secretary of Foreign Affairs
- In office 7 January 1998 – 30 November 2000
- President: Ernesto Zedillo
- Preceded by: José Ángel Gurría
- Succeeded by: Jorge Castañeda Gutman

Personal details
- Born: María del Rosario Green Macías; 31 March 1941 Mexico City, Mexico
- Died: 25 November 2017 (aged 76) Mexico City, Mexico
- Party: Partido Revolucionario Institucional
- Education: UNAM
- Profession: Professor, Diplomat, Politician

María del Rosario Green Macías (31 March 1941 – 25 November 2017) was a Mexican economist, diplomat and politician.

She served as secretary of foreign affairs in the cabinet of Ernesto Zedillo (president of Mexico, 1994–2000). She was also the general secretary of the Institutional Revolutionary Party (PRI) from 2005 to 2006, and a senator for the 2006–2012 period.

== Education ==
Rosario Green held a degree in international affairs from the National Autonomous University of Mexico (UNAM) and a master's degree in economics from El Colegio de México and Columbia University, where she did postgraduate research on Latin American studies. She was awarded two doctorates honoris causa in the United States. The first one in humanistic sciences at the College of New Rochelle (New York) and the second one in law from Tufts University (Massachusetts).

== Professional career ==
Green Macías was a faculty member of UNAM, Colegio de México and the Universidad Iberoamericana and director of the Matías Romero Institute of Diplomatic Studies at the Secretariat of Foreign Affairs as well as president of Fundación Colosio. She was Ambassador to East Germany, executive secretary of the National Human Rights Commission, under-secretary of foreign affairs, assistant secretary-general for political affairs and special adviser to the secretary-general on gender issues at the United Nations, and senator for her party, the Institutional Revolutionary Party (PRI).

During the Zedillo administration, she served as the country's first female secretary of foreign affairs (January 1998 to November 2000). In 2000 she signed a joint declaration for cooperation in the war against drug-trafficking with Igor Ivanov, the head of Russian Foreign Affairs. She represented Zedillo at the ceremony of change of government of Macau when sovereignty changed from Portugal to the Chinese government. She was also involved in the negotiations for the Free Trade Agreement between Mexico and the European Union.

During the Vicente Fox administration, she served as Mexico's ambassador to Argentina. On 30 September 2005, Green succeeded Elba Esther Gordillo as general secretary of the PRI. In the general election of 2 July 2006, she was elected to the Senate as the number-one candidate on the PRI's PR list.

Rosario Green was the first director (2005–2006) and visiting professor of the Kozmetsky Center for Excellence in Global Finance at St. Edward's University in Austin, Texas, U.S.

== Publications ==
- Estado y banca transnacional en México
- Los mitos de Milton Friedman
- La deuda externa de México
- De la abundancia a la escasez de créditos
- Lecciones de Deuda Externa de México: 1983–1997

Political offices
Preceded by José Ángel Gurría Treviño	Secretary of Foreign Affairs; 1998–2000	Succeeded by Jorge Germán Castañeda Gutman
