= Helu (disambiguation) =

Helü or Helu was King of Wu in ancient China.

Helu may refer to:

- Elu, ancient form of Sinhala language
- Roy Helu, Jr., former American football player

== See also ==
- Alfredo Harp Helú, Mexican billionaire
- Carlos Slim Helú, Mexican billionaire
