= Francisco Gil Díaz =

Mexican politician

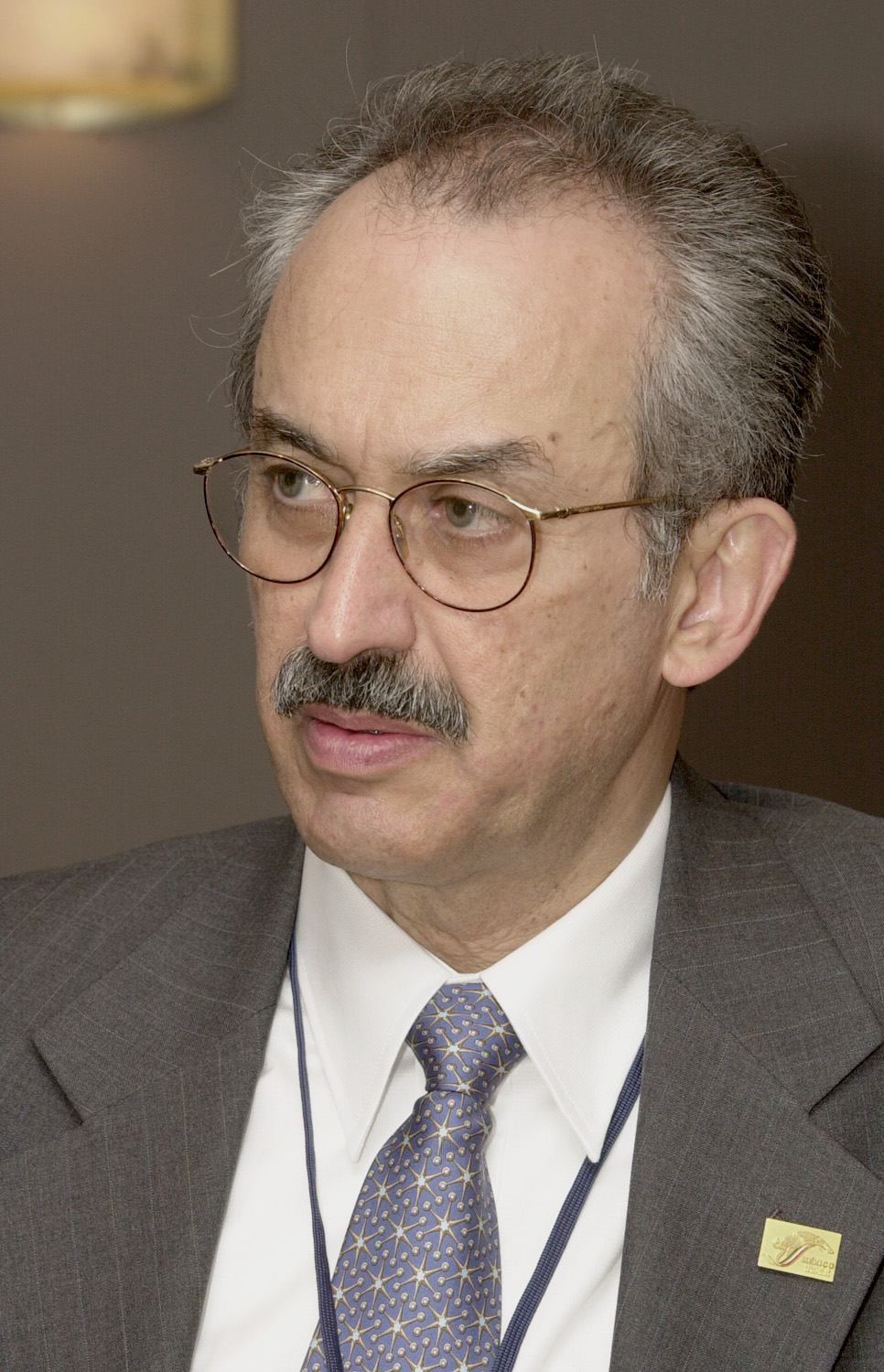

Secretary of Finance and Public Credit
- In office 1 December 2000 – 30 November 2006
- President: Vicente Fox
- Preceded by: José Ángel Gurría
- Succeeded by: Agustín Carstens

Personal details
- Born: 2 September 1943 (age 83) Mexico City, Mexico
- Party: Institutional Revolutionary Party (PRI)
- Education: Autonomous Technology Institute of Mexico, University of Chicago
- Profession: Economist

Francisco Gil Díaz (born 2 September 1943 in Mexico City) is a Mexican economist who served as Secretary of Finance in the cabinet of President Vicente Fox and currently serves as regional chairman of Telefónica for Mexico and Central America.

== Early life ==
Gil Díaz is the son of Francisco Gil Arias, a fisherman, and Ana María Díaz Perches.

He is married to Margarita White and has four children: two males and two females.

== Education ==
He received a bachelor's degree in economics from the Autonomous Technology Institute of Mexico (ITAM) and a Ph.D. in economics from the University of Chicago, in the United States.

== Career ==
In the public sector Gil Díaz has served as Undersecretary of Finance (1988–1994) and Vice-Governor of the Mexican central bank (1994–1997). In the private sector, he worked as CEO of Avantel, a Mexican telephone and internet service provider (1997 - November 2000).

In 1979, Gil Díaz joined the Institutional Revolutionary Party (PRI) and began teaching economics at the Instituto Tecnológico Autónomo de México, where he later received the distinction of Professor Emeritus in 1999. He also received further recognition and even an honorary degree in 2001 and 2009.

== Other activities ==
- European Bank for Reconstruction and Development (EBRD), Ex-Officio Member of the Board of Governors (2000-2006)
- He sits on the board of the Ibero-American University and the Anderson School of Management at UCLA.
- In his memoirs, [Fleeting Remembrances and Some Indiscretions], as well as publicly in a podcast, Gil Díaz states that he has served on the boards of the Universidad Panamericana, the RAND Corporation's PhD Program in Public Policy, and the Booth School of Business at the University of Chicago. Although independent verification for these roles is currently lacking, and would benefit from additional citations.

== Personal life ==
Gil Díaz is married to Margarita White de la Peña and has four children, including Francisco and Cristina Gil-White.
