= Liébano Saénz =

Mexican lawyer

Liébano Sáenz Ortiz (born July 22, 1949, in Nuevo Casas Grandes) is a Mexican lawyer who served as Chief of Staff in the Cabinet of president Ernesto Zedillo from 1994 to 2000.
