= Axtel =

Mexican technology company

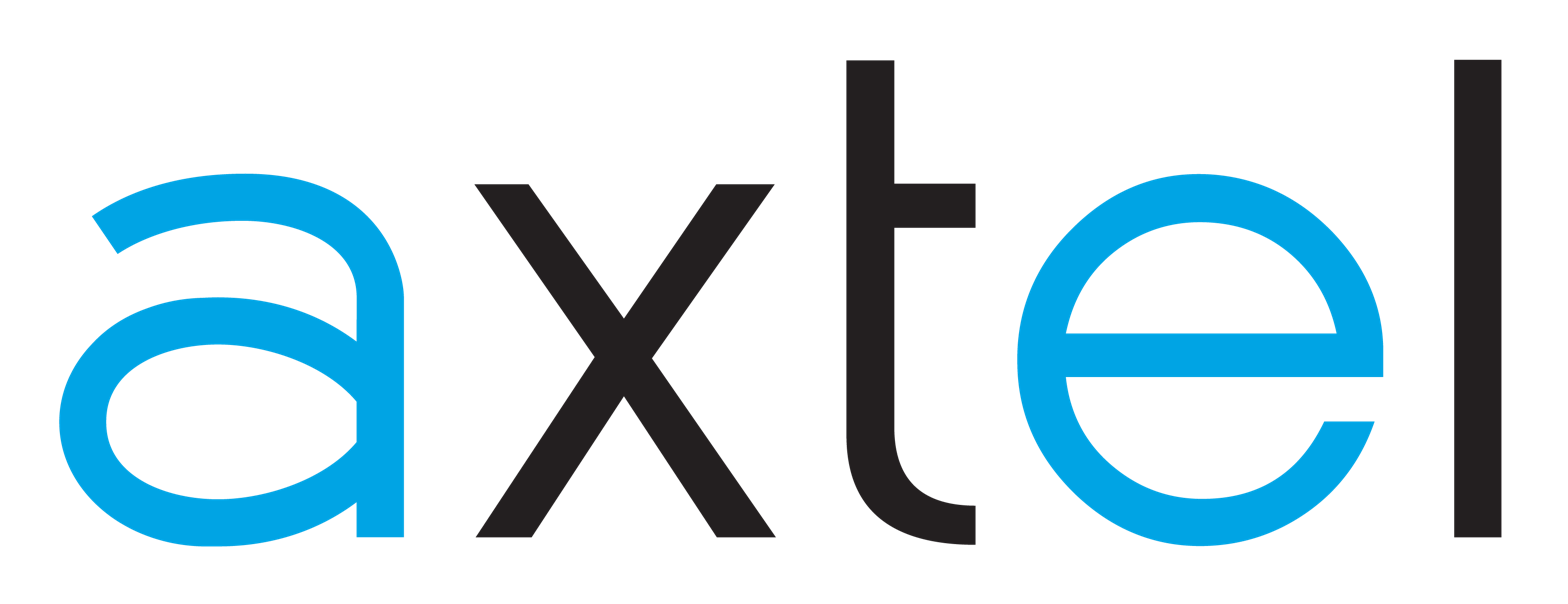
- Company type: Subsidiary and Public company (BMV: AXTEL)
- Traded as: BMV: AXTEL
- Industry: Telecommunications
- Founded: 1994; 32 years ago
- Headquarters: Monterrey, Nuevo León, Mexico
- Key people: CEO: Armando de la Peña
- Products: Enterprise Solutions; Fiber optics Cybersecurity; Cloud; Collaboration tools Mobility; Managed Services; Integrated Services
- Number of employees: 4,653 (2023)
- Website: Official website

Axtel S.A.B. de C.V., known as Axtel, is a Mexican telecommunications company headquartered in San Pedro, near Monterrey. It offers telephone, internet, and television services through FTTH in 45 cities of Mexico as well as IT Services. It is the second largest landline telephone service provider and a relevant virtual private network operator.

== History ==
Though incorporated in 1993, it wasn't until 1997 that AXTEL received authorizations from the Mexican government to operate in the radioelectrical spectrum. The company's business plan was to compete with Telmex in local telephony by bypassing phone lines and using fixed wireless communications instead, one of the largest deployments thereof in the world. It wasn't until 1999 that the company began operating in Monterrey. It later expanded to Guadalajara, and Mexico City in 2000. Then President Ernesto Zedillo made the first "national" call in the company's network, inaugurating service nationwide. At the time, news outlets around the country saw this moment as the beginning of a true open market in the local telephony business in Mexico.

On December 4, 2006, Axtel acquired Avantel Infraestructura and Avantel, S. de R.L. de C.V. (collectively Avantel).

Avantel was a provider of Internet protocol (IP) solutions. Avantel provided telecommunications services to business, government and residential customers in Mexico. Avantel was incorporated as a 55.5%-44.5% joint-venture between Banamex and MCI, primarily oriented to provide long-distance services. Avantel brought to Axtel spectrum in various frequencies, approximately 390 kilometers of metropolitan fiber optic rings, 7,700 kilometers of long-distance fiber optic network, an IP backbone and connectivity in 200 cities in Mexico, among others.

By 2007, Axtel had expanded its coverage to 20 of the most important cities in the nation. It was in this year that the company made its initial public offering in the Mexican Stock Exchange.

AXTEL provides services using a hybrid wireline and fixed wireless local access network (including 1,079.8 kilometers of metro fiber optic rings) along with 7,700 kilometers of long-haul fiber-optic network. The company's nationwide network includes 7,700 kilometers of fiber optic network with links to terminate long-distance traffic in over 200 cities.

Axtel offers local, long distance, Internet, and data services, such as virtual private lines, dedicated private lines, frame relay and Web-hosting.

== Coverage ==
Axtel claims to have enough coverage for 95% of the Mexican population and 1 Million installed phone lines.

Currently, Axtel delivers service in the following cities:

- Monterrey
- Mexico City
- Guadalajara
- Puebla
- León
- Toluca
- Querétaro
- San Luis Potosí
- Aguascalientes
- Saltillo, Coahuila
- Torreón, Coahuila
- Veracruz
- Xalapa, Veracruz
- Chihuahua
- Celaya, Guanajuato
- Irapuato
- San Juan del Rio, Queretaro
- Cuernavaca, Morelos
- Pachuca, Hidalgo
- Tijuana
- Mexicali
- Ciudad Juárez, Chihuahua
- Tampico, Tamaulipas
- Ciudad Victoria, Tamaulipas
- Morelia, Michoacan
- Hermosillo, Sonora
- Mérida, Yucatán
- Culiacán, Sinaloa
- Mazatlán, Sinaloa
- Reynosa, Tamaulipas
- Acapulco, Guerrero
- Nuevo Laredo, Tamaulipas
- Durango, Durango
- Matamoros, Tamaulipas
- Cancún, Quintana Roo
- Villahermosa, Tabasco
- Coatzacoalcos, Veracruz
- Minatitlán, Veracruz
- Zacatecas, Zacatecas
- Pénjamo, Guanajuato
- San Francisco del Rincón, Guanajuato
- Silao, Guanajuato
- Acambaro, Guanajuato
- Linares, Nuevo León
- Parras de la Fuente, Coahuila

== Trivia ==
Axtel features in its ads the Regina Spektor song Fidelity
