= Victoria Rodríguez Ceja =

Mexican economist and civil servant (born 1977)

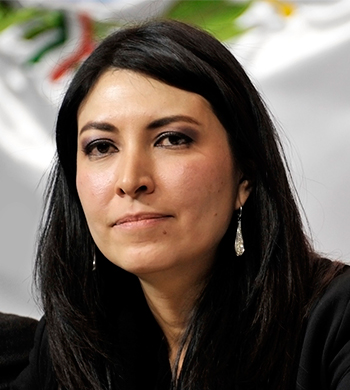
- Born: Victoria Rodríguez Ceja; October 7, 1977 (age 48); Mexico City
- Occupation(s): civil servant, economist
- Known for: Governor of the Bank of Mexico

Victoria Rodríguez Ceja (born October 7, 1977) is a Mexican economist and civil servant. She has been the governor of the Bank of Mexico since January 1, 2022, the first woman to hold the position.

Rodríguez Ceja was born in Mexico City in 1977. She began her career as a public servant in 2001 within the Government of the Federal District, during the leadership of Andrés Manuel López Obrador. From 2012 to 2018 she served as Undersecretary of Expenditure within the Ministry of Finance of the Federal District. From 2018 to 2021 she held the same position, but at the federal level, in the Ministry of Finance and Public Credit (SHCP). On December 2, 2021, the Senate of the Republic approved President López Obrador's nomination of her to occupy the position of governor of the Bank of Mexico for the 2022–2027 period, replacing Alejandro Díaz de León.

She holds a degree in economics from the Monterrey Institute of Technology and Higher Education (ITESM) and has a master's degree in economics from El Colegio de México.

As governor of the Bank of Mexico, she serves as a board member of the Bank for International Settlements.

In 2024 The Banker magazine recognized her as the central banker of the year 2024 in America.
