= José Ángel Gurría =

Mexican economist and diplomat

Ángel Gurría
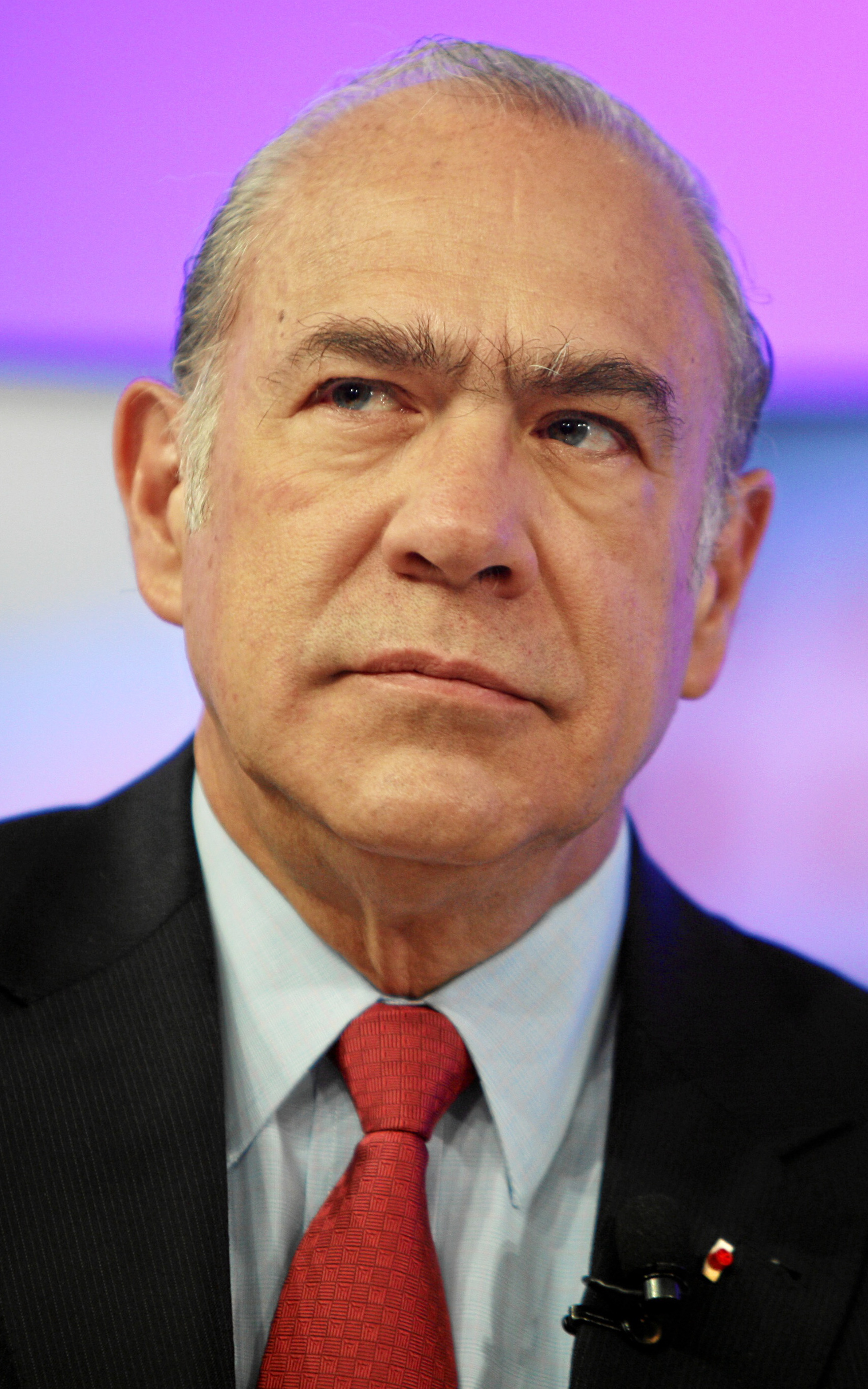
- Gurría in 2012

5th Secretary-General of the Organisation for Economic Co-operation and Development
- In office 1 June 2006 – 31 May 2021
- Preceded by: Don Johnston
- Succeeded by: Mathias Cormann

Secretary of Finance and Public Credit of Mexico
- In office 1 January 1998 – 30 November 2000
- Preceded by: Guillermo Ortiz Martínez
- Succeeded by: Francisco Gil Díaz

Secretary of Foreign Affairs of Mexico
- In office 1 December 1994 – 31 December 1997
- Preceded by: Manuel Tello Macías
- Succeeded by: Rosario Green

Personal details
- Born: 8 May 1950 (age 76) Tampico, Tamaulipas, Mexico
- Party: Revolutionary Institutional Party
- Education: National Autonomous University of Mexico
- Profession: Economist

José Ángel Gurría Treviño, also known as Ángel Gurría, (born 8 May 1950) is a Mexican economist and diplomat. From 1 June 2006 to 31 May 2021, he was the secretary-general of the Organisation for Economic Co-operation and Development (OECD).

== Early life and education ==
Born in Tampico, Tamaulipas, Gurría graduated with a bachelor's degree in Economics from the National Autonomous University of Mexico (UNAM) and undertook postgraduate studies at the University of Leeds in the United Kingdom and at Harvard University in the United States.

Besides his native Spanish, Gurría speaks French, English, Portuguese, Italian and German.

== Career ==
=== Early career ===
Gurría served in the financial area of Mexico's Federal Electricity Commission (CFE), National Development Bank (Nafinsa), Rural Development Fund, and the Office of the Mayor of Mexico City from 1968 to 1976. From 1976 to 1978, Gurría served as Mexico's Permanent Representative to the International Coffee Organization (ICO), based in London.

In the 1980s, Gurría was Mexico's lead negotiator on restructuring its foreign debt.

Gurría served as president and CEO of the Foreign Trade Bank (Bancomext) from 1992 until 1993.

=== Career in Mexican politics ===
Gurría served as the Secretary of Foreign Affairs (1994–1997) in the Ernesto Zedillo administration. In this capacity, he also negotiated the North American Free Trade Agreement (NAFTA) and requested financial aid during the 1994 crisis. Also, he opposed the Helms-Burton Act.

As Secretary of Finance (1998–2000), Gurría oversaw the initial years of Mexico's membership in the OECD and chaired the organization's ministerial council in 1999. Gurría is widely seen as the architect of the Mexican economic stabilization, partially by cutting government spending six times during the Zedillo administration. The effect of his work has been felt during the administration of President Vicente Fox who nominated him to lead the OECD in July 2005.

After leaving government office, Gurría taught International Relations and Financial Economics at the Monterrey Institute of Technology and Higher Education (ITESM). From 2003 to 2005 he chaired the Inter-American Development Bank's External Advisory Group.

=== Secretary-General of OECD ===
In 2005, Gurría emerged at the head of a crowded field of candidates, including former Polish Prime Minister Marek Belka, to succeed Donald Johnston of Canada as the OECD secretary general. In the process, he underwent about 150 interviews in all member countries over the several months to win the backing of governments and OECD officials. During his initial two terms, countries such as Chile, Estonia, and Israel joined the organization. On 26 May 2015, the 34 member countries of the OECD decided to renew Gurría's mandate for the period 2016–2021.

Since 2010, Gurría has also been serving as a Commissioner for the Broadband Commission for Digital Development which leverages broadband technologies as a key enabler for social and economic development. He also belonged to the United Nations Secretary General's Global Advisory Board on Water and Sanitation, chaired by former Prime Minister Ryutaro Hashimoto of Japan.

== Other activities ==
- OECD/UNDP Tax Inspectors Without Borders (TIWB), Co-Chair of the Governing Board (since 2015)
- Bocconi University, Member of the International Advisory Council
- Inter-American Development Bank, Member of the Advisory Board on Financing the Private Sector in Latin America
- Inter-American Dialogue, Member
- Reimagine Europa, Member of the Advisory Board
- World Economic Forum (WEF), Member of the board of trustees
- World Economic Forum (WEF), Member of the Global Agenda Council on Water Security (2012-2014)

== Recognition ==
Gurría is a recipient of many honorary degrees, from the Universidad de Valle de México, Rey Juan Carlos University, European Universities of Leeds, Haifa, and Bratislava.

Gurría has also received several awards and decorations from more than 30 countries, including the titles of Grand officier de la Légion d'honneur and chevalier dans l'ordre du Mérite agricole, awarded by the French Government. He has also received a Medal from the French Senate and the Ridder Grootkruis in de Orde van Orange-Naussau awarded by the Netherlands. Most recently, he was distinguished by the president of Korea with the Gwandwha Medal for Diplomatic Service, and also received recognition to his longstanding contribution to the development of public administration in Mexico, the Medalla al Mérito Administrativo Internacional Gustavo Martínez Cabañas, awarded by the Instituto Nacional de Administración Pública (INAP).

In 2007, Gurría was the first recipient of the Globalist of the Year Award of the Canadian International Council to honour his effort as a global citizen to promote trans-nationalism, inclusiveness and a global consciousness. His awards include the Ben Gurion Leadership Award, the Award Isidro Fabela by the Mexican Association of International Studies, The Nueva Economía Award, the Orden Bernardo O'Higgins en el Grado de Gran Cruz, and the Medalla Rectorial from the University of Chile.

In addition, Gurría has received the following acknowledgments:

- Grand Cross of the Order of Boyaca, 2021 (Colombia)
- Knight Grand Cross of the Order of Orange-Nassau, 2015 (Netherlands)
- Grand Officier de la légion d'honneur (France)
- Chevalier du Mérite Agricole, (France)
- The Order of Diplomatic Service Merit (Gwanghwa Medal - South Korea)
- Medal of the Oriental Republic of Uruguay (Uruguay)

== Personal life ==
Gurría is married to ophthalmologist Lulu Quintana de Gurría, who runs an eye hospital for the poor in Mexico City. They have three children.

== See also ==
- Base erosion and profit shifting

Political offices
Preceded by Manuel Tello Macías	Secretary of Foreign Affairs; 1994–1997	Succeeded by Rosario Green
