= Rodrigo Pérez-Alonso González =

Mexican politician

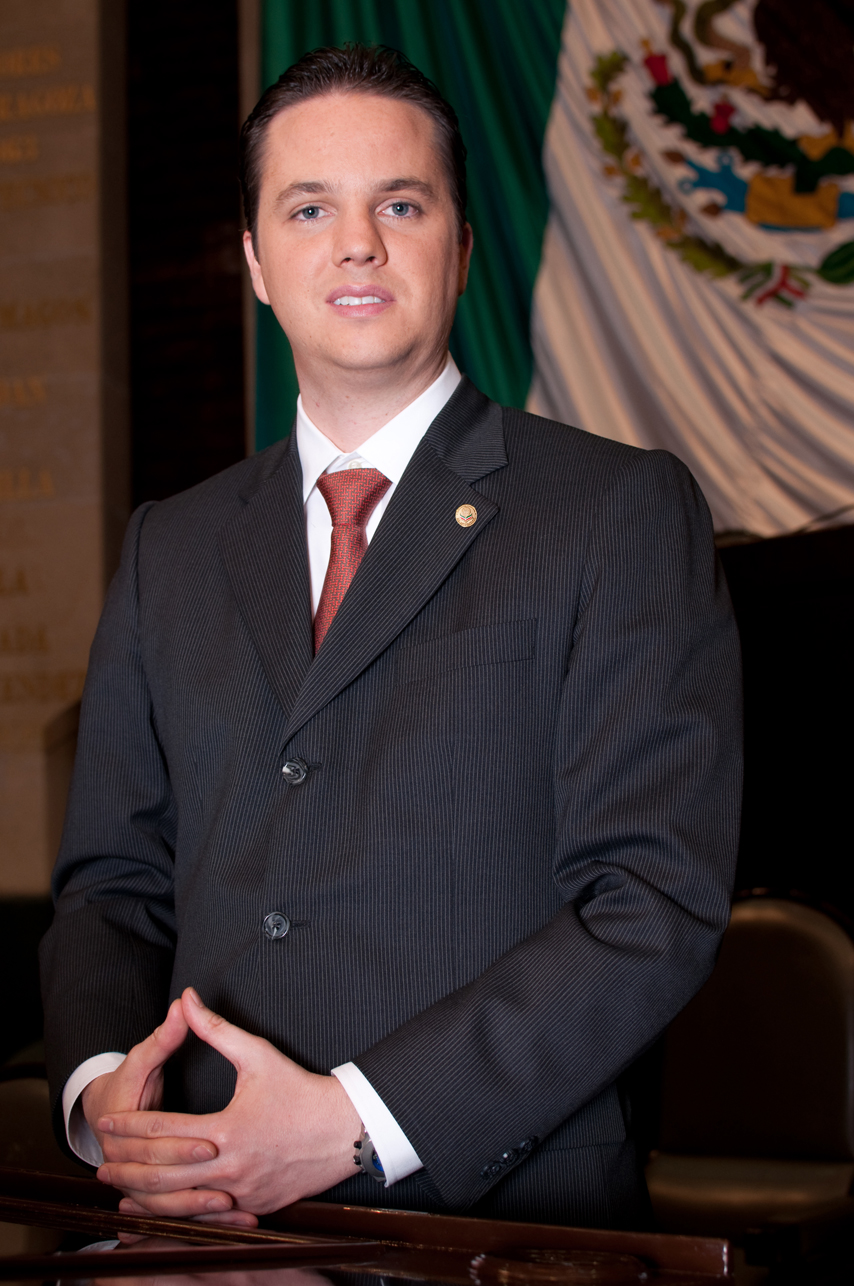
- Born: 3 June 1978 (age 47); Mexico City, Mexico
- Occupation: Politician
- Political party: PVEM

Rodrigo Pérez-Alonso González (born 3 June 1978) is a Mexican lawyer, columnist, academic and politician.

He served as Federal Deputy in the LXI Legislature of the Mexican Congress of the Union; where he chaired the Special Commission for Digital Access. He also served, in the private sector in various roles such as General Director of the National Chamber of Air Transport (CANAERO).

== Biography ==
Rodrigo Pérez-Alonso has a degree in law from the Instituto Tecnológico Autónomo de México (ITAM), a Master's in Public Policy from University College London and a Master in Public Administration from Harvard University. For more than 17 years, Pérez-Alonso has worked in regulatory, legislative, financial, and economic matters within the public and private sectors.

Between 2009 and 2012, Pérez-Alonso served as Federal Deputy for the Green Ecologist Party of Mexico (Spanish: Partido Verde Ecologista de México, PVEM) in the LXI Legislature, where he chaired the Special Commission for Digital Access and served as Secretary in the Economics Commission.

Since 2010 Pérez-Alonso has been writing in the "Opinión" and "Dinero" sections of Excelsior, a Mexican major daily newspaper, and has weekly opinion participations on Imagen Radio, Excelsior TV, and other media outlets. As a lawyer and regulatory expert, he has participated in events organized by the World Economic Forum, Harvard Business Review and others.

In March 2013, Pérez-Alonso was selected as a member of the World Economic Forum's Young Global Leaders.

Until May 2019, he served as General Director of the National Chamber of Air Transport (Spanish: Cámara Nacional de Aerotransportes, CANAERO), an aviation industry trade association. CANAERO represents 67 national, international, and cargo airlines, as well as aviation service providers and private air taxi operators. During his term, Pérez-Alonso added eight new members and he participated in representing the industry for the construction of the Mexico City International Airport (Spanish: Nuevo Aeropuerto Internacional de México, NAIM) and the liberalization of the aviation fuel market in Mexico.

Previously, he served as Director of Financial Planning and Evaluation at Telecomm-Telégrafos, and he was Director of Regulatory Affairs at Televisa Corporación.

Currently, he is a partner in a private consulting firm on public affairs, regulation, economics, and market intelligence in which he provides advice to various companies in matters of technology, energy, aviation, innovation, and telecommunications.

In December 2020 Pérez-Alonso launched a podcast called "Frecuencias".

== Controversies ==
On September 22, 2020, Pérez-Alonso posted on his Twitter account a mockery allusion to Senator Citlalli Hernández's physical appearance.

One day after, the Universidad Iberoamericana decided to terminate Pérez-Alonso's contract as a lecturer in all classes. The university stated that he had made "an offensive and denigrating comment on Senator Citlalli Hernández", something opposed to the university values in the context of fighting gender violence.

Later, Pérez-Alonso offered a public apology to Hernández for these comments.
