= Jaime Serra Puche =

Mexican politician

Jaime José Serra Puche (born January 11, 1951, in Mexico City) is a Mexican economist. He is a partner of the SAI Law and Economics firm in Mexico (sai.com.mx). His professional practice includes the design of investment strategies in Mexico for foreign companies and advice to Mexican companies interested in becoming regional players in North America.

== Early life and education ==
Jaime Serra is the son of Jorge Serra Perayre and Carmen Puche Planes. He received a bachelor's degree in political science and public administration from the National Autonomous University of Mexico, a master's degree in economics from El Colegio de México and a doctorate's degree in economics from Yale University.

== Career ==
He served as Mexico's Undersecretary of Revenue, Secretary of Commerce and Industry in the cabinet of Carlos Salinas de Gortari and as Secretary of Finance and Public Credit in the cabinet of Ernesto Zedillo in 1994. Dr. Serra led the negotiation and implementation of the North American Free Trade Agreement (NAFTA); promoted the conclusion of the Uruguay Round and the creation of the World Trade Organization (WTO); headed the negotiations of free trade agreements with Chile, Colombia, Venezuela, Bolivia and Costa Rica and promoted the creation of the Federal Competition Commission.

He was a trustee of the Yale Corporation and currently co-chairs The President's Council on International Activities of Yale University. He is deputy chairman of the North American Group of the Trilateral Commission and member of The US-Mexico Bilateral Council. He is a director of the following publicly listed companies: Chiquita Brands International (CQB); The Mexico Fund (MXF), Tenaris (TS), Vitro (VTO) and Grupo Modelo (GMODELOC).

He has taught several courses in economics at El Colegio de México (1979–1986) and at Stanford University (1982). From 1986 until 1988 he served as undersecretary of finance in the cabinet of Miguel de la Madrid. He received the National Prize of Social Sciences, Mexico 1986 and National Prize of Economics, Mexico 1979. He has written numerous articles in professional economics journals, many of them jointly with the American macroeconomist Timothy J. Kehoe.

== Other activities ==
- Tenaris, independent member of the board of directors

== Personal life ==
Serra is married to Joanna Wright Abbott.

== Sources ==
- Diccionario biográfico del gobierno mexicano, Ed. Fondo de Cultura Económica, Mexico, 1992.
- SAI Consulting

Preceded by Pedro Aspe Armella	Secretary of Finance; 1994	Succeeded by Guillermo Ortiz Martínez
Preceded by Héctor Hernández Cervantes	Secretary of Commerce; 1988 - 1994	Succeeded by Herminio Blanco Mendoza
