= Guillermo Ortiz Martínez =

Mexican politician

Guillermo Ortiz
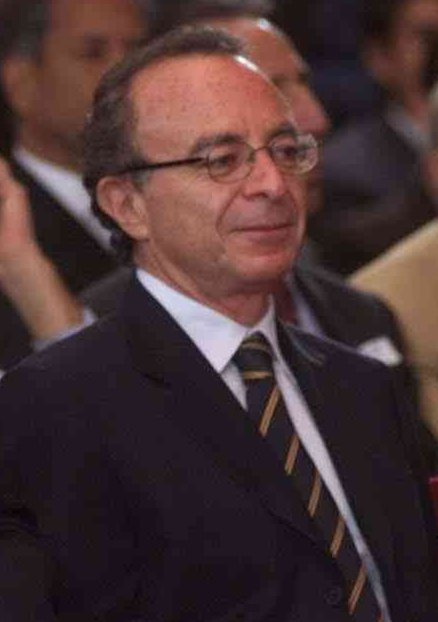

Governor of the Bank of Mexico
- In office January 1, 1998 – December 31, 2009
- Preceded by: Miguel Mancera
- Succeeded by: Agustín Carstens

Secretary of Finance and Public Credit
- In office December 29, 1994 – January 1, 1998
- President: Ernesto Zedillo
- Preceded by: Jaime Serra
- Succeeded by: José Ángel Gurría

Personal details
- Born: 21 July 1948 (age 78) Mexico City
- Party: Independent
- Education: UNAM; Stanford University
- Profession: Economist

Guillermo Ortiz Martínez (born July 21, 1948, in Mexico City) is the son of Gen. Leopoldo Ortiz Sevilla and Graciela Martínez Ostos. He received a B.A. in economics from the National Autonomous University of Mexico and an M.Sc. and Ph.D. in economics from Stanford University in the United States.

He joined the public service in 1971 and has been Mexico's ambassador to the International Monetary Fund (IMF). While at the IMF, he acted as executive director and represented seven countries, including Spain. Martínez served as public finance minister of Mexico from December 1994 to December 1997. He served as Secretary of Finance and Public Credit in Mexico from 1994 to 1998. He served as Secretary of Communications and Transportation in the Mexican Federal Government. He served as deputy public finance minister of Mexico from 1988 to 1994. He served as economist, deputy manager, and manager of Department of Economic Research at Banco de México from 1977 to 1984. He entered public service with the federal government as an economist at the Planning and Budgeting Ministry. He serves as the chairman of Grupo Financiero Banorte SAB de CV. Ortiz Martínez served as the chairman of the board of Bank for International Settlements from March 2009 to December 2009. He has been an independent director of Grupo Comercial Chedraui, S.A.B. DE C.V.; Vitro, S.A.B. de C.V., since 2010 and Weatherford International Ltd. since June 2010. He has been an independent director of Grupo Aeroportuario Del Sureste SA de CV since April 26, 2010. Ortiz Martínez serves as a director at Nacional Financiera SNC Institucion de Banca de Desarrollo. He serves as a director of MEXICHEM and ASUR. He served as executive director of International Monetary Fund (IMF) from 1984 to 1988. He served as director of Banco Nacional de Comercio Exterior SNC. He served as a director of Bank For International Settlements since June 27, 2006. He serves as a director of several international non-profit organizations. He is a professor of Colegio de Mexico, Itam and Stanford. He holds a B.A. in economics from the National Autonomous University of Mexico and both an M.Sc. and a Ph.D. in economics from Stanford University.

When Ernesto Zedillo was sworn as President of Mexico, Ortiz joined the cabinet as Secretary of Communications and Transportation for 28 days. At the midst of the economic crisis of 1994, he was appointed Secretary of Finance and Public Credit and served for three years.

On January 1, 1998, he was appointed governor of the central bank by President Zedillo, substituting Miguel Mancera. In 1999, Ortiz became a member of the influential Washington-based financial advisory body, the Group of Thirty. Later, in 2004, he was reelected governor for six more years by a majority vote in Congress and by the recommendation of president Vicente Fox.

Guillermo Ortiz is married to Margie Simon and has three daughters, María, Sofía, and Lucía.

Political offices
Preceded by Jaime Serra	Secretary of Finance; 1994–1998	Succeeded by José Ángel Gurría
Preceded by Miguel Mancera	Governor of the Bank of Mexico; 1998–2009	Succeeded by Agustín Carstens
