= Aguayo =

Aguayo may refer to:

- Aguayo (cloth), a multicolored woolen cloth, part of the traditional dressing in the Andes region
- People:
  - Agustin Aguayo, American deserter from the Iraq War
  - Albert Aguayo (born 1934), Canadian neurologist
  - Ana Aguayo (born 1993), Mexican flag football and basketball player
  - Isolina Ferré Aguayo (1914–2000), Puerto Rican nun
  - James B. Aguayo-Martel (born 1955) is an American scientist and physician
  - Juan Vicente de Güemes Padilla Horcasitas y Aguayo, 2nd Count of Revillagigedo (1740–1799), Spanish military officer and viceroy of New Spain
  - Luis Aguayo (born 1959), baseball player and coach
  - Luis Alberto Ferré Aguayo (1904–2003), Governor of Puerto Rico
  - Marquis de San Miguel de Aguayo, Mexican governor
  - Miguel Mancera Aguayo (born 1932), Mexican economist
  - Pedro Aguayo (1939–2025), Ecuadorian politician
  - Perro Aguayo (1946–2019), Mexican wrestler
  - Perro Aguayo Jr. (1979–2015), Mexican professional wrestler
  - Raul Aguayo, Dominican Republic sailor
  - Roberto Aguayo, American football placekicker
  - Sergio Aguayo (born 1947), Mexican academic and human rights activist
  - Fábio Aguayo (born 1974), Brazilian political, sector bares and restaurant state of Paraná in Brazil.
