= Pedro Aspe =

Mexican politician

Secretary of Finance and Public Credit
- In office December 1, 1988 – November 30, 1994
- President: Carlos Salinas de Gortari
- Preceded by: Gustavo Petricioli
- Succeeded by: Jaime Serra Puche

Secretary of Programming and Budget
- In office October 5, 1987 – November 30, 1988
- President: Miguel de la Madrid
- Preceded by: Carlos Salinas de Gortari
- Succeeded by: Ernesto Zedillo

Personal details
- Born: Pedro Carlos Aspe Armella; 7 July 1950 (age 76) Mexico City, Mexico
- Party: Revolutionary Institutional Party (PRI)
- Education: ITAM, Massachusetts Institute of Technology
- Profession: Economist

Pedro Carlos Aspe Armella (born on 7 July 1950 in Mexico City, Mexico) is a Mexican economist. He served as secretary of finance (1988 – 1994) in the cabinet of Carlos Salinas de Gortari, where he successfully renegotiated foreign debt, gave autonomy to the central bank and promoted a controversial privatization plan.

Aspe Armella is the son of Pedro Aspe Sais, a lecturer at Escuela Libre de Derecho and former director of El Palacio de Hierro, and Virginia Armella Maza. His great-grandfather was a federal deputy in the early years of the 20th century and his grandfather coordinated the Mexican diplomatic service in the Álvaro Obregón administration.

He undertook his basic studies at private schools managed by the Society of Jesus and received a bachelor's degree in economics from the ITAM and a doctorate in economics from the Massachusetts Institute of Technology. He is also a member of the Institutional Revolutionary Party (PRI) since 1980 and has been awarded the Order of the Phoenix by the government of Greece (1986).

Before joining the cabinet of President Salinas, Aspe Armella chaired the department of economics at the ITAM; served as the founding president of the National Institute of Statistics, Geography and Informatics (INEGI, 1982 – 1985); worked as Undersecretary of Planning (1985 – 1987) and headed the Budget and Planning Secretariat in the cabinet of Miguel de la Madrid.

He has also authored The Analysis of Household Composition and Economics of Scale in Consumption (1976), L'impresa nell economia aperta in presenza di incertezza (1978) and Financial Policies and the World Capital Market: The Problem of Latin American Countries (1983).

Aspe is married to historian Concepción Bernal Verea, a daughter of notable anthropologist and diplomat Ignacio Bernal; and has two daughters and two sons. He is the current CEO of Protego, S.A., a consulting company based in Mexico City with offices in Monterrey, and a member of the board of the American International Group (AIG), McGraw-Hill and its subsidiary Standard & Poor's.

In November 2017 an investigation conducted by the International Consortium of Investigative Journalism cited his name in the list of politicians named in "Paradise Papers" allegations.
