= Rodolfo Corcuera =

Venture capitalist

Rodolfo Corcuera is a Mexican Internet entrepreneur. He is CEO of Higo, a payments platform for businesses in Latin America, which he co-founded with Juan José Fernández and Daniel Tamayo. He also co-founded Tandem, an office management platform, and Aliada, a housekeeping booking service with backing from Mexican investment funds as well as Richard Branson, which was later acquired by their competition Homely.

== Career ==
Corcuera graduated from Instituto Tecnológico Autónomo de México (ITAM) with a law degree. After working as a lawyer for White & Case, Corcuera launched Aliada in 2014, which raised $800,000 in funding. Corcuera and Aliada won "Pitch to Rich México 2016," a contest organized by Virgin Mobile and Laureate Mexico to promote projects of young Mexican entrepreneurs.

In 2020, Corcuera co-founded Higo as an alternative to traditional banking for businesses to pay each other. Higo raised $3.3M from US-based venture funds Homebrew, Susa Ventures and Haystack in March 2021, and then announced a $23M Series A financing round backed by Accel and Tiger Global, just six months after.
