= C. M. Mayo =

American novelist

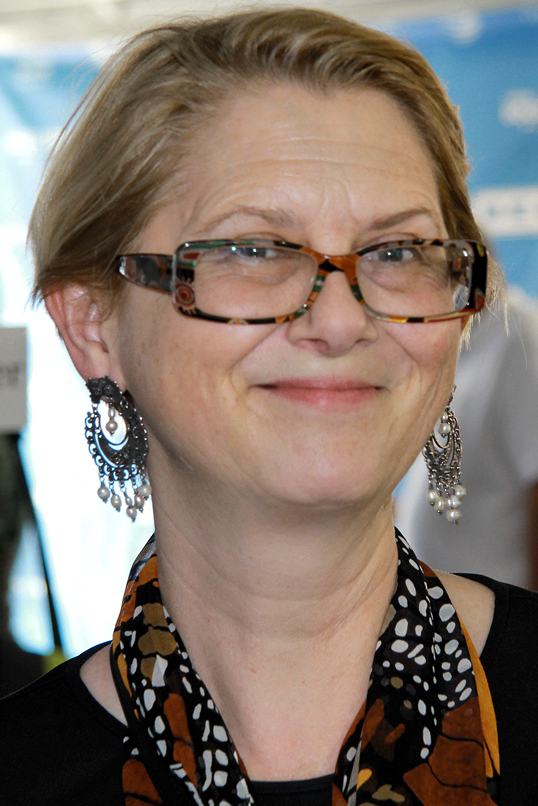
C. M. Mayo at the 2014 Texas Book Festival.

Catherine Mansell, known professionally as C. M. Mayo, is an American literary journalist, novelist, memoirist, short story writer, poet, podcaster and noted literary translator of contemporary Mexican fiction and poetry. For various literary magazines and anthologies, she has translated works by Mexican writers and poets including Araceli Ardón, Agustín Cadena, Antonio Deltoro, Alvaro Énrigue, Eduardo Hurtado, Mónica Lavín, Guadalupe Loaeza, Tedi López Mills, Rose Mary Salum, Ignacio Solares, Juan Villoro, Verónica Volkow, among others. A Texas native, she was raised in Northern California and educated as an economist at the University of Chicago. She is a long-time resident of Mexico City.

== Awards ==
- 1995 Flannery O'Connor Award for Short Fiction, for Sky Over El Nido
- Lowell Thomas Travel Journalism Awards (Three Awards)
- Washington Independent Writers Awards (Three Awards)

== Works ==
- Metaphysical Odyssey into the Mexican Revolution: Francisco I. Madero and His Secret Book, Spiritist Manual (Dancing Chiva, 2014) ISBN 0-9887970-0-3
- The Last Prince of the Mexican Empire. Unbridled Books. 2009. ISBN 978-1-932961-64-5.
- Miraculous Air: Journey of a Thousand Miles through Baja California, the Other Mexico. Milkweed Editions. 2007. ISBN 978-1-57131-304-1.
- Sky Over El Nido. University of Georgia Press. 1999. ISBN 978-0-8203-2119-6.
- "BANK"; "NAFTA"; "THE EGG"; "IN THE NEW TERRITORIES"; "THE SEA IS CORTÉS", The Beltway Poetry Quarterly, Volume 5, Number 4, Fall 2004

=== Translations ===
- Mexico: A Traveler's Literary Companion. Whereabouts Press. March 2006. ISBN 978-1-883513-15-3.
