= Avantel =

Mexican telecommunications company

Avantel was a telecommunications company based in Mexico City.

Avantel was founded in October 1994 by Mexican investors partnered with Banamex and MCI (acquired by Verizon Communications) after the deregulation of the communications industry in Mexico. Avantel initiated operations in August 1996 and Francisco Gil Díaz became CEO in 1997, position he kept in 2000 to join the cabinet of Vicente Fox, president of Mexico as his Secretary of Finance.

Initially a long distance phone company, Avantel has increased it services to provide internet services becoming the first company of its kind in Mexico that built a network exclusively for Internet traffic. The company also offers Voice over IP for residential customers and toll free numbers, voice and data networks for business customers.

On December 4, 2006 Axtel announced the closing of its acquisition of Avantel. The purchase of Avantel consolidates Axtel as the second integrated telecoms company in Mexico.

== See also ==
- Communications in Mexico
