= Miguel Mancera =

Mexican economist (1932–2026)

Miguel Mancera Aguayo (Note: In this Mexican name, the surname is Mancera and the second or maternal family name is Aguayo.) (18 December 1932 – 10 August 2026) was a Mexican economist. He served as general director of the Bank of Mexico, the country's central bank, from 1982 until 1998.

== Early life and career ==
Mancera Aguayo was born in Mexico City on 18 December 1932, to Rafael Mancera Ortiz and María Luisa Aguayo Cendejas. He received a bachelor's degree in economics from the Instituto Tecnológico Autónomo de México (ITAM) and a master's degree in economics from Yale University.

Before joining the public sector, Mancera worked at the Bank of Commerce (nowadays BBVA Bancomer) from 1953 to 1955 and taught several courses at the Escuela Libre de Derecho (1956–1957). He was also a member of the faculty of the ITAM (1958–1965) and the Latin American Center of Monetary Studies (CEMLA) in 1962–1964.

He joined the Bank of Mexico (Banxico) in 1957 and 25 years later was appointed general director by President Miguel de la Madrid. During the 1980s, he faced one of the toughest economic crises in the history of Mexico and in the early 1990s he launched a new national currency, the nuevo peso. In 1994, following a constitutional amendment granting the central bank its autonomy, he became Banxico's first governor. He retired from Banxico and public life in 1998.

== Personal life and death ==
Mancera was married to Sonia Corcuera Corcuera. He received the Order of Rio Branco (Brazil, 1983) and was an officer of the French Légion d'honneur (1990). He died on 10 August 2026, at the age of 93.
