= Bank of Mexico =

Monetary authority of Mexico

Bank of Mexico Banco de México

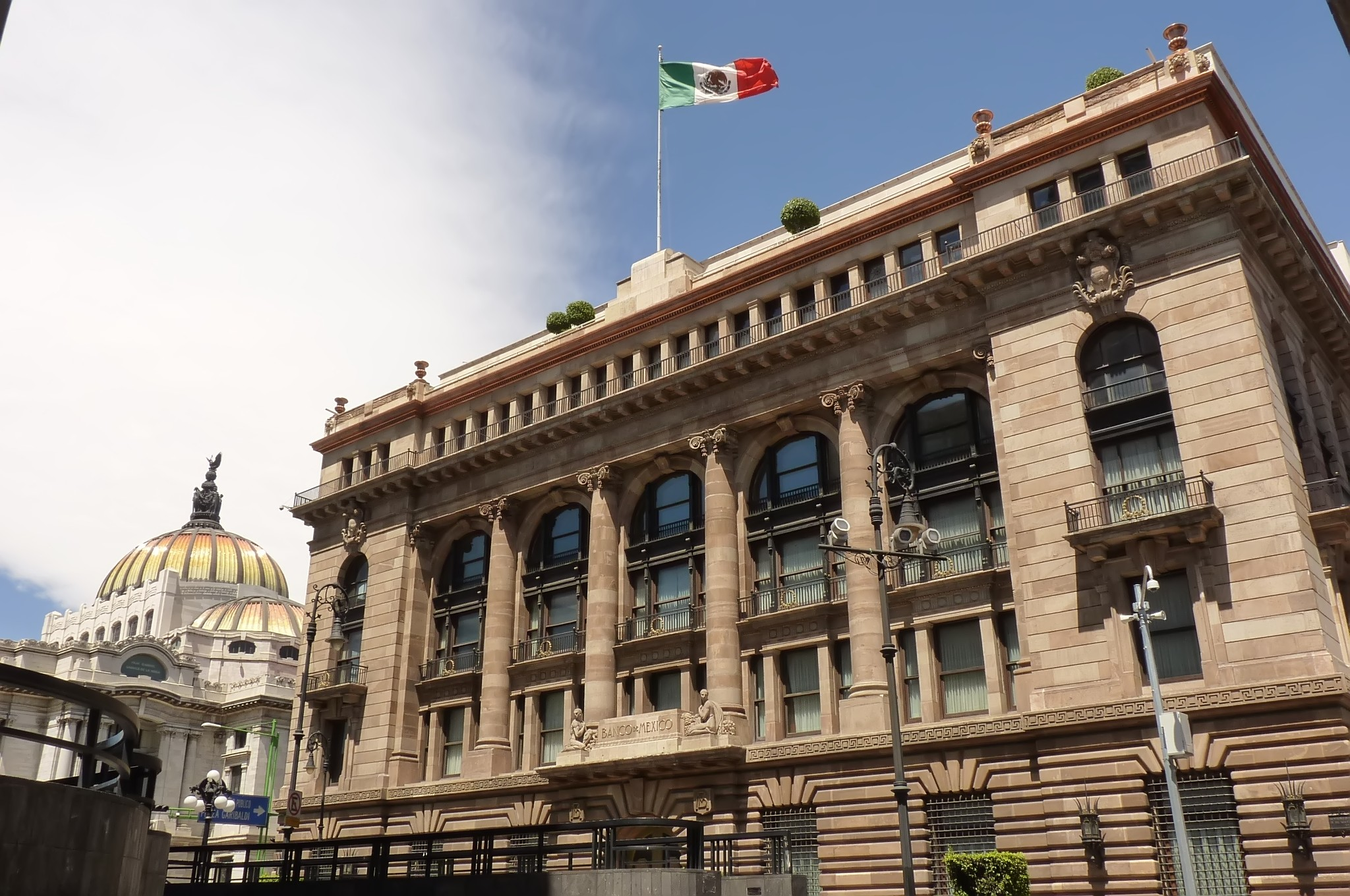
- Central bank of: Mexico
- Headquarters: 2, 5 de Mayo Ave. Alc. Cuauhtémoc, Mexico City
- Coordinates: 19.434893°N 99.140427°W
- Established: September 1, 1925; 101 years ago
- Governor: Victoria Rodríguez Ceja
- Currency: Mexican peso MXN (ISO 4217)
- Reserves: US$225.43 billion
- Interest rate target: 6.50%
- Website: www.banxico.org.mx

The Bank of Mexico (Spanish: Banco de México), abbreviated BdeM or Banxico, is Mexico's central bank, monetary authority and lender of last resort. The Bank of Mexico is autonomous in exercising its functions, and its main objective is to achieve stability in the purchasing power of the national currency.

== Background ==
Plans for a central bank of Mexico began as early as the Mexican Empire of Emperor Agustín de Iturbide with his idea of a Gran Banco del Imperio Mexicano (Grand Bank of the Mexican Empire). This idea was never pursued, instead, credit was generally issued by religious orders or trading guilds. In 1827, Mexico defaulted on a loan from British lenders which made it difficult to find foreign capital and it was forced to rely on local lenders as it had no national bank to lend to it. Instead the government was forced to rely on domestic lenders known as agiotistas (speculators) who specialized in short-term, high-interest loans.

The first formal bank organized by the government was the Banco de Avío which was formed in 1830 during the presidency of Anastasio Bustamante under the direction of the Minister of Interior and Foreign Affairs, Lucas Alamán. The primary purpose of the bank was to stimulate the manufacturing and textile industries. Its success was confined mainly to the latter, but due to ongoing political and military crises the bank was eventually closed in 1842 by President Antonio López de Santa Anna.

The Mexican government had decreed the establishment of a national bank in 1837, which similarly had to close in December, 1841.

=== Private banking ===
The first major private bank in Mexico was opened under the period of the Second Mexican Empire in 1864 when the Banco de Londres, México y Sud America (Bank of London, Mexico and South America) opened in Mexico City.

In the 1870s, the Banco de Santa Eulalia opened in Chihuahua and the Monte de Piedad, which had functioned as a pawnshop since 1775, expanded its services into banking. Both banks issued their own bank notes and many more banks followed suit in the next decade, including the Banco Nacional Mexicano (Mexican National Bank) in 1882, opened by the administration of President Manuel González.

In 1884, the Banco Nacional Mexicano soon merged with Banco Mercantil Mexicano (Mexican Mercantile Bank) to form the Banco Nacional de México (National Bank of Mexico) which issued notes and was the primary lender to the government. The same year government issued a commercial code that gave it control of the banking sector, including the responsibility of chartering banks and establishing minimum levels of capital. The new code also stipulated that all paper money had to be backed by gold or silver on deposit in the national treasury.

The next 15 years were turbulent for the banking sector of Mexico. Due to poor management, the Monte de Piedad temporarily closed, reopening without its banking services. The government mismanaged the emission of a new non-silver coin and was forced to hastily recall it. Both of these events caused the public to lose confidence in the banks and paper money.

=== Porfiriato ===
In 1897, during the presidency of Porfirio Díaz, Finance Minister José Yves Limantour helped to guide the passing of the Ley de Instituciones de Crédito (Law of Credit Institutions). The new law grouped banks into three categories: issuing banks, mortgage loan banks, and auxiliary development banks. Issuing banks were allowed to circulate banknotes within the state they were issued, but only the Banco Nacional de México and the Banco de Londres y Mexico notes were allowed to circulate nationally. They were also authorized to make short-term loans. Mortgage banks were authorized to make loans collateralized by real estate for periods up to 40 years. The auxiliary development banks were authorized to make loans for periods up to two years for the purpose of financing industrial endeavors such as mining, manufacturing, and agriculture. Nationwide, there were 24 banks with issuing authority, two mortgage banks, and five auxiliary development banks.

In 1908, Limantour issued new reforms to protect the Mexican economy from weaknesses exposed by the Panic of 1907. These reforms prevented emissions banks from opening new branches and required them to convert themselves into auxiliary or mortgage banks. These changes had limited success, and though Limantour predicted a budget surplus for 1911, the collapse of the Porfirian regime and the intensification of the Revolution ground normal banking activity to a halt.

=== Revolution ===
In 1911 Francisco I. Madero took power from Díaz. Madero worked to increase the number of banks in the country but he was not trusted by the United States which worked with one of Madero's generals, Victoriano Huerta, to overthrow him in February 1913. When Huerta took power in 1913, he confiscated all of the metal backed banknotes from private issuing banks then issued unbacked banknotes into circulation, crippling the national banking system.

When Huerta was forced from office, the number of banknotes issued multiplied and the population began to lose faith in paper money. As warlords ravaged the country vying for control, they forced banks to make exorbitant loans or they looted them. In 1916 Venustiano Carranza declared that all banks must fully back their banknotes with metal. The 1897 law said that private banks only had to back 33% of the value of their issued notes, consequently all of the private banks were dissolved and their assets seized. That same year Carranza issued his own "unforgeable" notes in May though these lost all value by July of the same year. The banks seized by Carranza weren't returned to their owners until the administration of Álvaro Obregón in 1921.

== Foundation ==
The current constitution of Mexico was signed in 1917. Article 28 of that constitution stipulated that all paper money would be issued by a single bank controlled by the government. But it was not until the end of 1924 that the Ley General de Instituciones de Crédito (General Law of Credit Institutions) was passed which was the legal antecedent for the Banco de México. The law prevented banks from owning stock in other banks and eliminated the stock exemption for banks. Most importantly, the law called for the creation of a central bank.

The Banco de México was created on August 25, 1925, under the direction of Minister of Finance Alberto J. Pani with an official ceremony given on September 1, 1925. It was given exclusive authority to mint coins and print banknotes, a sharp departure from policies of the past. The bank was also given responsibility over exchange rates, interest rates, and monetary regulation. Initially, retail banks even had the option not to partner with Banco de México. The main goals of the Bank at that time were to unify the fractured banking system left behind by the Revolution, create a flexible financial system that could modernize the country, reestablish credit, and renew trust in paper money.

The bank's first years were difficult. Initially only two private banks affiliated themselves with Banco de México, and by 1927, in the midst of the Christero War, the bank exceeded the legal limit of how much it could loan to the government. The unease of the private banking institution was assuaged somewhat when the initial offices of Banco de México were temporarily located in the headquarters of the Banco de Londres y Mexico. The banking interests cemented their relationship with the government by issuing loans to government officials, ensuring that the politicians had a vested interest in the stability of the system.

In 1932, laws were passed that required all private banks to invest their capital in Mexico and associate themselves with Banco de México. The laws also required that Banco de México cease operating as a commercial bank. After passage of this legislation, only three foreign banks remained in the country. These changes and a looser restriction on the issuance of banknotes led to a growing trust in the central bank.

== Directors general (1925–1994) and governors (since 1994) ==
- Alberto Mascareñas Navarro (1925–1932)
- Agustín Rodríguez Cotera (1932–1935)
- Gonzalo Robles Fernández (1935)
- Luis Montes de Oca (1935–1940)
- Eduardo Villaseñor Ángeles (1940–1946)
- Carlos Novoa Rouvignac (1946–1952)
- Rodrigo Gómez Gómez (1952–1970)
- Ernesto Fernández Hurtado (1970–1976)
- Gustavo Romero Kolbeck (1976–1982)
- Carlos Tello Macías (1982)
- Miguel Mancera Aguayo (1982–1997)
- Guillermo Ortiz Martínez (1998–2009)
- Agustín Carstens Carstens (2009–2017)
- Alejandro Díaz de León (2017–2021)
- Victoria Rodríguez Ceja (2022–present)

On 15 December 2009, Agustín Carstens was confirmed by the Senate as the new Governor of the Bank of Mexico with 81 votes in favor and 19 votes against. He assumed office on 1 January 2010.

== See also ==
- Economy of Mexico
- Economic history of Mexico
- List of central banks
- Mexican peso

== Sources ==
- Bancroft, Hubert Howe (1888). History of Mexico. Vol. 6.
