= Alfredo Guati Rojo National Watercolor Museum =

Coordinates: 19°20′55.02″N 99°10′37.51″W

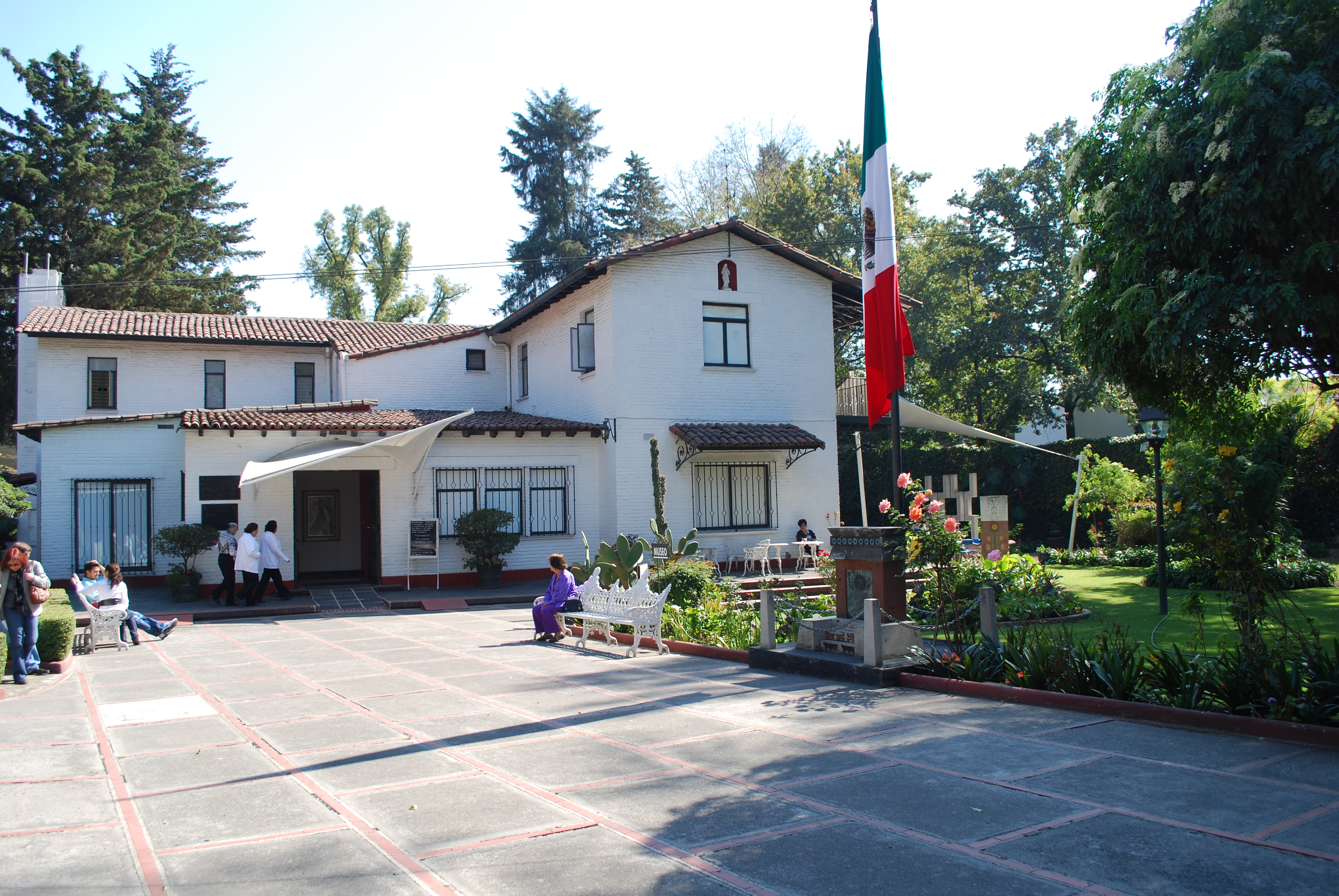
View of the main building on the complex

The Alfredo Guati Rojo National Watercolor Museum (Museo Nacional de Acuarela Alfredo Guati Rojo) was the first museum in the world dedicated specifically to watercolor painting. It is located in the Coyoacán borough of Mexico City, in a former private house which was donated to the museum by the city government. Due to the public health emergency, as of March 2022 the museum was still closed to casual public visits.

The museum was founded and run by artist Alfredo Guati Rojo from its beginnings in 1964 until his death in 2003. It is dedicated to the preservation and continuance of watercolor painting both in Mexico and abroad, with its permanent collection of 300 works donated by Guati Rojo and his wife, classes in watercolor and drawing, its annual Premio Nacional de Acuarela (National Watercolor Prize) and various temporary exhibits both at the museum and abroad.

== History ==
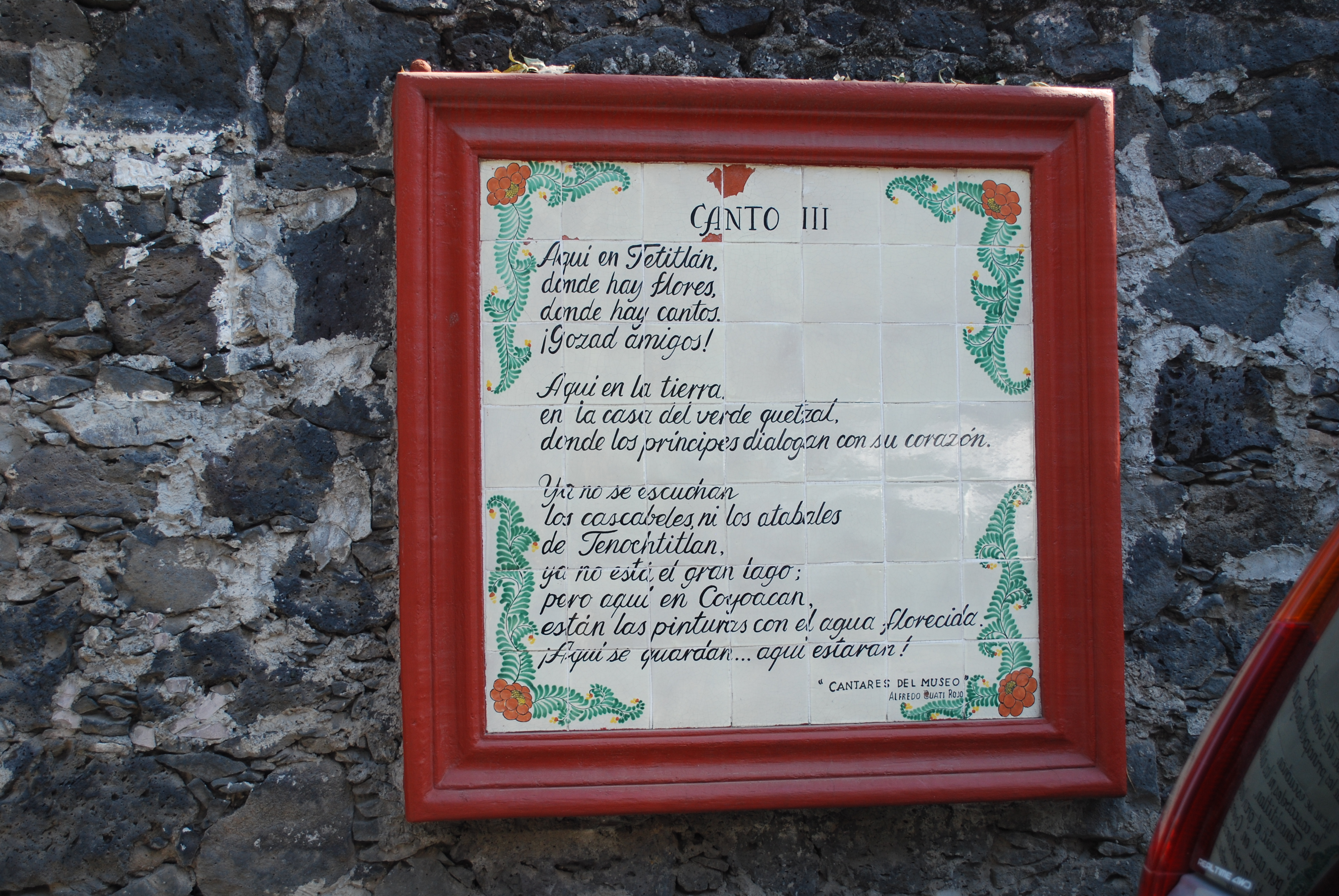
Poem dedicated to the museum on outer wall

The museum and the modern history of watercolor in Mexico is the work of artist Alfredo Guati Rojo. He studied art at the San Carlos Academy in the 1930s, graduating with a master's in 1940. While he studied all aspects of art, he stated that he was always drawn to watercolor painting. After graduation, he decided to teach short courses for those with inclination but not the means for a formal art education. This became an art institute which offered courses in ceramics, fashion design, furniture design, and jewelry making as well as the fine arts. In 1957, it rented a large house in Colonia Roma.

In the 1940s and 1950s, watercolor began to be recognized as a technique with its own particular qualities with artists such as Ricardo Sierra, Carmen Jimenez Labora and Luis G. Serrano dedicated to it. However, many art gallery owners at the time refused to show watercolor works, as it was considered to be a minor art, especially compared to oil painting, as it was associated with lithographs, and small portraits. Guati Rojo established a space in the institute in Colonia Roma dedicated to the showing of watercolors in 1964, called the Salon Anual de Acuarela (Annual Salon of Watercolors). These shows began to attract attention and favorable reviews, and allowed artists to sell paintings. It was renamed the Salon Nacional de Acuarela (National Salon of Watercolors) in 1967 and dedicated itself to the promotion of both Mexican and international watercolor painting.

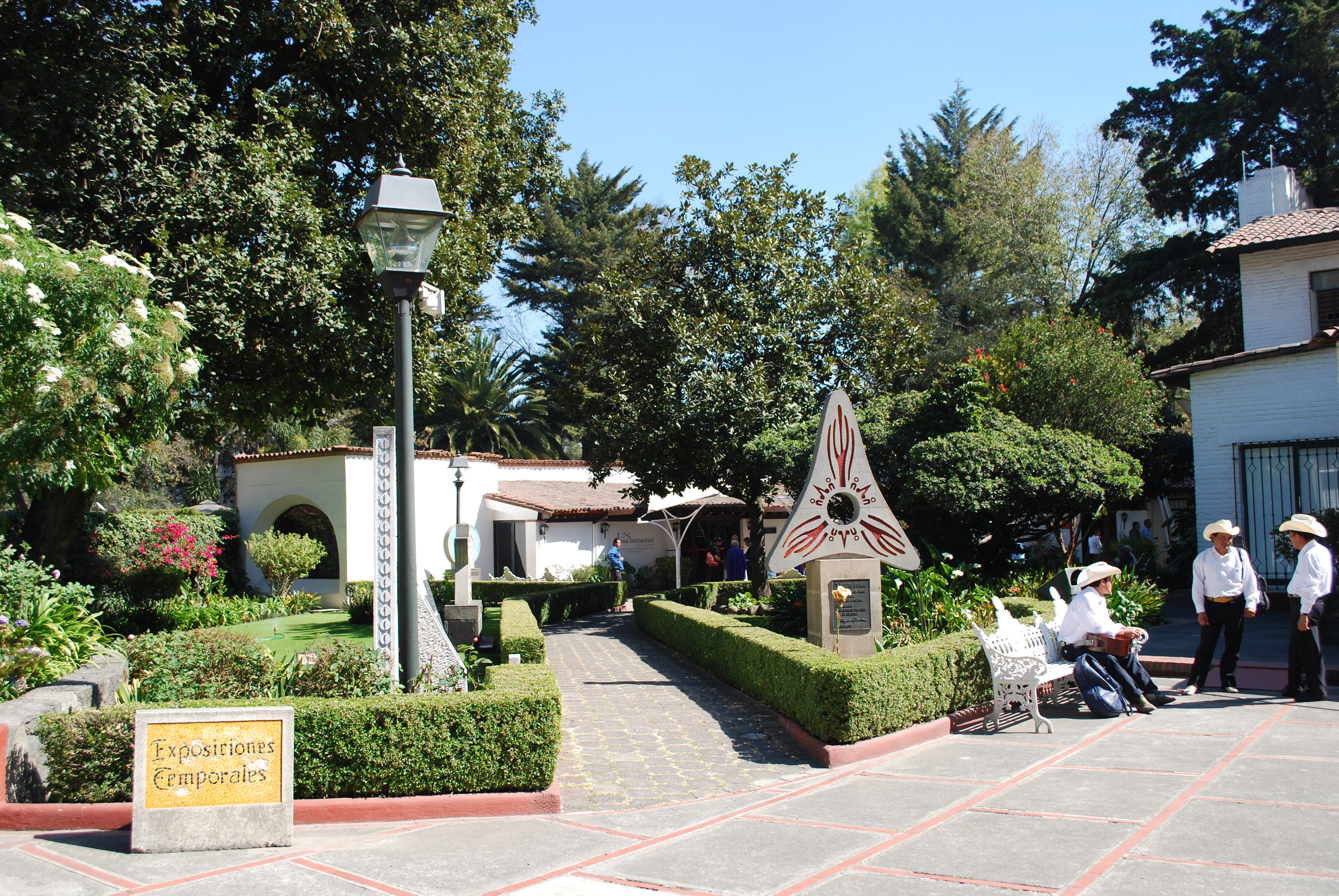
Part of the gardens of the complex

Since graduating from the San Carlos Academy, Guati Rojo and his wife Berta Pietrasanta, collected watercolors and other artworks, starting with Guati Rojo's teachers and companions from the academy and later from his own students and from trips to Europe. By 1977, they had amassed a collection of 300 watercolors, and approached the Secretariat of Public Education with the idea of creating a more formal museum if the agency would provide a site. However, nothing came of this. Soon after, the coupled formed a private society with the aim of founding the museum without government help. This society raised money for two years by presenting shows and concerts. The museum was formally established at the Colonia Roma site, with Guati Roja as first director, but also providing much of the needed money from his own funds, along with the initial 300 pieces. This gave it the name of Museo Nacional de la Acuarela (National Watercolor Museum).

In 1985, the arts institute, along with the watercolor museum, was destroyed by the 1985 Mexico City earthquake. In 1987, the city government bought the house on Salvador Novo Street in Coyoacan, the present site, and donated it to the watercolor museum. However, the government also stated that it could do no more to support the project. The museum continued on private donations and the efforts of Guati Rojo's work. He not only provided much of the funding, but his popularity helped to promote the museum along with Mexican watercolor painting in general.

In 2003, Guati Rojo died, a few weeks after his wife. At the time, he was working on two books, one about the museum and the other an autobiography, both left unfinished. His funeral was held at the museum with his ashes on display under the work called El circo de la vida ("The circus of life"). His death sparked concerns about the future of the museum, along with the legal status of the museum site. However, the museum still remains on the same site.

== Description ==
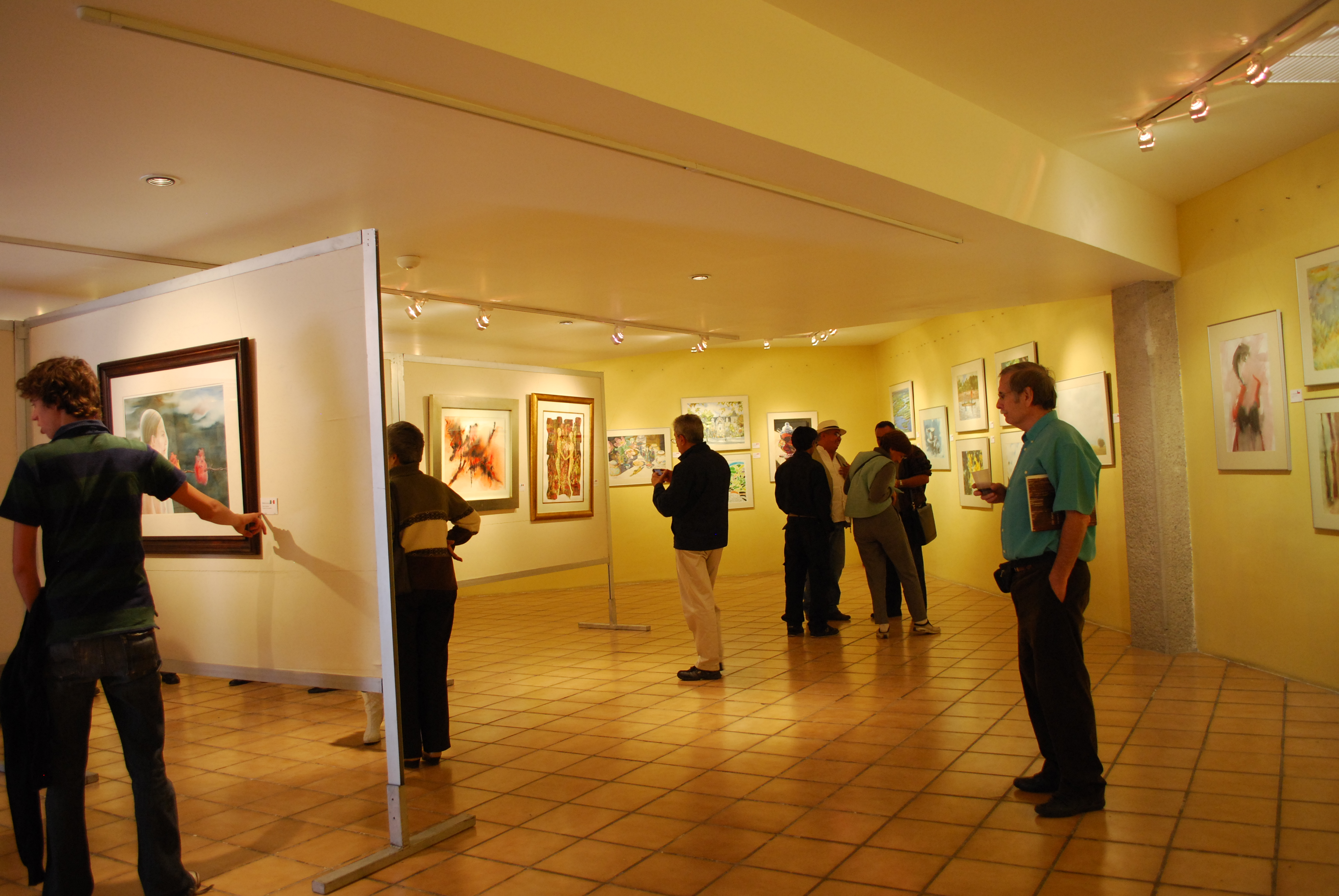
Visitors at the 2010 Benial Internacional de Acuarela at the museum

The museums remains dedicated to the rescue and promotion of watercolor painting in Mexico. Its permanent collection shows examples of the art from the pre-Hispanic period to the present. The museum also offers classes and sponsors shows on site, in other locations in Mexico and abroad. The museum is housed on a property with a formerly private house. The permanent collection is in the main house, which is surrounded by gardens, a temporary exhibit hall, a café, and an auditorium. The gardens are the work of Guati Rojo and his wife over the years. It is filled with flowering shrubs, vines, fountains and several modern sculptures with strong Mexican influence. It includes a poetry garden with a large stone sculpture inscribe with verses by Nezahualcoyotl, as well as some verses by Guati Rojo himself.

The main house is in the center of the property. It contains seven rooms dedicated to the showing of various pieces related to watercolor as well as an intact study. The seven rooms are arranged by chronological order beginning from the pre-Hispanic period until the present day with both Mexican and international watercolor art. The base of this collection are 300 watercolors which were donated by Guati Rojo and his wife when the museum was founded. Although western watercolor painting has its origins in Asia, the pre-Hispanic room is included as many clay vessels were painted with paints made from water and natural pigments. These same paints were used to create codices, which were used into the early colonial period as a form of record keeping. The room after this focuses on 19th-century work, with miniature portraits on ivory and paper, as well as works done by travelers who used the medium to record images of the places they visited. The rest of the space is dedicated to more modern works. In addition to Guati Rojo's own works, which fill two rooms, others include Mujer Indígena by Pastor Velázquez, Amapolas and Bahia de Habana, Cuba by Manuel M. Ituarte, as well as several works by Eduardo Solares and Leandro Izaguirre.

Behind the main house is the Berta Pietrasanta Temporary Exhibition Hall, which holds shows of mostly watercolor works by both Mexican and international artists. Its largest show is the Bienal Internacional de Acuarela (International Biennial of Watercolors), an international exhibition of watercolors held every two years. Other recent shows included a display of 45 lithographs by Honoré Daumier which were donated to the Museo de la Estampa in 1999 and returned for the show. Another show was a collection of winners from a watercolor contest in Michoacán featuring work by Joel Astreo, from Zamora; Nadia Nucico, from Uruapan; Ángel Pahuamba, from the Tarascan Plateau area; Mireya Parra, from Morelia; Judith Lara, from Morelia; Dionicio Pascoe, from Tacámbaro; Mercedes Fernández, from Capula, and Javier López, from Morelia.

As a cultural institution and in conjunction with the Sociedad Mexicana de Acuarelistas, the museum hosts and sponsors, art classes, literary events, talent contests and academic events. The most important of its annual talent events is the Premio Nacional de la Acuarela, which began in 2000. The museum is funded privately, with much of it coming from the Society. For international shows, the Secretariat of Foreign Relations helps with costs such as shipping. International shows have brought the museum renown, as it is the first of its kind in the world.

== Sociedad Mexicana de Acuarelistas ==
Associated with the museum, but legally separate is the Sociedad Mexicana de Acuarelistas (Mexican Society of Watercolor Artists). This society was established in 1964 by Guati Rojo with twelve other original members: Gustavo Alanís, Edgardo Coghlan, Manuel Arrieta, Aguirre Tinoco, Jesús Ochoa, Teresa Miranda, Cristina Romero, Luis Canales, Rodolfo Vankurzyn, Carlos Sommer, Angel Mauro Rodríguez and Joaquín Martínez Navarrete. The society was moved to the Coyoacán site in 1988 and part of its work is to support the museum.

Today, the Society has 83 members, most of whom are in Mexico City. Among them: Sebastián Canovas.

It sponsors watercolor shows both at this museum and in others around the world including INTER ART in Germany, Galería Nacional and the Instituto de México in Bogotá, and in the Contemporary Museum in Saint Petersburg.
