= Sebastián Canovas =

- Born: 8 December 1957 (age 68)
- Notable work: Paintings
- Website: sebastiancanovas.com

Sebastián Canovas Ávalos (born 1957 in Mexico City) is a Mexican artist known for watercolors, oil paintings and murals. He has exhibited throughout Mexico, in the United States, Canada, Switzerland, Germany and France.

== Biography ==
=== Education ===
After attending the Instituto Cumbres (1971–1976), Sebastián Canovas obtained his bachelor's degree in industrial design from Universidad Anahuac in Mexico City.

=== Career ===
Canovas started his career as a furniture designer in his father's family business, Galerías D'Canovas. Some customers, who saw his early work, suggested he become a full-time painter. He then studied watercolor painting under Isabel Leduc. Next was the "Sociedad Mexicana de Acuarelistas" under Guati Rojo, Manuel Arrieta, Roberto Vargas, Demetrio Llordén, Leonard Brooks.

Canovas has worked in various techniques, particularly watercolor. From 2010 through 2012, he has attended the Instituto Allende, under Philip Cusini and the Tamayo Academy in Mexico City.

== Exhibitions ==
Solo Exhibitions
- 1986

Expo arte Universidad Anahuac
Club Cuicacalli, A.C. Edo. de México
Galería Wolmy, S.A.

- 1987

Polyforum Cultural Siqueiros

- 1989

Maximilians, Hotel Crown Plaza. Cd. de México
Galería PEMEX. Cd. de México, Veracruz y Cd. Juárez

- 1994

Los Ángeles, California

- 1996

Galería Beilstein, Alemania
Salon de Pintura Auditorio Nacional México

- 1998

Club Campestre de la Ciudad de México
Galería Inverlat de la Ciudad de México
Club Mundet de la Ciudad de México

- 1999

FitBiz, de la Ciudad de México
Club de Golf Country Club de la Ciudad de Guadajara, Jal.
Galería L'Arrecife en la Ciudad de Manzanillo, Colima

- 2001

Water Color Art Gallery, Florida

- 2002

Club de Golf Valle Escondido, Edo. México

- 2003

Expo Galeria GDC. México

- 2006

Expo Kunsthaus Munich
Expo Galeria Espacio Morges, Suiza

- 2008

Expo Galeria Atelier, San Miguel de Allende, México

- 2009

Expo Galeria Espacio Morges Suiza
Galeria Modern Art Acapulco

- 2010

Galeria Tequis art Tequisquiapan.

- 2011

Mural Hospital Neonatal Guadalupe Victoria

- 2012

Galeria art on 5th Austin TX
Art Concept California

Museum – Institutional Exhibitions
- 2013
- 2012

== See also ==
- List of Mexican artists
