= Felipe Cossío del Pomar =

- Felipe Cossío in his studio in Paris in 1928
- Born: 31 May 1888; Piura, Peru
- Died: 25 June 1981 (aged 93); Lima, Peru
- Occupation: Painter
- Known for: Founder of Instituto Allende

Felipe Cossío del Pomar (31 May 1888 – 25 June 1981) was a Peruvian painter and left-wing political activist. While in exile from Peru he founded an art school in San Miguel de Allende in Mexico in 1938. The school failed, but on his return in 1950 he founded the Instituto Allende, a university-level arts school that was still active in 2014. The short film "Felipe Cossio del Pomar in San Miguel de Allende", by Ezequiel Morones is in Youtube.

== Early years ==
Felipe Cossío del Pomar was born on 31 May 1888 in the Piura city, in the north of Peru. His family was connected to important figures in Peru, including Pío de Tristán, the last Viceroy and later foreign minister of the Peru–Bolivian Confederation. He was also related to Paul Gauguin, the grandson of Flora Tristan. He studied in Lima at the Colegio de Guadalupe, graduating in 1904. He then began the study of Letters at the Universidad de San Marcos. His parents wanted him to become a lawyer. For this reason, in 1906 he sailed to Europe to study Law at the University of Leuven. However, he chose to stay in Brussels and enrolled at the Free University to study fine arts for three years. He then studied and worked as an artist in Paris until the beginning of World War I (1914–18). He became part of the bohemian circle in Paris led by Pablo Picasso, Marc Chagall and Henri Matisse.

Cossío moved to the USA in 1917, where he was much in demand for his talent as a portrait painter in the modernist style. After his return to Peru in 1921 he transferred to the Universidad San Antonio de Abad in Cuzco. It was at this time that he became a friend of Víctor Raúl Haya de la Torre. He obtained a degree of Doctor of Letters in 1922 with a thesis on the history of painting in Cuzco. This was the basis for his book on colonial painting in Cuzco.

Haya de la Torre was deported by the Legufa regime in October 1923. In 1924, the nascent Alianza Popular Revolucionaria Americana (APRA) was forming its first sections in Mexico, Cuba, Panama, Guatemala, Costa Rica, Colombia, Venezuela, Argentina and Uruguay. Cossío had returned to the USA by 1925, where he formed an important base of support for the APRA. Cossio visited Haya de la Torre in Mexico City, and while there met the painter Diego Rivera who introduced him to the forms and colors of traditional Aztec art. In 1927 Cossío del Pomar visited the town of San Miguel de Allende in Mexico and was enchanted by the quality of light. Cossío del Pomar returned to Europe in 1929, where he lived in Brussels, Florence and Paris. In France he worked with the surrealists André Breton and Louis Aragon.

In 1931 Cossío was back in Peru helping to organize the APRA. Cossío used his reputation to push for improvements in the teaching of art, both to modernize the teaching and to upgrade it to a graduate level where before it had simply been considered a minor trade. In the second half of 1932 Haya de la Torre was imprisoned and threatened with the death penalty. Cossío del Pomar moved to Buenos Aires and Santiago de Chile. In 1935 Cossío was placed on a blacklist, threatened with immediate arrest if he returned to Peru, and the sale of his books was banned.

== Mexico ==
In 1937 Cossío del Pomar returned to Mexico. He founded the Escuela Universitaria de Bellas Artes (University School of Fine arts) in San Miguel de Allende in a former convent that had been used as a barracks. With the support of president Lázaro Cárdenas the government transferred the property to the school, which opened in 1938. The American artist and writer Stirling Dickinson was made director of artistic studies. The influx of students brought new prosperity to the town. Cossío del Pomar returned to Peru in 1945 when the government granted amnesty to exiles. He sold his holdings, which included a ranch as well as the school, to the Mexico City lawyer Alfredo Campanella.

Cossío returned to San Miguel de Allende in 1950, discovered the earlier school had been ruined by Campanella, and founded a new school with the help of the former governor of Guanajuato Enrique Fernández Martínez, and Fernández's wife Nell Harris. Cossio and Fernández bought the ruined 18th century Renaissance palace that the Count of Canal had built during the silver boom, with its large grounds. They renovated the building, and also opened several cottages and a hotel for visitors. Stirling Dickinson became art director of the newly opened Instituto Allende.

== Later years ==
Cossío remained in Mexico until 1954, then moved to Madrid. He lived there until 1959, when he moved to Havana after the success of the Cuban Revolution. He disagreed with the ideological direction of the revolution, and in 1961 moved back to Spain to Gandia, Valencia, in the southeast. This was Cossío's most prolific period, both as an artist and an author. He returned to live in Peru in 1980, aged 92, and died the following year. Although he died in Lima, he had arranged for his remains to be buried in the city of Piura. He left the city his private art collection with the purpose of erecting the Museum of Art of that city.

== Publications ==
Cossío del Pomar was a writer as well as a painter, and the author of a number of literary works. These include:

- Pintura colonial (Colonial Painting) 1930, which discusses painting in Cuzco and is enthusiastic about the art of the Indians and mestizos
- Arte y vida de Paul Gauguin (Art and Life of Paul Gauguin), 1929
- El indoamericano (The American Indian), 1942, political biography of Víctor Raúl Haya de la Torre
- Arte del Perú pre-Colombino (Art of pre-Columbian Peru), 1949
- Cuzco Imperial (Imperial Cuzco), 1952
- Arte del Perú Colonial (Art of Colonial Peru), 1958

== Sources ==
- Haya de la Torre, Víctor Raúl; Cossío, Felipe; Alva Castro, Luis (2010). "El aprismo es un acierto y una profecía": correspondencia Víctor Raúl Haya de la Torre-Felipe Cossío del Pomar, 1948–1975. Instituto Víctor Raúl Haya de la Torre. OCLC 753827309.
- "Historia" (in Spanish). Instituto Allende. Archived from the original on 28 July 2014.
- Jiménez, Flor (12 October 2011). "Cossío del Pomar: ¿Que significa el arte para un artista?" (in Spanish).
- Valle Riestra, Javier (26 November 2013). "Felipe Cossío del Pomar". La Razón. Archived from the original on 28 March 2014.
- Virtue, John (25 October 2001). Leonard and Reva Brooks: Artists in Exile in San Miguel de Allende. McGill-Queen's Press – MQUP. ISBN 978-0-7735-2298-5.
