= Instituto Allende =

Visual arts school in Mexico

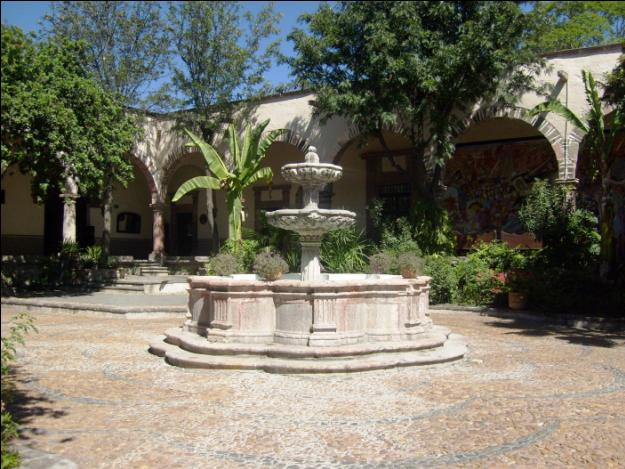
- Type: Arts college
- Established: 1950
- Location: San Miguel de Allende, Guanajuato, Mexico; 20.909199°N 100.746968°W
- Website: instituto-allende.edu.mx

The Instituto Allende is a visual arts school in San Miguel de Allende, Mexico. The institute provides a range of courses, and offers a BA in Visual Arts and an MA in Fine arts in association with the Universidad de Guanajuato. Its courses and degrees are recognized by most North American universities. It has been popular with American and Canadian students and artists since it opened in 1950, and the town now has a large expatriate community from the United States and Canada.

== Location ==
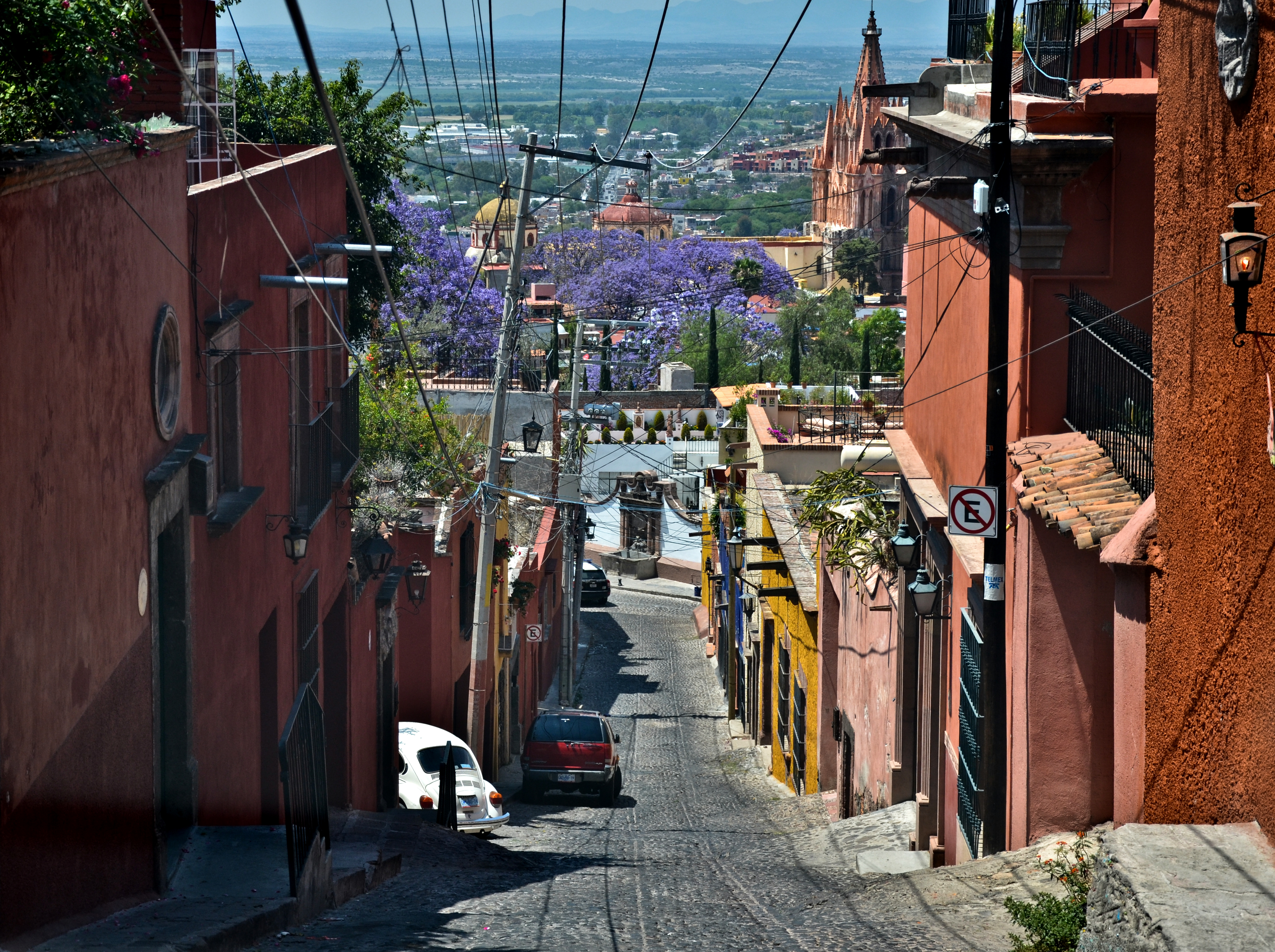
View of the town

The town of San Miguel de Allende is about four hours drive north of Mexico City. It is named after General Ignacio Allende, a hero of the Mexican War of Independence. It is at altitude of 6,200 feet (1,900 m) and has a temperate climate. The town was founded in 1542. It was flourishing by the 17th century, but in the late 18th century suffered from a severe economic crisis. The wealthy inhabitants moved elsewhere, and the town stagnated. The institute brought new life to the town, which is now relatively prosperous. San Miguel has cobblestone streets and old stone buildings, and has been designated a national historical monument.

The institute is a few blocks southwest of the town center. It is housed in a massive building that was originally erected as a country residence for the wealthy Canal family. The family of the Conde de Canal began building on the site in 1735. In 1809 it was sold to the Discalced Carmelite sisters. They may have had the tunnel built that once connected it to the Parroquia. The art college occupies the rear of the complex and its gardens. The front has a commercial plaza with a café and several galleries. The Galería Pérgola, opened in 1951 as an exhibition space for the Institute, has a large collection of works by Mexican artists in different styles and media. The Feria de Lana y Latón, a large crafts fair with vendors from across the country, is held every few months in the central plaza of the Institute.

== Background ==
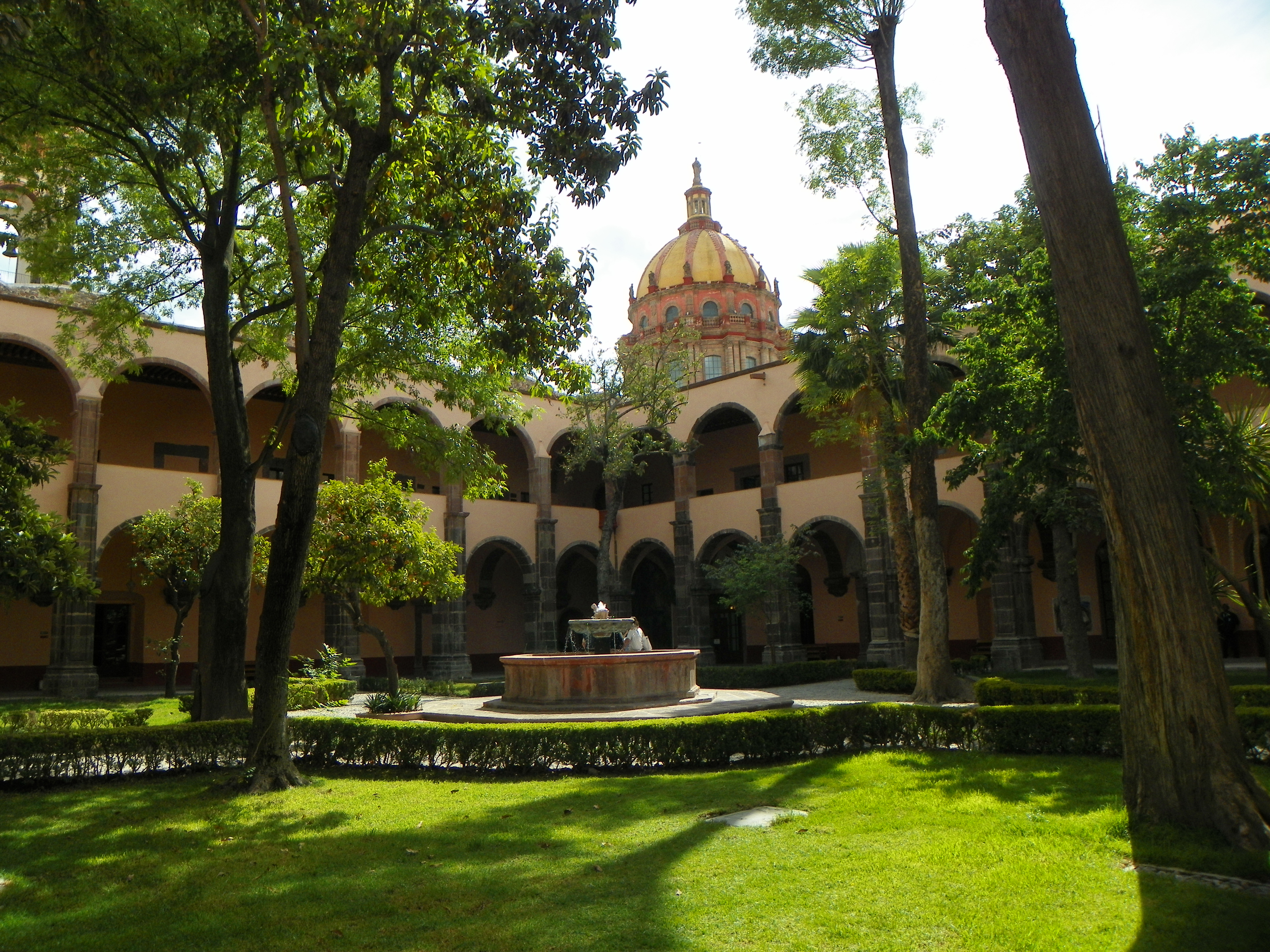
Convento de Nuestra Señora de la Concepción, home of the Escuela Universitaria de Bellas Artes

In 1927 the Peruvian diplomat and artist Felipe Cossío del Pomar visited the town and was enchanted by the quality of light. More than ten years later he founded the Escuela Universitaria de Bellas Artes (University School of Fine arts) in a former convent that had been used as a barracks. The influx of students brought new prosperity to the town. Cossío del Pomar returned to Peru when the Peruvian government granted amnesty to exiles. He sold his holdings, which included a ranch as well as the school, to the Mexico City lawyer Alfredo Campanella.

When World War II ended in 1945, the G.I. Bill provided free education for veterans. Campanella saw an opportunity to make money when the school was approved for GI students. Stirling Dickinson, an artist in charge of promoting the school, was persuaded to over-state the quality of the teaching. Many took the opportunity to study art in San Miguel, where the cost of living was very low.

The school had hired the muralist David Alfaro Siqueiros as a lecturer, a noted communist. He had a dispute over funding with Campanella. Most of the students supported Siqueiros, and in the end most of them walked out. The school was forced to close in 1949. The former convent of the Immaculate Conception is now home to the government-run Centro Cultural Ignacio Ramírez.

== History ==
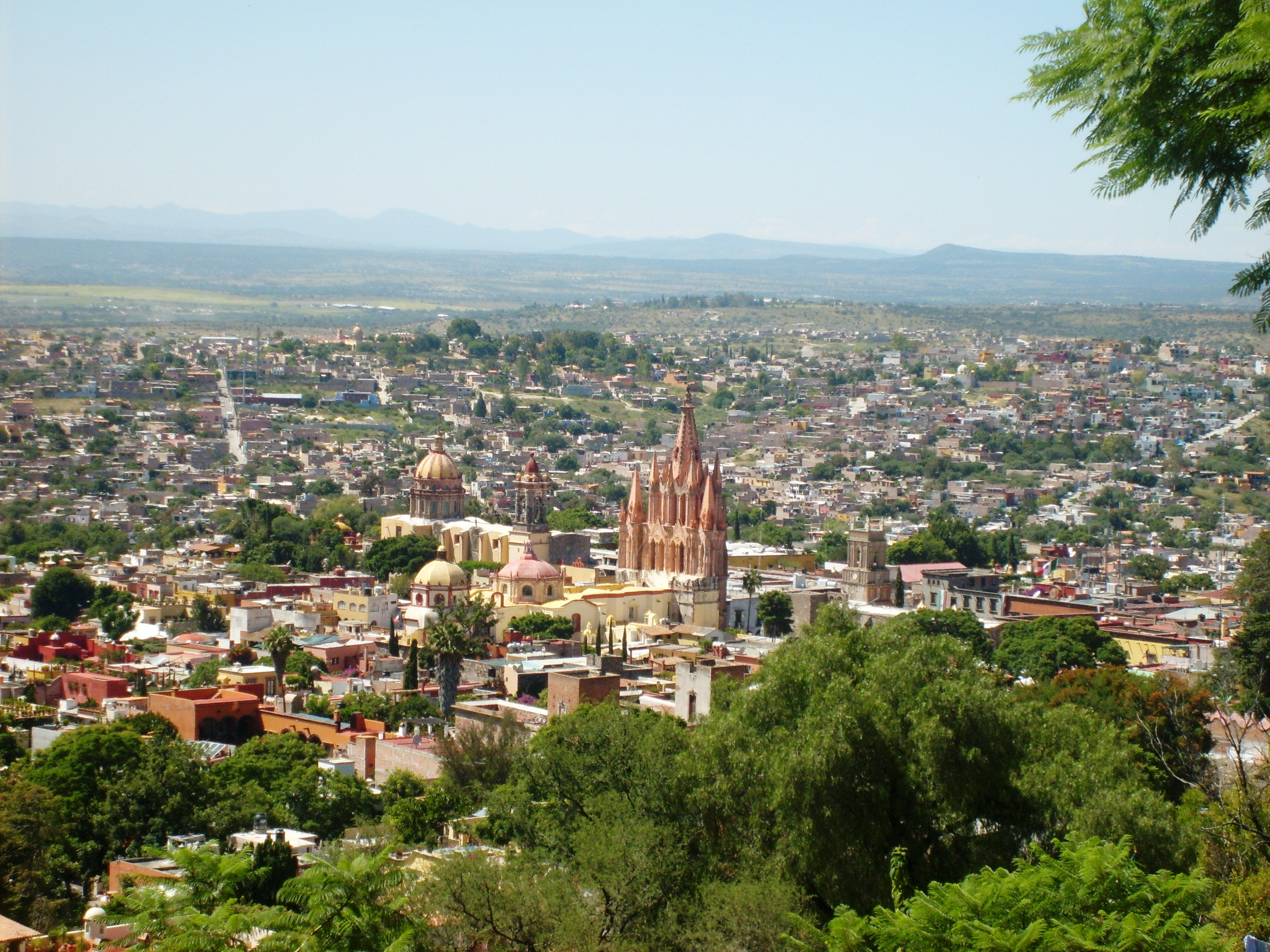
View of the town center

Cossío returned, discovered the earlier school had been ruined, and founded a new school with the help of the former governor of Guanajuato Enrique Fernández Martínez, and Fernández's wife Nell Harris. Cossio and Fernández bought the ruined 18th century Renaissance palace that the Count of Canal had built during the silver boom, with its large grounds. They renovated the building, and also opened several cottages and a hotel for visitors. In September-October 1950, before the official opening, the Institute gave an exhibition of the work of local artists. The painter Frank Leonard Brooks and his wife, the photographer Reva Brooks, were both included in this show.

Stirling Dickinson left a school he had opened in the town and became art director of the newly opened Instituto Allende. The Instituto Allende was able to grant a Master of Arts degree from its beginning by arrangement with the Universidad de Guanajuato. It was therefore recognized by several universities in the United States, which attracted students since they could earn credits in Mexico. The Italian-American painter Rico Lebrun was brought to the school as a star teacher. By 1960 the expanded institute began to offer undergraduate courses. North Americans who had studied in the Institute often returned to live in San Miguel, making the town increasingly prosperous.

During the period from the 1950s to the 1970s the Instituto Allende attracted hundreds of students from the United States. Beat Generation writers including Jack Kerouac and Neal Cassady spent time in the town. The New York Herald Tribune published an article that praised the institute, the low cost of living and the diversity of the students, making a point of saying "there is nothing Bohemian about the Instituto's group." Dickinson continued to work at the Instituto Allende until retiring in 1983. By 2010 almost one tenth of the population of San Miguel, or 8,000 people, came from the United States.

== Program ==
The Instituto Allende is an independent, private, non-profit organization. The faculty and office staff all speak both English and Spanish. Students may take Spanish language classes. Practical courses are given in painting, drawing, sculpture, ceramics, weaving, jewelry, photography, batik, lithography, paper making, etching, monotype printing, and silkscreen. The institute also gives classes on the history of art. Students may earn a Bachelor's degree in Visual Arts and a Master's degree in Fine arts, both recognized by many universities in North America. In 2012 the Lifelong Learning program was established to offer courses in English to visitors and locals.

== Notable alumni ==
- Lowry Burgess
- Amanda Crowe (1928–2004)
- Nicolás Cuéllar (1927–2010)
- Demi (born 1942)
- Stirling Dickinson (1909–1998)
- Margaret Webb Dreyer (1911–1976)
- Joseph Glasco (1925–1996)
- Gorky González Quiñones (born 1939)
- Luis Gutierrez (born 1933)
- Elaine Hamilton-O'Neal (1920–2010)
- Ralf Henricksen (1907–1975)
- Joseph F. Hlavacek (1921–1982)
- Roy Kiyooka (1926–1994)
- William Kurelek (1927–1977)
- Joy Laville (born 1923)
- Don Mabie (born 1947)
- Wynona Mulcaster (1915-2016)
- Joyce J. Scott (born 1948)
- Jolie Stahl (born 1950)
- Romeo Villalva Tabuena (born 1921)
- Spider Webb (1944–2022)
- Phyllis Wiener (1921–2013)
- Sebastián Canovas (born 1957)
