= Tabuena =

Tabuena is a surname. Notable people with the surname include:

- Miguel Tabuena (born 1994), Filipino golfer
- Romeo Tabuena (1921-2015), Filipino painter and printmaker
