= Alfredo Guati Rojo =

Mexican artist (1918–2003)

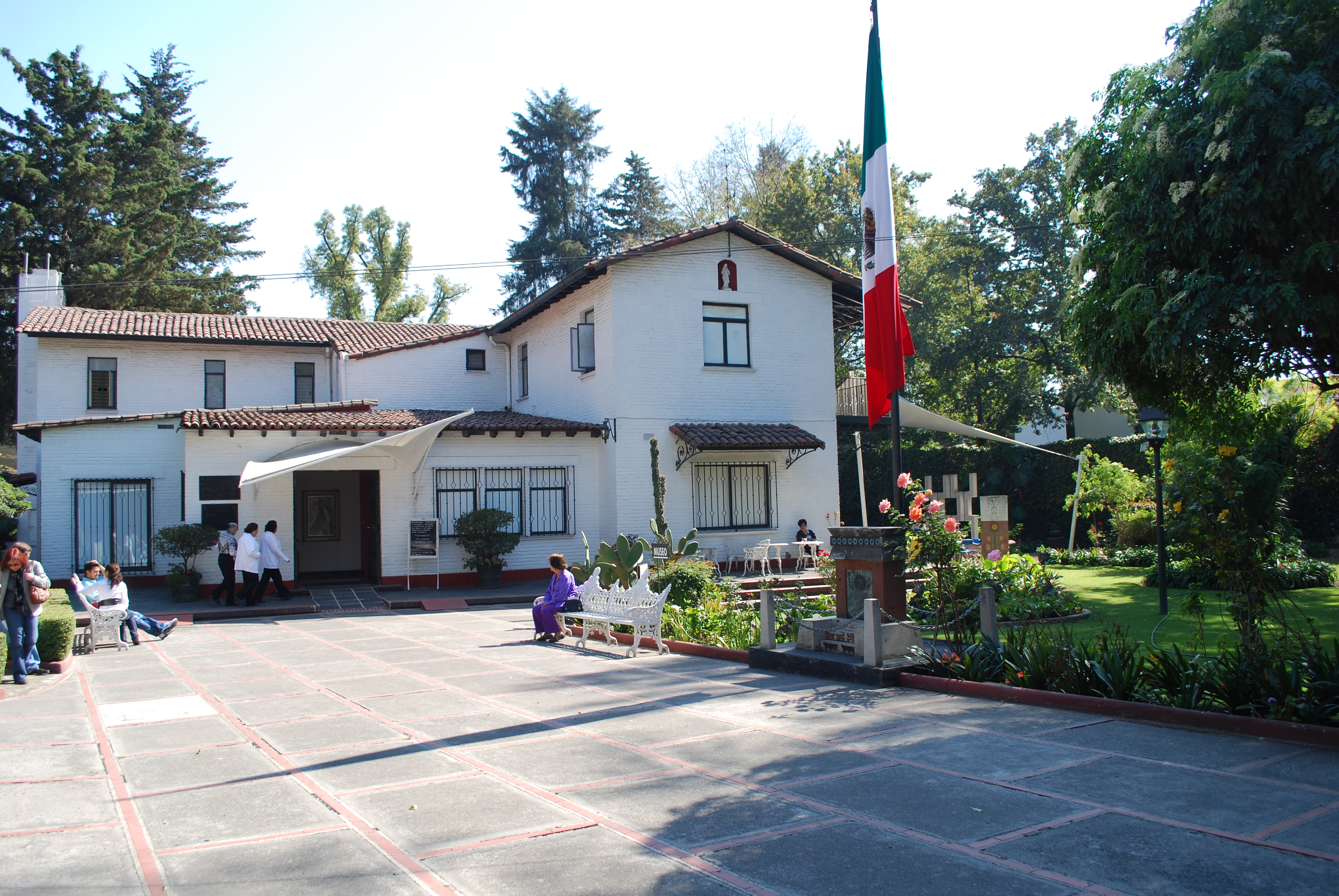
View of the National Watercolor Museum of Mexico, founded by Guati Rojo

Alfredo Guati Rojo Cárdenas (December 1, 1918 – June 10, 2003) was a 20th-century Mexican artist who worked to restore the reputation of watercolor painting as a true art form. His preference for the technique came from seeing Diego Rivera’s work and helping with a fresco mural in his hometown of Cuernavaca as a child. When he was 16, he went to Mexico City to study law, but switched to art. He learned the various classic art techniques but kept his preference for watercolor. His career began by teaching art, founding an art institute in the Colonia Roma section of Mexico City. In the 1950s, he tried to get the area's art galleries to show watercolors but they refused, considering it to be a minor art form. He began to host exhibitions of watercolor works at his art institute with success which led to the formation of the Museo Nacional de la Acuarela or National Watercolor Museum in the 1960s. The museum remained in Colonia Roma until the 1985 Mexico City earthquake destroyed the building and led to its relocation to the Coyoacán borough, where it remains. During this time, Guati Rojo also had a career showing and selling his own artwork, almost exclusively watercolors, in various parts of the world. Most of his income from this painting went to support the museum.

== Life ==
Alfredo Guati Rojo Cárdenas was born on December 1, 1918, in Cuernavaca as the only child of María de Jesús Cárdenas and José Guati Rojo Ramírez. He spent his childhood listening to the stories of his paternal grandfather and traveling much of Mexico as his father was a criminal lawyer.

He began drawing and painting images from his hometown of Cuernavaca when he was in primary school at about age seven. However he believed that it was seeing the murals of Diego Rivera on the wall of the Palace of Cortes that inspired him to be an artist. He had a primary school art teacher, Luis Betanzos, who recognized the boy's talent. Betanzos was also associated with Eduardo Solares of the Academy of San Carlos. When Solares came to Cuernavaca to paint a new fresco, Guati Rojo was selected to be an assistant. This gave him his first experience in water-based paint.

At age 16, he left Cuernavaca for Mexico City to study at the Escuela Nacional Preparatoria, living at his grandfather's house. He then enrolled into law school as his father wanted to continue the family tradition. However, he soon decided that he did not like law and wanted to transfer to the Escuela Nacional de Artes Plásticas . Despite strong opposition from his father, his mother was supportive and he made the switch. He progressed rapidly and began working at an assistant to his teachers. These earnings allowed him to buy watercolor supplies. Many of these early small paintings are part of the museum's permanent collection. He graduated in 1940, and although trained in various techniques, he kept his preference for watercolor painting.

That same year, he was awarded the “Águila Azteca” (Aztec Eagle) for his cultural work in Central and South America along with Ignacio Beteta . He also married Berta Pietrasanta, the sister of one of his art school classmates, Orlando Pietrasanta. The marriage lasted sixty four years, with her working with him on projects, most notably the running and promotion of the National Watercolor Museum after it was founded. They never had children, but the couple considered the museum as such. In 1995, they wrote a “Carta a mi hijo el Museo” (Letter to my child, the Museum) as testimony. Berta died in May 2003. This along with impending blindness due to disease made Guati Rojo depress and he died only a few weeks later on June 10, 2003.

== Career ==
Guati Rojo's career began teaching art, starting from 1937 and teaching more or less full-time in various public and private schools until 1969. In 1954 he founded the Instituto de Arte de México in Colonia Roma. This institute offered shorter courses in the fine arts then traditional institutions and offered classes in ceramics, fashion design and jewelry making as well. The institute was located on the ground floor of the house he and his wife lived in. Here he gave classes and occasionally hosted cultural events.

Guati Rojo was one of the first promoters of watercolors in Mexico. In the 1950s, he tried to get watercolors shown at galleries in Colonia Roma but could not because water color was considered only a “minor art.” So his Institute became the first place in Mexico City to exhibit watercolors as a serious art form. The shows at the institute began to have success and favorable reviews, leading watercolor artists in the city to sell their work. In 1955, part of the institute became the site of the first Salón Nacional de Acuarela (National Exhibition of Watercolors), an annual event which continues to the present. At first Guati Rojo was the judge of the works and bought many of the winning pieces.

About a decade later, he founded the Sociedad Mexicana de Acuarelistas in 1964 along with Gustavo Alanís, Edgardo Coghlan, Manual Arrieta, Jesús Ochoa and Teresa Miranda. He remained the organization's president until his death in 2003. From the time he graduated from college, he had gathered a large collection of watercolors, starting with those of her former teachers and his past and present students. This collection became the base of Museo Nacional de la Acuarela or National Watercolor Museum, the first of its kind in the world in 1967.

Guati Rojo and the Sociedad tried to get the government to fund a museum site but without luck. Guati Rojo founded another group, the Amigos del Museo de Acuarela (Friends of the Watercolor Museum) with the aim of operating the museum independently at the house in Colonia Roma, spending two years presenting shows and concerts to raise money. During this time, from the 1960s and 1970s, he also worked at the head of Diffusion Cultural of the Desarrollo Integral de la Familia agency and in 1971 he became the head of the Departamento de Artes Plásticos at the Instituto Nacional de Bellas Artes.

The watercolor museum continued to operate in the building in Colonia Roma until the 1985 Mexico City earthquake destroyed it. However, the loss of the building prompted the government to purchase the museum's current site at Salvador Novo 88 in the Coyoacán borough, an expensive section of the city. After this, the government said it would do no more. From 1985 until his death, he and his wife renovated the large house, with the gardens around the main house designed by the two, which includes a “poetic space” dedicated to the indigenous poet-king Nezahualcoyotl. In addition to its exhibition of its permanent collection and temporary shows, the museum arranges shows of Mexican watercolors all over the world. This has helped Mexican artists and given the institution renown. The museum is the first of its kind in the world, and is partly responsible for the re acceptance of watercolor as a serious art form. Guati Rojo founded the Bienal de la Acuarela (Watercolor Biennal) at the museum in 1992.

His work founding the museum was accompanies by a long career of producing artworks, almost exclusively watercolors. His first exhibit was in 1947, and since then his work was shown individually and collectively in many countries of the world including Austria, Belgium, Spain, Italy, France, Great Britain, Japan, the United States, New Zealand, Indonesia, Brazil, Singapore, Colombia, Canada and Venezuela as well as in many parts of Mexico. His works are found in museum collections in many parts of the world, including the Tel Aviv Museum of Art in Israel, the Urawa-Saitama Museum in Japan, Boliviano de Arte Contemporáneo in Colombia, and Asociación Italiana de Acuarelistas de Milan in Italy as well as his National Watercolor Museum in Mexico. Near the end of his life, he was famous enough to sell painting just by announcing its start and not even showing it to the buyer. Much of the income from his own work went to supporting the museum.

Shortly before his death, he lost most his sight. His last painting called Desde las sombras (From the shadows) (2003), was done while he was nearly blind. It was painted in as an abstract, printing in black using his hands.

Over his career, Guati Rojo received recognition as a member of the Legión de Honor Nacional, the Salón de la Plástica Mexicana, the Royal Society of Arts of England, Agrupación de Acuarelistas de Cataluña, International Association of Fine Arts of UNESCO, Canadian Society of Painters in Water Colour and the American Watercolor Society .

== Artistry ==
He was considered one of the best watercolor artists and art promoters of Mexico in the 20th century. His main focus in life was to restore watercolor's reputation as a true art form. At the time, watercolor was relegated as a minor art, associated with old women, hobbyists and England of the 19th century. It fell out of favor in the 19th century with the advent of lithographic portraits and landscapes. Large oil paintings came to be seen as the only true art, with the small size of watercolor and their transparency thought of as insignificant. One of his defenses of the art is that fresco is really watercolor, over plaster instead of paper, using the fresco murals of Diego Rivera as examples. He also claimed that the British did not invent it as water based pigments have been used from prehistoric times. Guati Rojo also considered watercolor essential to Aztec civilization as the codices were written with water-based paints on amate paper.

Unlike most watercolor artists, who paint on surfaces which are horizontal to keep the paint from running, Guati Rojo painted on vertical surfaces. He defied the effect of gravity by painting thin strokes also giving the images more exactness. He is quoted as saying "Water, for me, has always had its mystery. Watercolors do what they want to do. You can´t change them for anything… No one can really say they have dominated the technique. Every time I start a new painting I am terrified that I will fail." Although he did not do self-portraits, he included his likeness in some of his works. One of these is Salome (1984) where the face of John the Baptist is that to the artist with a beard. In another one of his works El Circo de la Vida ("The Circus of Life") Guati Rojo paints a circus with three clowns in the foreground, aerialist and a man on a unicycle. The man on the unicycle is said to be Guati Rojo himself. Rojo painted himself into the work in order to show the viewer his participation in the "Circus of Life". The meaning of this work is to explain the act of creating theater in one's life in order to bring attention to certain subject. In the case of Guati Rojo, it was to bring attention to his museum and the art of watercolor. Guati Rojo tried to spark Mexican interest in the art of watercolor in the 20th century. Besides artist such as, Agapito Rincon Piña, Cristina Romero and Gral. Ignacio Beteta, who experimented with water color, most other artist experimented with other mediums.

== See also ==
- List of people from Morelos
