= Lenart Regional Gifted Center =

Ted Lenart Regional Gifted Center
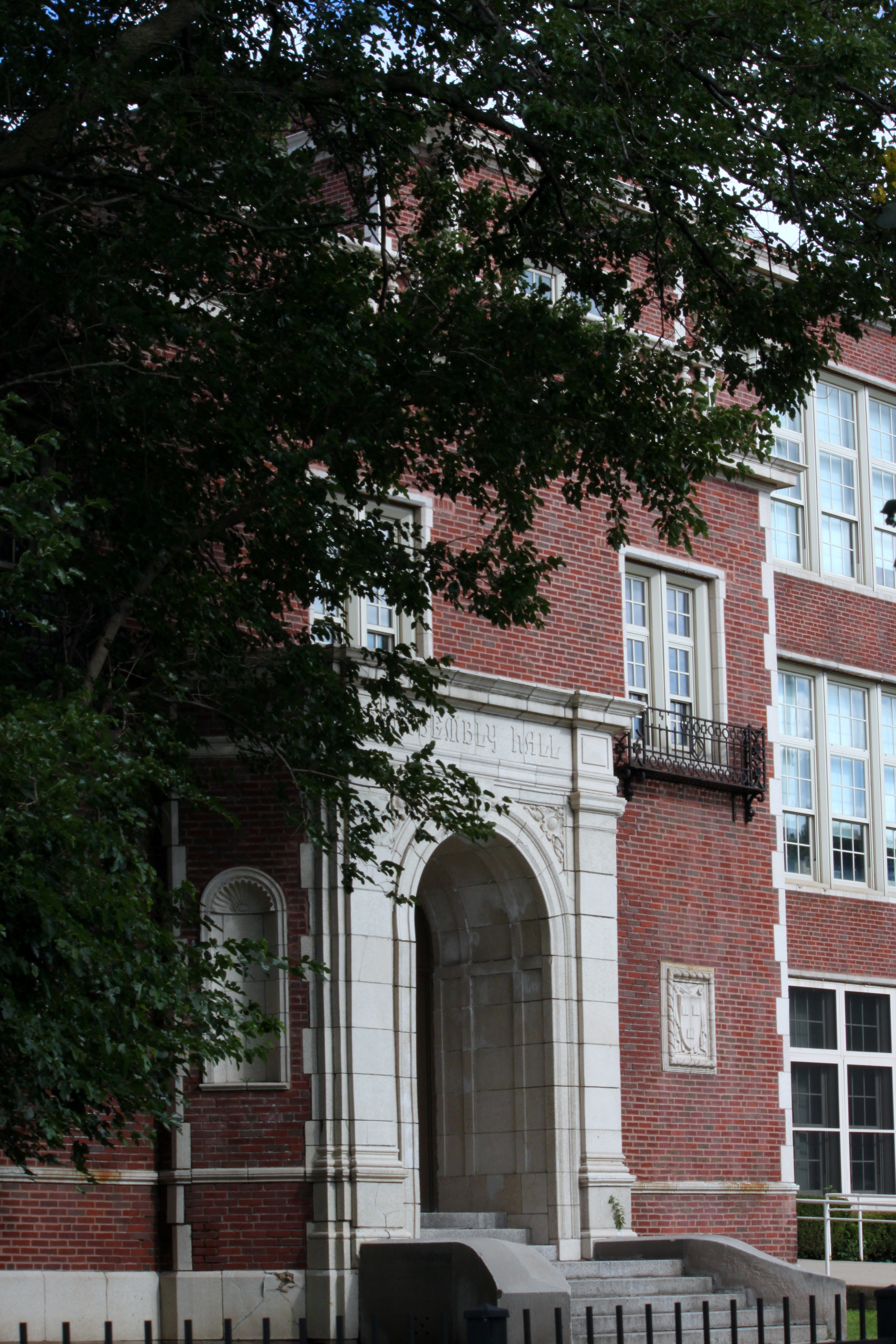
- Lenart Regional Gifted Center entrance

Location
- 8101 South LaSalle St. Chicago, Illinois 60620; United States; 41°54′25.04″N 87°40′40.37″W

Information
- Type: Selective admissions school, magnet elementary school
- Motto: Together we make our school a success!
- Established: 1988
- Oversight: Chicago Public Schools
- Principal: Taylor Adams
- Grades: K-8
- Gender: Co-ed
- Enrollment: 221
- Campus type: Urban
- Colors: Red and white
- Nickname: The Lions
- Website: lenart.cps.edu

Ted Lenart Regional Gifted Center is located in the West Chatham neighborhood of Chicago, Illinois. Lenart School serves grades K-8 with a selective enrollment program for gifted students. The school is part of the Chicago Public Schools (CPS) system. Its students are referred to as the Lions.

== Admissions and curriculum ==
Lenart, along with Keller and Edison, is one of the three fully dedicated Regional Gifted Centers (RGCs) within the City of Chicago's Public School district. The RGCs provide accelerated pace instruction generally up to two years above grade level. The RGC curriculum focus is on critical thinking, logical reasoning and general problem solving skills. The Lenart curriculum also includes courses in French, Latin and philosophy. RGC admission selection is determined by the Chicago Public Schools Office of Academic Enhancement.

== History ==
Lenart Regional Gifted Center occupies the facility which once housed Amelia Dunne Hookway School. The building, which sits on 10 acres of land, was built in 1928 in the Gothic Revival style which was then popular. Inside, it has twelve New Deal era wall murals, four large ones representing historical periods of the United States (conquest, colonization, western expansion and modernity), and eight smaller ones representing local history and entitled "History of Chicago" (1939). These murals were commissioned for the school by Illinois Arts and Crafts Projects from Ralph (Ralf) Henricksen under the Works Progress Administration program.

Due to changing neighborhood demographics, the building became underutilized as an elementary school. Hookway Elementary School closed in 1981. A new school serving as a transitional high school for ninth graders, Cecil Partee Academic Preparatory Center, took its place. The transitional program was relocated to Chicago Vocational Career Academy to make room for a new program, whose sole objective was to serve gifted and academically talented students. After extensive renovation to the structure by the architectural firm JLA, the school reopened in 1988 to house the Lenart Regional Gifted Center exclusively. In 1999, yet another major building renovation was completed by SWWB Architects at a cost of $5.7 million.

The school is named after Chicago Public School System administrator Ted Lenart, who was instrumental in starting gifted schools in Chicago.

== Academic awards and recognitions ==
Lenart has been on the Illinois Honor Roll consecutively for many years, and issued the Award for Academic Excellence every year, which recognizes sustained excellence in elementary schools. 100% of its students pass the Illinois Standards Achievement Tests, with a substantial portion of them exceeding state standards.

In 2006, Chicago magazine ranked Lenart as the number one public school in the City of Chicago, out of 482 elementary schools; in 2012, it fell to 6th place in the magazine's rankings. The school has also been on their combined list of the top five most outstanding private and public schools in Illinois. In 2011, the school tied with several other schools for first place among 2,068 public elementary schools in Illinois on SchoolDigger. It was recognized by Chicago Public Schools as being in the category of Top 15 in the district, and with the highest value added in 2010 ISAT Reading Performance. In 2020, Lenart was awarded a National Blue Ribbon. Lenart is acknowledged by CPS as a Level 1 (Excellent Rating) school for its overall performance.
