= Ralf Henricksen =

American painter

Ralf C. Henricksen
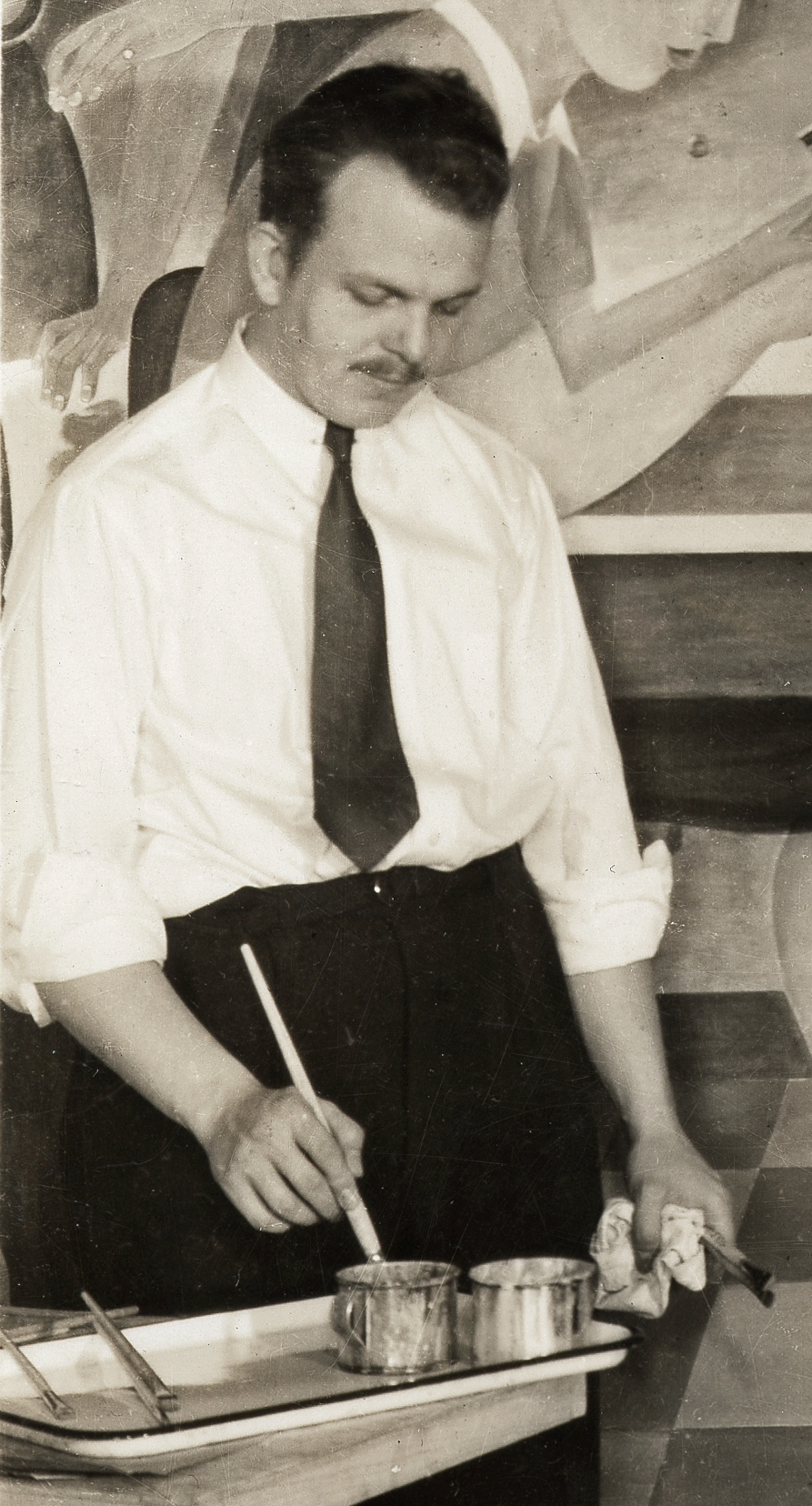
- Ralf Henricksen, 1938, from the Archives of American Art
- Born: 1907; Chicago, Illinois
- Died: 1975 (aged 67–68); East Lansing, Michigan
- Education: Art Institute of Chicago, Instituto Allende, Mexico City
- Known for: Art education, painting, murals, watercolor

Ralph (Ralf) Christian Henricksen (1907 in Chicago, IL, United States – 1975 in East Lansing, MI, US) was an American born art educator, watercolorist, painter, and muralist.

== Education ==
The son of Danish immigrant parents, Ralph Henricksen's father was a master craftsman who did decorative work in elegant homes and public buildings. He graduated from Hyde Park High School and earned his Bachelor of Fine Arts from The School of The Art Institute of Chicago, and his Master of Fine Arts from Instituto Allende in Mexico City. He also studied with Boris Anisfeld.

== Career ==
Henricksen did much of his work in Illinois as a painter, where his murals were commissioned by Illinois Arts and Crafts Projects, as part of the Works Progress Administration (WPA) during the 1930s and 1940s. Some of these are found at Gorton Community Center (Lake Forest, IL), Horace Mann School, (Oak Park, IL), and Hookway School (former Cecil A. Partee School; present day Lenart Regional Gifted Center), and at West Pullman Schools, the latter two located in Chicago, IL. Other public buildings where his work is present are Scott Field (IL), and The Park District Administration Building (IL). Murals were also commissioned to him as part of the Treasury Section of Fine Arts at the Stanton (IL) and Monroe (Michigan) Post Offices. He exhibited at the Art Institute of Chicago, the Museum of Modern Art, and Phillips Gallery. He taught at Michigan State University at East Lansing until his retirement.
