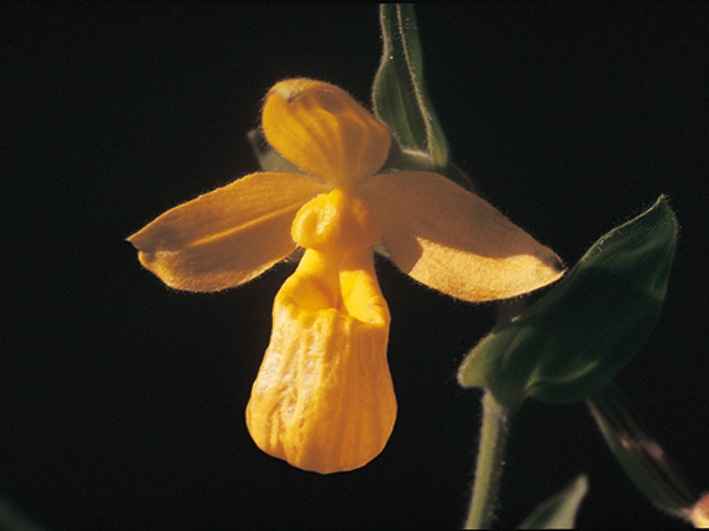

Conservation status
- Endangered (IUCN 3.1)

Scientific classification
- Kingdom: Plantae
- Clade: Tracheophytes
- Clade: Angiosperms
- Clade: Monocots
- Order: Asparagales
- Family: Orchidaceae
- Subfamily: Cypripedioideae
- Genus: Cypripedium
- Species: C. dickinsonianum

Binomial name
- Cypripedium dickinsonianum Hágsater, 1984

Synonyms
- Calceolus candidus (Muhl. ex Willd.) Nieuwl., 1913

= Cypripedium dickinsonianum =

Species of orchid

Cypripedium dickinsonianum is a species of orchid known as Dickinson's lady's slipper or Dickinson's cypripedium after American orchidist Stirling Dickinson.

== Description ==
It is a small puberulent orchid with only cauline leaves in an upright stem, which are clasping, elliptic to lanceolate, parallel-veined and plicate. The plant begins to bloom at 20 to 25 cm tall and may reach 42 cm. The plant may be colonial, propagating through rhizomes, but is often seen as a single stem.

The flowers are 2.5 to 3 cm and bright yellow. They open on a terminal raceme of one to eight flowers from bottom to top. Each flower is subtended by a leaflike bract. There are three sepals, the lower two of which are fused, and they are petal-like. There are three petals, the lower of which is a balloon-shaped lip. The lip is semi-transparent with bright yellow net-like lines, and with a more-or-less puckered mouth and enrolled margins. The flowers are reported to be self-pollinating.

== Distribution and habitat ==
It ranges from Southern Chiapas State, Mexico into Guatemala inhabiting open grassy slopes with shallow seeps on south facing hills in juniper woodlands at elevations of 1,000 to 1,450 meters.

Dickinson's lady's slipper prefers warm to cool temperatures and blooms in late spring and summer. This orchid has a reputation for being extremely difficult to cultivate.
