= Joseph F. Hlavacek =

American painter (1921–1982)

Joseph F. Hlavacek (July 13, 1921 – July 5, 1982) was an American painter from Whitewater, Wisconsin whose paintings, mixed oil and metal collages, drawings, and prints on themes of the natural world won him much acclaim in the Midwest and from art critics around the country. He was also recognized as a potter and draftsman.

== Biography ==
Hlavacek was born on July 13, 1921, in Kenosha, Wisconsin, to Frank and Cecilia Hlavacek of Czech/Yugoslavian descent. He graduated from the Layton School of Art in Milwaukee in 1949 (a school that would also produce artists Paul Faulkner, Knute Heldner, Karl Priebe, Walter Sheffer, among others). He received his master's degree in fine arts from the Instituto Allende, San Miguel de Allende, Mexico, in 1970. He was faculty in the art department at the University of Wisconsin-Whitewater from 1964 until his death in 1982.

Hlavacek was known for both the "force and originality of his symbolism...and the bold simplification of form and color which was his trademark" (The Milwaukee Journal, July 6, 1982). His inspiration came from the Wisconsin landscape and local plants, animals, and insects, and butterflies were a common theme in his later work. Following his study in San Miguel de Allende, Hlavacek's work also took on color palettes, objects, and patterns reminiscent of indigenous Mexican art.

Hlavacek described his motivation in an interview in 1952: "Today's world is just too real, too much with us, so I like to deal with what some might term unreality."

== Recognition ==
In 1952 he won first place in Hallmark's Second International Art Competition. His entry was reproduced in Life magazine. He also received purchase awards in Gimbels' Wisconsin Centennial competition and the Wisconsin Renaissance competition sponsored by Marine Banks. His art appears in many public and private collections, including those of the Milwaukee Art Museum, Museum of Wisconsin Art, Marquette University, Alverno College, The University of Wisconsin-Whitewater, and the Bergstrom-Mahler Museum, among many others.

== Personal life ==
Hlavacek was married to Joyce Hlavacek (Colburn) and had two sons, Fredric and Peter Hlavacek.
