= Phyllis Wiener =

American painter (1921–2013)

- Born: September 17, 1921; Iowa City, Iowa, U.S.
- Died: January 1, 2013 (aged 91); Minneapolis, Minnesota, U.S.
- Known for: Painting
- Movement: Modernism, Abstract expressionism, Abstract illusionism

Phyllis Wiener (September 17, 1921 – January 1, 2013) was an American painter. Wiener was one of the first female artists to embrace the Abstract Art Movement in Minnesota.

== Life and work ==
Wiener was born in Iowa City, Iowa. She studied with Grant Wood at the University of Iowa, 1940; Russel Green at Stephens Columbia College (Missouri), 1944; Cameron Booth at University of Minnesota in Minneapolis, 1950- 1953 & 1960-1962: and the Instituto Allende, Guanajuato, Mexico, 1961. Her first group exhibition was in Boulder, Colorado with the Boulder Artist's Guild in 1941. By 1944 her art had reached all regions of the United States. Then from 1954 - 1959 the American Federations of Arts Traveling Exhibition included her artworks. Under the U.S. State Department in 9162 her paintings were in a group exhibition that toured American Embassies of Europe providing international exposure. Her artwork was exhibited at the American Embassy in Papua New Guinea by the U.S. State Demaprment 1997. Her art career encompasses teaching art at the Walker Art Center, University of Minnesota at Minneapolis in the Extension Division and General College, Minnetonka Art Center at Minnetonka, Normandale Jr. College at Edina, and the College of St. Catherine at St. Paul.

=== Artistic style ===
Wiener's art was created, and then signed with her different last names throughout her life, since American women assumed their husbands last name during this era. This occurrence is common with women artists and if not documented will cause confusion in their lifetime body of work. Her maiden name is Zager with no art created under this name. She created, worked and exhibited under the following last names during these years: Phyllis Downs (1939–1961), Phyllis Ames (1962–1968) and Phyllis Wiener (1971–present). Wiener's work over the years has incorporated many interests, ranging from landscape and figure elements to multicultural textile patterns. Wiener became one of the first woman artists to garner serious attention in the male-dominated art world of the 1950s and 60s.

in 1984, Wiener's work was featured on the cover of Kalliope: A Journal of Women's Art and Literature.

In 1981, Phyllis Wiener said: “Cameron Booth taught me about painting. I had many painting instructors, but Cameron Booth knew, and taught me, Abstract Expressionist ideas. It was the way I came into painting.”

In 2005, Molly Priesmeyer said in City Pages:

During the '50s, Wiener was one of the few exhibiting woman artists in Minnesota. (Four of the 23 artists in "Abstract Painting: Selected Works" are female.) "There was a lot of chauvinism," she says. "I remember one time someone said, 'There are few women who ever make it.' And my friend said to him, 'Well! You know, there are few men who ever make it, too!'"
