= Nicolás Cuéllar =

Mexican artist

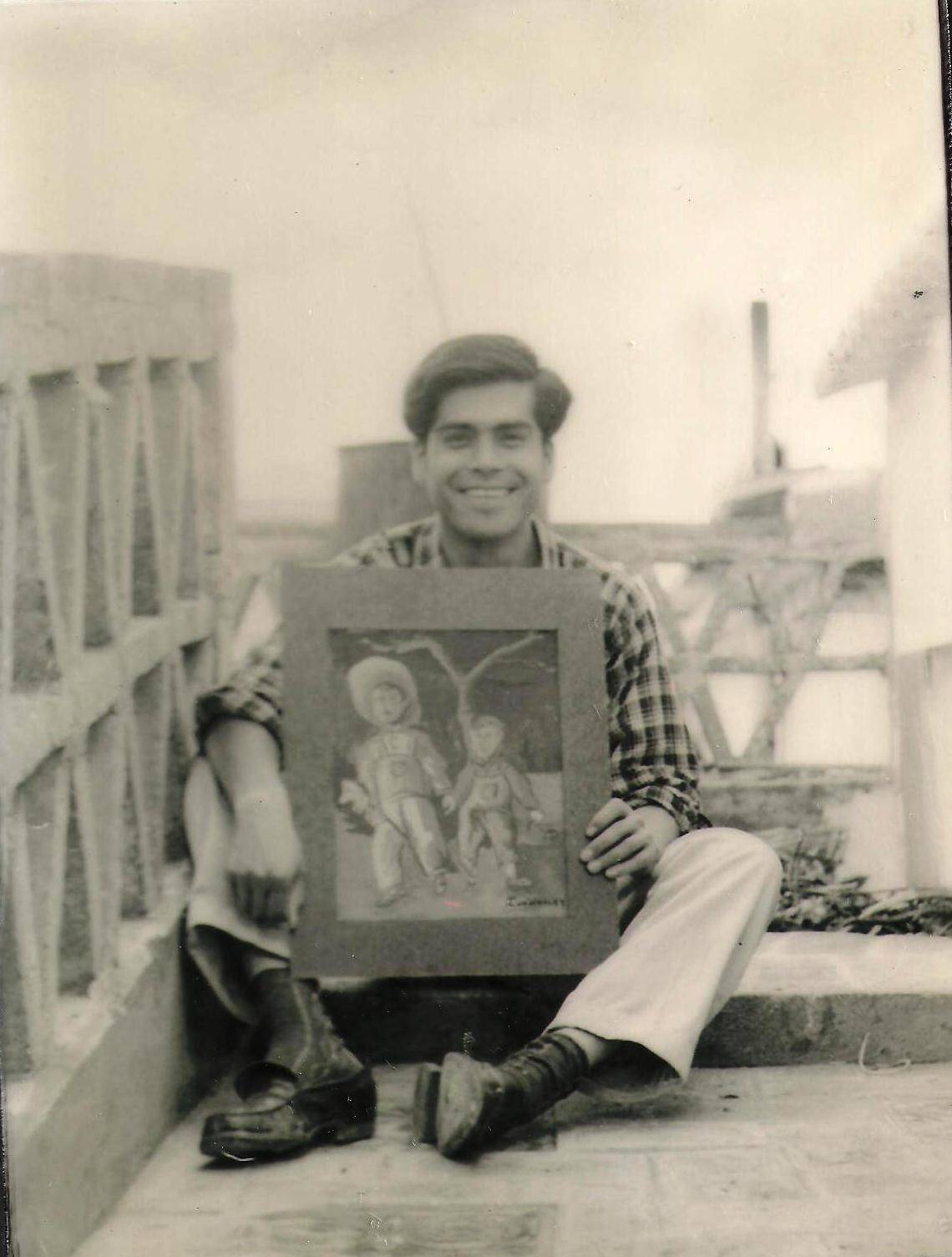
- Artist as a young man in 1957 with painting on the roof of his house in San Miguel de Allende
- Born: September 10, 1927
- Died: May 17, 2010 (aged 82)
- Website: cuellargallery.com

Jesús Nicolás Cuéllar (full name Jesús Nicolás Cuéllar Hernández, September 10, 1927 – May 17, 2010) was a Mexican painter who was best known for his surreal and magically themed work as well as his mentorship of the artistic community in his hometown of San Miguel de Allende. Some of his early work was noticed by Diego Rivera, who declared that the artist would be "a monster of painting." Although he studied and exhibited abroad and his works can be found in collections in various parts of the world, Cuéllar dedicated most of his career in his studio in San Miguel de Allende.

== Life ==
Nicolás Cuéllar was an artist, who was born and lived his entire life in the same house in the center of San Miguel de Allende (2ª. Calle de Jesús # 42). He is one of the few of this artists’ enclave who is from the town. He began painting by copying religious images, in part because his mother was religious and because the nuns at his school encouraged him, when they knew his skills with pencil and oil.

He initially went to study art at the Academy of San Carlos in México City, in 1954, but left shortly after to study at the Instituto Allende from 1955 to 1957, which suited his disposition better and considered it a major element in his development. In 1962, he received a scholarship to study at the Brooklyn Museum Art School, in New York. There he attended the class of Mark Samenfeld and had some exhibitions and was commissioned to paint two murals at the Brooklyn Methodist Hospital. After that, he got a teaching position in Maine. He went back to Mexico in 1963, shortly before finishing his studies. He rejected a teaching position at the Brooklyn Museum Art School because he was disappointed for the J.F. Kennedy assassination, but at the same time he was with new ideas and knowledge. When he returned to Mexico, he traveled all over the country to reencounter his inspiration roots. During and after that time he spent his time painting and experimenting, and he was very impressed by the Mexican old indigenous cultures, so he started archeology studies by himself and got more motifs and feelings to incorporate to his art works. Temporarily, he accepted a teaching position at San Carlos.

Some time after 72–73, he signed various painting series and some sculptures as Tonatiuh Cuéllar or T. Cuéllar, instead of only Cuéllar. This name is an Aztec word which means Sun. At that time he used to wear white clothes and his daughter remembers him as elegant, preferring light colored clothing and always wearing a hat, which he began wearing in the 1940s to cover the thick hair on his head. Every day the painter would leave his home in San Miguel de Allende to spend time in the main plaza of the city, after painting for several hours in the morning. Cuéllar developed most of his career in San Miguel de Allende, becoming well-respected in the artistic community as a mentor. His house hosted hundreds of artists and taught many of them. The house hosted a small gallery and studio, where an old Singer sewing machine table covered in a hand painted cloth served as the reception desk. In his later life, he lived with a parakeet and two cocks.

Cuéllar was married with María Socorro González (named "Coco" for him), and had eight children. He always was very proud of his family

When he died in San Miguel Allende in 2010, his family was with him.

In 2012, the city of San Miguel Allende paid tribute to "The painter from San Miguel Allende to the World", at the Angela Peralta Theater.

== Career ==
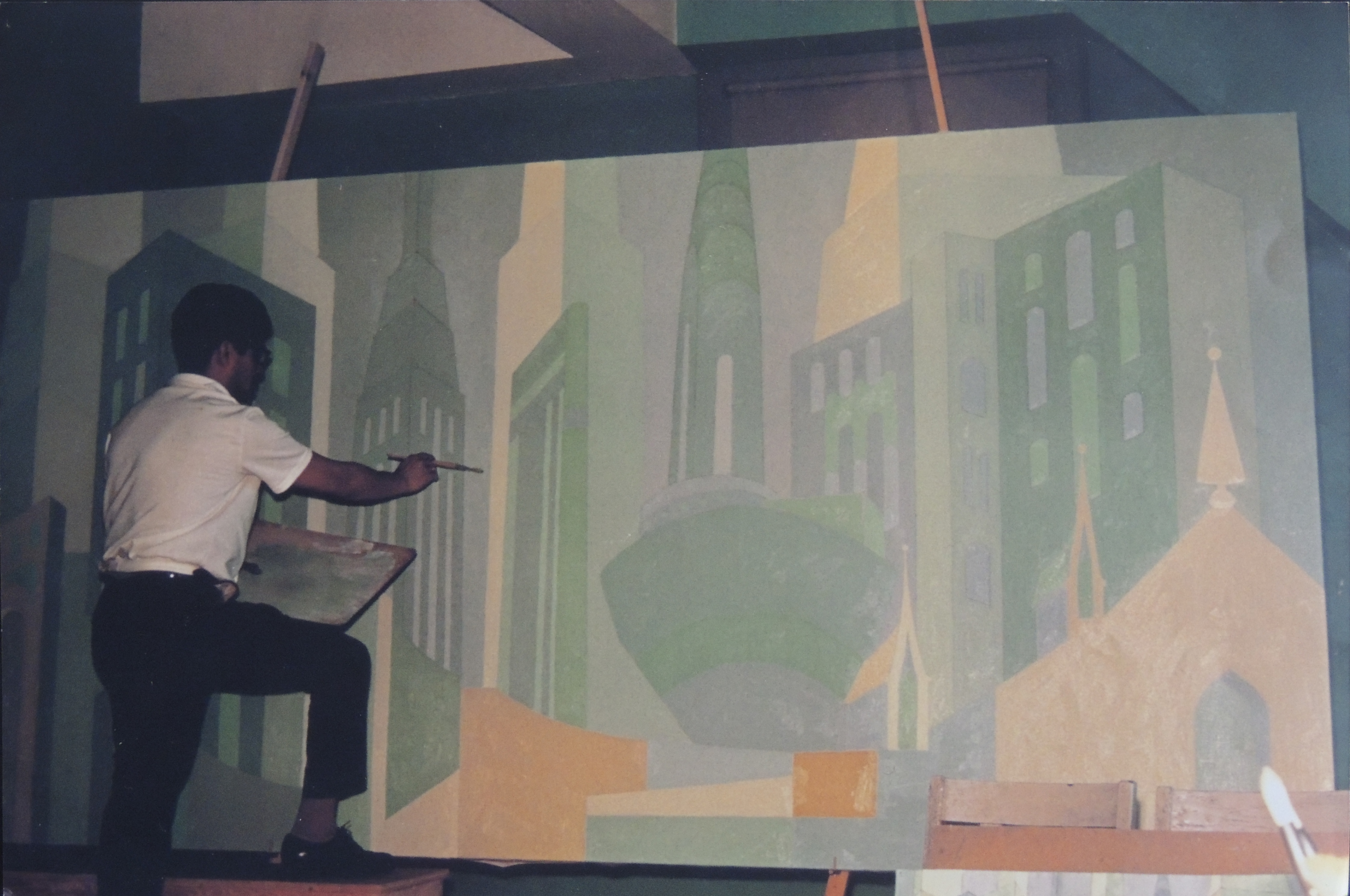
Painting mural at the Methodist Hospital in Brooklyn in 1963

Nicolás Cuéllar in his early career he also did work in making jewelry (common for artists in San Miguel de Allende), ceramics, sculpture, weavings and furniture making. In 1957, Diego Rivera saw some of Cuellar's lithographs and exclaimed that he would be "a monster of painting.".

His first exhibition was in 1955 at the Instituto Allende. These were followed by other local exhibitions in Guanajuato (1956), El Patio (1957) and at the Zaguan Gallery (1958) in San Miguel de Allende.

In 1961 he exhibited at the Art Center L’Ely See, El Greco Gallery, the University of Montreal and the French Library in Montreal, followed by solo exhibitions at the Rotary Club in San Miguel de Allende and in Querétaro. In 1963 he exhibited at the Brooklyn Museum of Art in New York and in 1965 at the Gallery Mardi Gras in Mexico City.

In the 1980s he exhibited at the Saint Paul Episcopalian Church in San Miguel Allende (1981), the Instituto Allende (1983), the Casa de Cultura in Monterrey (1985), the San Miguel Library in San Miguel de Allende (1985), the Celaya Casa de Cultura (1986), Casa Fargo and Allende House Museum in San Miguel de Allende (1987) and Gallery 14 in San Miguel de Allende (1988).

In the 1990s he exhibited at the Office Pack, Open House and Instituto Allende in San Miguel de Allende (1991), Gallery Eugenia in San Miguel de Allende (1992), Museo Diego Rivera in Guanajuato (1993), Allende Museum House, Rotary Club and Juan Leny Gallery in San Miguel de Allende (1995), Del Valle University in San Miguel de Allende (1996), and at the Sacred Stone Gallery in Santa Fe, New Mexico.

In the 2000s, the exhibited at the Instituto Allende and Cuellar Gallery in San Miguel de Allende (2001), the Casa de Cultura in Monterrey (2002, 2004 and 2009), AR Gallery in Monterrey (2008) and the Santa Fe Galleries in New Mexico (2008).

Cuéllar created two murals during his career. The first was at the New York Methodist Hospital in 1963 and the second is at the Hermanos Aldama Elementary School in San Miguel de Allende, created in 1971 and restored in 2000.

Cuéllar taught art at the Academy of San Carlos and at the Instituto Allende but later in his life he stopped working with institution, but continued to have private students.

His works can be found in collections in Mexico, the United States, England, Canada, Germany, Australia, Central and South America. About 600 of his works have been catalogued more remain.

== Artistry ==
Nicolás Cuellar is best known for his surrealism and the Expressionism-Surrealism work, which he dedicated most of his creative life; this period of his work, is where we might consider his contribution to the fine arts. But not only, he contributed to the Abstract Art, also with his magical and surrealistic point of view. His inspiration fountain had many manners, styles, interpretations and sizes, some of them obsessions: one was the towers of his main church's town (San Miguel Archangel Church), which represent one of the center of his universe, the lands of his brain, to his veins. Sometimes the church acts like another true original signature of himself and appears in paintings like "Children playing around the temple", "Eve seduction", "Moshe". His works shows a mixture of pre Hispanic, fantasy and Biblical elements, drawing on Mexican folklore and the mysticism of medieval Europe. His work has been compared to Bosch, and he stated that his influences included De Chirico, Brugel, Monet, Laktionov and William Lake. This focus took root after his return to Mexico in the 1960s, when he began to paint medieval themes in somber tones, witches, prostitutes, magicians, astronomers, clergy along with peculiar and fantastic figures such as men and women with multiple heads. Backgrounds often contained images of houses and mountains, and mountains that looked like cities. In this work he often played the role of a magician, conjuring a fantasy world, magical and often scary. He wrote once that he wanted to be "a harlequin and a goblin, a magician and an artist, a chess pawn and a king. Some of his paintings are: "Song of the Moon" (1958), "Nicholas´games" (1977), "Moshe" (1980"), "Erotism" (1992),"New York 11-09" (2001).
