= Reva Brooks =

Canadian photographer (1913–2004)

- Leonard and Reva Brooks in San Miguel de Allende in 1948
- Born: Reva Silverman; May 1913; Toronto, Ontario, Canada
- Died: 24 January 2004 (aged 90); San Miguel de Allende in Mexico
- Occupation: Photographer

Reva Brooks (May 1913 – 24 January 2004) was a Canadian photographer who did much of her work in and around San Miguel de Allende, Guanajuato, in Mexico. The San Francisco Museum of Art chose Reva Brooks as one of the top 50 women photographers in history.

== Career ==
Reva Silverman was born in Toronto, Ontario, in May 1913. Her parents, Moritz Silverman and Jenny Kleinberg had immigrated to Canada from Poland. Moritz arrived in Toronto in 1905 and began work in the Jewish garment district on Spadina Avenue, and after three years had saved enough money to send for Jenny, whom he married at once. Moritz Silverman set himself up in a tailoring and pressing shop, where Reva and her six siblings were raised.

In 1935, she married the artist Frank Leonard Brooks. While they were on a trip to San Miguel de Allende she took up photography. The couple were early members of what became a well-known colony of artists in that town. They arrived in 1947, planning to stay for a year while Frank Brooks studied painting, and eventually stayed for fifty years.

On 12 August 1950, Leonard and Reva Brooks, as well as Stirling Dickinson and five other American teachers, were deported from Mexico. The official reason was that they did not have proper work visas but the cause may have been a falling out with the owner of a rival art school. Leonard Brooks managed to get the order lifted so they could return through his contact with General Ignacio M. Beteta, to whom he had once given advice on painting and whose brother Ramón Beteta Quintana was an influential politician at the national level.

== Work ==
In September–October 1950, before the official opening of the Instituto Allende in San Miguel, it held an exhibition of the work of local artists. Works by both Leonard and Reva Brooks were included in this show. Reva Brooks' photography was first recognized and praised by Minor White in 1952 when Reva's portrait of solemn-faced Anciana (Dona Chencha), was reproduced on the third cover of Aperture, a nascent publication with a mission to be a forum for the advancement of excellence in photography. That same year, Reva Brooks sold one of her most famous photographs, Confrontation, a picture taken by Brooks in 1948 of a mother grieving over her dead child, to Edward Steichen, director of photography at the Museum of Modern Art (MOMA) in New York, and in 1955 the work was included in the MOMA's The Family of Man exhibition, one of the first major exhibitions of photography. (It was included in a section addressing the idea of "universal death" - the consequence of the hydrogen bomb, still a postwar fear in public consciousness). Much enlarged from the original print, it was the first one in view among the work of well-known photographers, such as Roman Vishniac. In 1975, Dead Child, of the boy in Confrontation, was included in her series of five photographs in the exhibition Women of Photography: An Historical Survey, at the San Francisco Museum of Art. It brought Reva new attention, identifying her as the leading woman photographer in Mexico, and Canadian.

Reva Brooks (with her husband Frank Leonard Brooks) exhibited at Eaton's Art Gallery, Toronto, in 1949. A larger forum for her work was provided by Expo 67 in the International Exhibition of Photography: The Camera as Witness. Although individual photographers remained unnamed in favour of an all-encompassing theme of optimism, Reva’s images were identifiable by subject due to their human interest. Once again, her work was seen among esteemed photographers, such as Inge Morath.

In 1976, her work was included in an exhibition at the National Gallery of Canada, and in 1989, at the Art Gallery of Windsor, Ontario. Reva Brooks' first solo show was in 1998 at the Stephen Bulger Gallery, Toronto, followed with a joint exhibition with Leonard Brooks at the Edward Day Gallery, Kingston, Ontario. She participated in many exhibitions in Canada and abroad, such as her retrospective at the Canadian Museum of Contemporary Photography, Ottawa, in 2000, with her last solo show being a retrospective at the Art Gallery of Ontario in 2002.

She died in San Miguel de Allende in 2004.
