= Luis Gutierrez (artist) =

American artist (born 1933)

Luis Gutierrez is an American artist based in Los Gatos, California, USA.

== Biography ==
Luis Gutierrez was born in Pittsburg, California to a Mexican-American family, in 1933. He received an A.A. degree from Diablo Valley College in 1954; a B.A. degree from San Jose State University in 1957; and an M.F.A. degree from the Instituto San Miguel Allende in 1958. He has taught at Pittsburg High School and San Jose City College.

Graduating from high school and having won a Bank of America merit award in art, Gutierrez enrolled at Diablo Valley College in 1952 and was mentored by an art teacher, who steered him towards obtaining a bachelor's degree from San Jose State University. Supported by the patronage of further art professionals, Gutierrez finished his graduate studies at the Instituto Allende in Mexico’s San Miguel de Allende, an outpost of Berkeley art instructors, GI Bill students, and international modernism. There, Gutierrez continued working through the influence of Picasso and Matisse. Returning to San Jose, he took a teaching job at San Jose City College, where he inspired students with unorthodox assignments, such as making a piece based on a shameful secret, or drawing with the left hand, so as to circumvent the censorious left brain and its obedient right hand. Gutierrez assimilated aspects of Abstract Expressionism, the Bay Area Figuration, Beat, Funk, and Pop into his practice. Gutierrez retired in 1995.

== Selected solo and two-person exhibitions ==
1958: Instituto Allende, San Miguel de Allende, Mexico
1960: Saint Mary's College, Moraga, California
1961: San Jose State College, San Jose, California
1971: De Young Memorial Museum, San Francisco, California
1973: Sonoma State University Art Gallery, Rohnert Park, California
1974: Chico State University Art Gallery, Chico, California
1979: Mexican Museum, San Francisco, California
1989: Lucy Berman Gallery, Palo Alto, California
1994: Lucy Berman Gallery, Palo Alto, California
2000: Tercera Gallery, Los Gatos, California
2007: Triton Museum of Art, Santa Clara, California
2010: Axis Gallery, San Jose, California
2011: Togonon Gallery, San Francisco, California

== Selected group exhibitions ==
1960-1961: Oakland Museum, Oakland, CA
1960-1964: San Francisco Museum of Art (now SFMOMA), San Francisco, CA
1963: Richmond Art Center, Richmond, California
1963: Palace of the Legion of Honor, San Francisco, California
1965: University of Illinois Krannert Art Museum, Champaign, Illinois
1965–1966: Purdue University, Indiana
1972: Oakland Museum and Mills College, California
1973: San Jose Museum of Modern Art, San Jose, California
1976: Bell Chicago Gallery, Chicago, Illinois; Witte Memorial Museum, San Antonio, Texas; De Cordova Museum, Lincoln, Massachusetts; Illinois State Museum, Springfield, Illinois; The Mexican Museum, San Francisco, California; Boise Gallery of Art, Boise, Idaho
1976: Mary Porter Sesnon Art Gallery, Santa Cruz, California
1983: San Jose City College Art Gallery, San Jose, California, Art Faculty Exhibition
2002: Triton Museum, Santa Clara, California

== Awards ==
1962 James D. Phelan Award, San Francisco, California
1962 Ford Foundation Purchase Award, New York
1966 Louis Comfort Tiffany Foundation Grant, New York City
