= Edison Regional Gifted Center =

Location
- 4929 N Sawyer Ave; Chicago, Illinois 60625; United States

Information
- Type: Selective Enrollment
- Motto: Empathy. Integrity. Open Mindedness.
- Established: 1975
- Oversight: Chicago Public Schools
- Principal: Dr. Karen Valentine
- Grades: K-8
- Gender: Co-ed
- Enrollment: 265
- Campus type: Urban
- Color: Blue
- Website: www.edisongifted.com

The Edison Regional Gifted Center (Edison RGC aka ERGC) is located in the Albany Park neighborhood of Chicago, Illinois. Edison RGC offers an accelerated and enriched program to gifted students in kindergarten through eighth grades. The school is part of the Chicago Public Schools (CPS) system. It was established in 1975.

== Admissions and curriculum ==
Edison, along with Keller and Lenart, is one of the three fully dedicated Regional Gifted Centers (RGCs) within the City of Chicago's Public School district. The RGCs provide accelerated pace instruction generally up to two years above grade level. The RGC curriculum focus is on critical thinking, logical reasoning and general problem solving skills.

Admission to Edison and other RGCs is based on testing done by Chicago Public Schools (CPS) in accordance with the policies of the Office of Access and Enrollment (OAE).

== Academic awards and recognitions ==
In 2025, Edison RGC was ranked #1 in Illinois Elementary Schools, #1 in Illinois Middle Schools, #1 in Chicago Public Schools Elementary Schools, and #1 in Chicago Public Schools Middle Schools on the 2025 U.S. News & World Report Ranking.

It was also selected as a CPS exemplary School for 2025.

== History ==
Established in 1975 the Edison Regional Gifted Center moved from its original location on Olcott Avenue to a new one at 4929 North Sawyer Avenue in 2008. The Building is a shared facility along with the Albany Park Multicultural Academy (APMA).

== See also ==
- List of schools in Chicago Public Schools
- Chicago Public Schools
