= Spider Webb (tattoo artist) =

American tattoo artist (1944–2022)

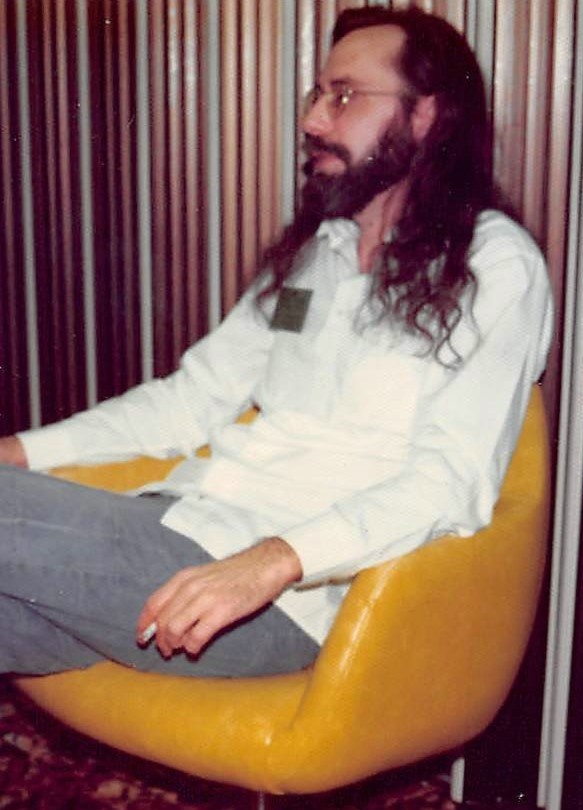
- O'Sullivan in 1978
- Born: Joseph Patrick O'Sullivan; March 3, 1944; The Bronx, New York, U.S.
- Died: July 2, 2022 (aged 78); Asheville, North Carolina, U.S.
- Occupation: Tattoo artist

Joseph Patrick O'Sullivan (March 3, 1944 – July 2, 2022), known professionally as Spider Webb after the character from the 1937 serial film Tim Tyler's Luck, was an American tattoo artist.

== Life and career ==
Joseph O'Sullivan was born in The Bronx, New York, the son Tecla Baranowicz and David O'Sullivan. At the age of fourteen, he visited a tattoo artist in Coney Island, New York, and received his first tattoo. He discovered his love for the process and pursued a career in tattooing. He served in the United States Navy from 1962 to 1966. After his discharge, he attended the School of Visual Arts, earning his bachelor's degree in 1970. He then emigrated to Mexico, and attended Instituto Allende, earning his master's degree.

O'Sullivan opened a tattoo parlor in Mount Vernon, New York. The Courier-Post stated he had some of his work shown near the Museum of Modern Art. In 1976, he took part in a tattoo protest to keep tattooing from being banned in New York, stating that "tattooing is perfectly safe". In 1978, he was arrested for tattooing without a license, and in 1981, he showed his work again from 1976. He worked with sex educator Annie Sprinkle in the past as a tattoo artist, and had a legal case about his tattooing work that New York ended up dropping. Aside from tattooing, he was the author of two books.

== Death ==
O'Sullivan died on July 2, 2022, from chronic obstructive pulmonary disease at his home in Asheville, North Carolina, at the age of 78.
