= Jolie Stahl =

American artist

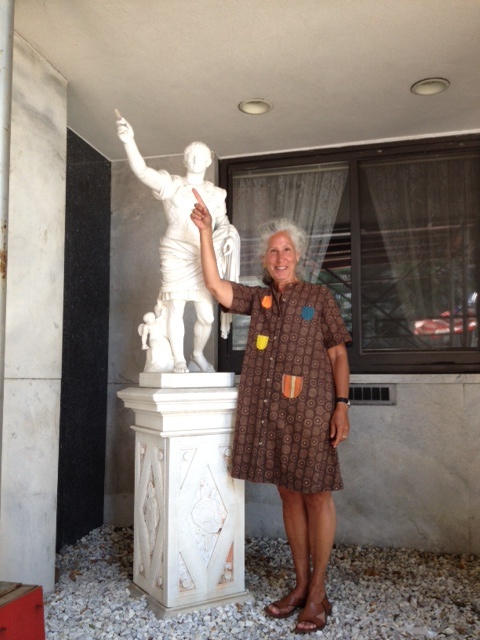
- Jolie Stahl (right) beside a replica of a statue of Roman Emperor Augustus in 2010
- Born: 1950 (age 75–76)
- Spouse: Robert Dannin
- Website: www.joliestahl.com

Jolie Stahl (born 1950) is an American painter, sculptor, printer, and photographer. She has worked as a journalist and anthropologist.

== Early life and education ==
Stahl spent her childhood in Los Angeles, California and later moved to New York where she attended the Dalton School. She then studied painting at the School of the Museum of Fine Arts, Boston (1968-1972); the Institute Allende in San Miguel, Mexico (1978); and the Skowhegan School of Painting and Sculpture in Skowhegan, Maine (1979).

== Colab ==
In 1979 she returned to New York and joined Colab (Collaborative Projects), a group that advocated for artist-driven cultural activism. She participated in The A. More Store exhibition by transferring her paintings and drawings into small multiples: such as plastic shopping bags, gravestone-rubbing place mats, and jigsaw puzzles. The A. More Store parodied the senseless commodification of the fine arts and appeared from 1982 to 1984 at Barbara Gladstone Gallery, Artists Space, ABC No Rio, Jack Tilton Gallery, and Printed Matter in New York. The A. More Store exhibition featured inexpensive works by some 150 artists, including Tom Otterness, Kiki Smith, Jenny Holzer, and Barbara Kruger. Her earliest silkscreen prints were part of a Colab project and also printed original inserts for the East Village literary publication, Between C & D Magazine in 1984.

== Painting ==
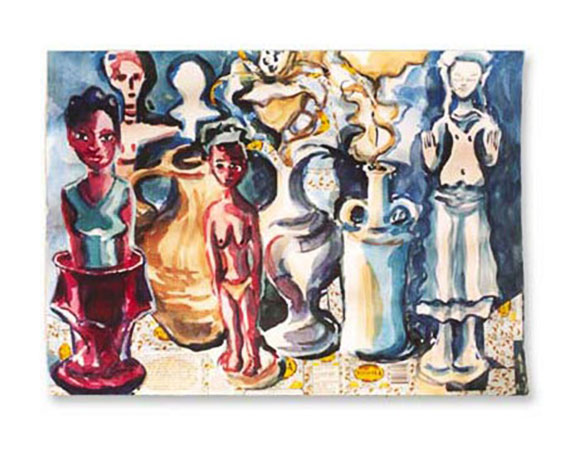
"The Genie's Out of the Bottle" (2002) Watercolor & Collage on paper

Beginning a period of extensive travel and journalistic work in 1985 Stahl took up aquarelle and collage as a more portable medium suitable for recording the variations of color and light in distant lands. While conducting ethnographic fieldwork in West Africa in 1991, she began collecting colons, vernacular wooden sculptures depicting African men and women in non-traditional jobs as seamstresses, dentists, attorneys, medical doctors, soldiers, filmmakers, race car drivers, and colonial administrators.

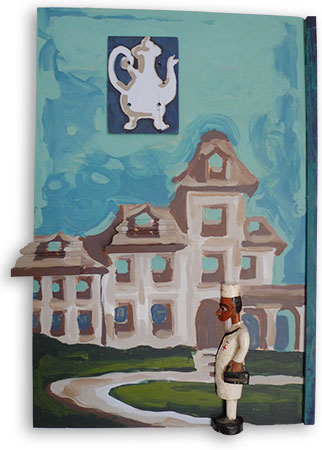
"House Call, Bellevue Ave." (2011) Plywood, Pittsburgh paint, molding and colon figure

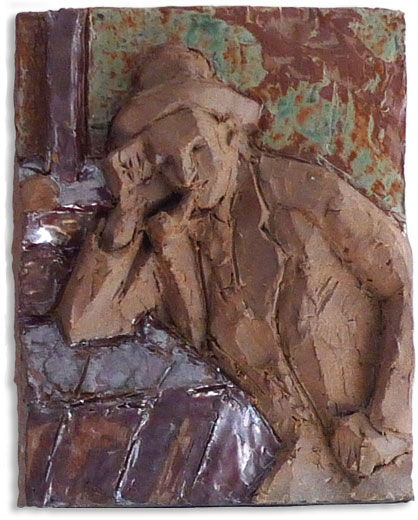
"Cezanne Smoker"(2010) Terracotta

== Photography ==
Stahl began work as a documentary photographer in 1985 using 35-mm black & white and color film in SLR and Rangefinder cameras. She worked as freelance photojournalist covering guerrilla wars in Nicaragua, El Salvador, and Honduras; military efforts to overthrow the dictatorship of Ferdinand Marcos in the Philippines; the Moro National Liberation Front separatist movement in Mindanao and the Sulu Archipelago; and squatter settlements in the cemeteries of Manila. The stories were published in NACLA Report on the Americas and Hijrah Magazine. From 1988 to 1993, she was a contributing photographer to The City Sun, a Brooklyn weekly newspaper. In 1997 her work appeared in the "Festival of Women Photographers" at the New York Public Library.

== Visual ethnography ==
Beginning in 1988 she performed fieldwork among American Muslim women and documented the entire project photographically. Some of this research took place in maximum-security penitentiaries in New York, California, and Ohio, studying the development of Muslim prison subcultures. She took the photographs for Black Pilgrimage to Islam, by her husband Robert Dannin.

== Bibliography ==
- Robert Dannin & Jolie Stahl, Black Pilgrimage to Islam, (New York: Oxford University Press, 2002)
