= Capula =

Coordinates: 19.6736°N 101.3933°W

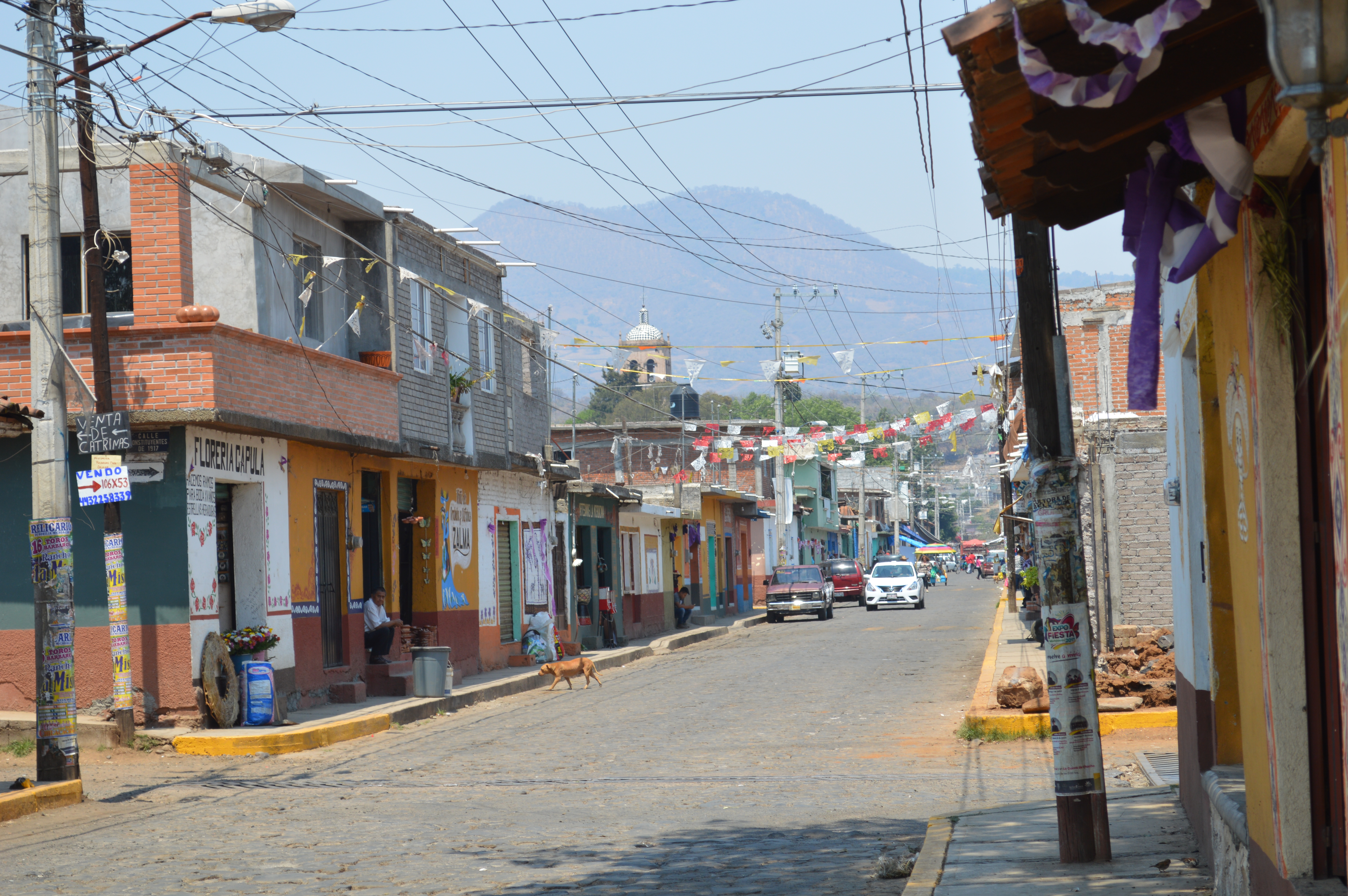

Capula Is a town in Michoacan whose name means "The Capulines" are located in the town of Morelia, Mexico and is known for its ceramics.

After the conquest of Mexico, Vasco de quiroga gathered the Purépecha Indians into several villages around Lake Pátzcuaro, and encouraged each to adopt a specific craft as a means to survival. His vision lives on years later: Capula for its rust-colored pottery.

During the autumn in this village held an annual festival called The Calacas of Capula which holds and exhibition of Capula artists
