= Stirling Dickinson =

American painter

- Dickinson in San Miguel de Allende by Peter Olwyler, 1958
- Born: 1909; Chicago, United States
- Died: October 27, 1998 (aged 88–89); San Miguel de Allende, Mexico
- Occupation: Art teacher
- Known for: Cypripedium dickinsonianum

Stirling Dickinson (1909 – October 27, 1998) was an American artist who spent much of his life in San Miguel de Allende, Guanajuato, in Mexico, where he was one of the first members of what would become a colony of expatriate artists from the United States and Canada.

== Early years ==
Willam Stirling Dickinson was the son of Francis Reynolds Dickinson (1880–1974) and Alice May Stirling (1884–1952). Dickinson's grandfather William Dickinson was born on a New Hampshire farm in 1837, moved to Chicago, and after joining the firm of Hugh McLennan & Co. became a millionaire trader in the Chicago grain futures market. His father, a Chicago lawyer, was a 1903 graduate of Harvard, where he was an editor of the Crimson and a member of Signet. Both were painfully shy, a trait that Stirling inherited. Stirling Dickinson was born in Chicago in 1909, and studied at the Berkshire School and then at Princeton University graduating in 1931. He attended the Art Institute of Chicago for post-graduate studies, and as a graduate student went to the Écoles d'Art Américaines in the Palace of Fontainebleau in France. However, he accepted that his talent would never place him in the top rank of artists.

In 1934 he and Heath Bowman, whom he had met at Princeton, made a six-month tour of Mexico in a green 1929 Ford Model A convertible. Bowman described their experiences in the light-hearted book Mexican Odyssey, which Dickinson illustrated. The book sold well. They wrote a second book on South America. Westward from Rio records their extremely difficult journey from Rio de Janeiro west to the shore of the Pacific Ocean. The two men then decided to write a novel based in Mexico, choosing to live in San Miguel while writing Death is Incidental, and first building a house that they called "Los Pocitos" in part of the ruins of an old tannery. The property cost just $90. After the book was published, Bowman married and moved away, and Dickinson bought his share of the house. He remained there, a bachelor, living very simply despite having inherited considerable wealth.

== San Miguel art schools ==
In 1938 Dickinson was appointed director of the Escuela Universitaria de Bellas Artes in San Miguel. Dickinson actively promoted the new school, visiting universities and cultural centers and handing out flyers in several U.S. cities. The school mostly targeted foreign students and wealthy Mexicans, but also offered low-cost workshops for local students, teaching traditional weaving and pottery techniques and thus helping to preserve their cultural traditions.

During World War II, Dickinson served in Naval Intelligence and the Office of Strategic Services in Washington and Italy between 1942 and 1945. When World War II ended in 1945, the G.I. Bill funded free education for veterans. Many took the opportunity to study art in San Miguel, where the cost of living was very low. The school hired the muralist David Alfaro Siqueiros as a lecturer, a prominent communist. He had a dispute with the school's owner, Alfredo Campanella, over funding. Most of the students supported Siqueiros, and in the end most of them walked out. The school was forced to close in 1949. Dickinson launched his own school, but without accreditation from the U.S. Embassy had difficulty attracting students.

On 12 August 1950 Dickinson was deported along with five other American teachers and the Canadian couple Leonard and Reva Brooks. The official reason was that they did not have proper work visas. It was said that Campanella had bribed officials to deport the teachers in revenge for the closure of his school. An article in the New York Times said the reason was that they had opposed U.S. involvement in the Korean War. Leonard Brooks was eventually able to get the deportation order lifted through his contact with General Ignacio M. Beteta, whose brother Ramón Beteta Quintana was an influential politician at the national level. On Dickinson's return to San Miguel, he became art director of the newly opened Instituto Allende.

On 29 August 1957 the New York Herald Tribune ran an article titled More than 100 Expatriate Reds in Mexico Viewed as Peril to US. It said: "Two of Mexico's most picturesque communities – Cuernavaca and San Miguel de Allende – have become the headquarters of some of America's richest and most active communists. The real leaders of the group, Embassy sources say, are [Albert] Maltz, [Maurice] Halperin, and a so-called 'mystery man' named William Sterling Dickinson...". Time magazine ran a version of the story titled "Red Haven" in which it said that Dickinson "keeps open house for communists and fellow travellers." A Chicago law firm of which Dickinson's father was a partner threatened to sue and obtained public apologies from both journals. The New York Herald Tribune published an article that praised the institute, the low cost of living and the diversity of the students, making a point of saying "there is nothing Bohemian about the Instituto's group."

Dickinson continued to work at the Instituto Allende until retiring in 1983.

== Other activities ==
Dickinson was charitable, and gave considerable anonymous assistance to the San Miguel community throughout his life there. He was involved in many programs including schools, the Lions club and the local hospital board. On the 400th anniversary of the founding of San Miguel he was formally adopted as a native son of the town. He founded a baseball team in San Miguel, and helped the players financially. In return, they helped him with his other passion, orchid collection. Encyclia dickinsoniana and Cypripedium dickinsonianum are named after him. He contributed article to the Bulletin of the American Orchid Society In his old age, after retiring from the Instituto Allende, he became involved in a rural library program, continuing to help until his death in a car accident on October 27, 1998, when his van ran off the road and fell over a 50 foot cliff.

== Legacy ==
Dickinson was one of the prime movers in establishing the conditions under which San Miguel revived economically and became a magnet for painters and sculptors as well as retirees from the United States. A campus at the Academia Internacional San Miguel de Allende bears his name. During the period from the 1950s to the 1970s the Instituto Allende attracted hundreds of students from the United States. Beat Generation writers including Jack Kerouac and Neal Cassady spent time in the town. By 2010 almost one tenth of the population, or 8,000 people, came from the United States.

Dickinson tried to get his students aware of the Mexican lifestyle and culture through excursions where they encountered the ordinary people of the region in their homes and workplaces.

== Bibliography ==
- Bowman, Heath; Dickinson, Stirling (1935). Mexican odyssey. Willett, Clark & company.
- Bowman, Heath; Dickinson, Stirling (1936). Westward from Rio. Willett, Clark & company.
- Bowman, Heath; Dickinson, Stirling (1937). Death is incidental: a story of revolution. Willett, Clark & company.
- Scott, Tom; Dickinson, Stirling (1969). San Miguel de Allende. Brandenburgh Press.
