= Edgardo Coghlan =

Mexican painter (1928–1995)

Edgardo Coghlan (1928 – September 28, 1995), was a Mexican painter who mostly specialized in watercolors depicting Mexican landscapes and people. His work became very popular during his lifetime, collected by museums, other institutions and Mexican presidents and today can be found in public and private collections in various parts of the world. His work was recognized with several awards.

== Life ==
Coghlan was born in Los Mochis, Sinaloa in 1928 to Irish and Mexican parents. His artistic interests and abilities became evident when he was a child, painting with watercolors due to limited resources. As a young man, he moved to Mexico City to complete his formal and artistic studies at the Academia Nacional de Artes Plásticas and in the studio of Spanish painter José Bardasano. He lived secluded, establishing his workshop in a remote town in the State of Mexico where he lived until his death in 1995.

== Career ==
Coghlan opened his own studio in the 1960s. In 1967 he traveled to Israel and Jordan, sponsored by a group of collectors. When he returned his entire production from the trip was purchased by the International Art Society, over sixty paintings and several pencil drawings. He was a co founder of the Sociedad Mexicana de Acuarelistas (Mexican Society of Watercolorists) to promote the idea that this medium should be considered equal to other forms of painting.

During his career, Coghlan exhibited his work in museums and galleries on various parts of the world, especially in Mexico and the United States. He had over twenty five individual exhibitions in Mexico City in venues such as the Exhibition Hall of the President of the Mexican Republic and INFONAVIT as well as Guadalajara, Mazatlán, Los Angeles, New York. In 2008, the Instituto Sinaloense de Culutra in Sinaloa held a retrospective of his work.

Coghlan’s work can be found in the collections of the Museo de Arte Moderno, the Museo de Arte in Sinaloa, Mitchel Museum in Mount Vernon, Illinois, the John F. Kennedy Presidential Library and Museum, the Ronald Reagan Presidential Library, Alfredo Guati Rojo National Watercolor Museum and various universities as well as in private collections in Mexico, the United States, Canada, Germany, Greece, the Netherlands, Scotland and Chile. The Toluca Watercolor Museum has forty of his works produced in 1992, valued at at least 100,000 pesos. His work was a favorite among Mexican presidents of the latter 20th century such as Adolfo López Mateos, Gustavo Díaz Ordaz, Luis Echeverría, Miguel de la Madrid and Carlos Salinas de Gortari .

Coghlan received his first major prize in 1954 from the Círculo de Bellas Artes in Mexico. In 1955 he received first prize for a watercolor at the Salón Annual de la Acuarela, with seven more following in the next seven years. In 1968, his work "El entierro" won the Exposición Solar of the Concurso Nacional at the Palacio de Bellas Artes, as part of the cultural events of the 1968 Summer Olympics. In 1991, the state of Sinaloa awarded him the Premio Sinaloa de Ciencias y Artes. Other honors include the Premio Nacional de la Acuarela.

The artist has also had a number of events and places named after him. The Fundacion Edgardo Coghlan was founded in 1993, headquartered in the State of Mexico. It was created by collectors of Coghlan’s work as well as various admirers. That same year, he helped to found the Toluca Watercolor Museum, with one of the halls named after him. The state of Sinaloa sponsors an annual event called the Salón de la Plástica Edgardo Coghlan in Sinaloa.

== Artistry ==
Coghlan’s speciality was watercolor although he also did carbon sketches and near the end of his life, oils. With his watercolors, his images were realistic enough to appear as photographs from a distance, with images extending to the very edges of the paper. Elements in his work include landscapes, walking paths, oceans, volcanos and scenes of Mexican people and customs. His later oil works were known for their attention to the effects of light.
