= Romeo Tabuena =

Filipino painter (1921–2015)

- Born: Romeo Villalva Tabuena; August 22, 1921; Iloilo City, Philippines
- Died: October 15, 2015 (aged 94); San Miguel de Allende, Guanajuato, Mexico
- Occupations: Painter and printmaker

Carabao, Watercolor painting on paper by Romeo Villalva Tabuena, c. 1950s, Honolulu Museum of Art

Romeo Villalva Tabuena (August 22, 1921 – October 15, 2015) was a Filipino painter and printmaker who was born in Iloilo City. He studied architecture at the Mapúa Institute of Technology in Manila and painting at the University of the Philippines. He also studied at the Art Students League of New York and at the Académie de la Grande Chaumière in Paris.

== Career ==
In 1955, Tabuena arrived in the colonial town of San Miguel de Allende, Mexico, to study at the Instituto Allende. He remained a resident of the town for the rest of his life, where he lived with his Norwegian wife Nina. However, he retained his Philippine citizenship. He painted the mural Filipiniana in the Philippine Embassy in Washington, D.C.

In 1965, he participated in the Eighth São Paulo Art Biennial as the official Filipino artist and as the art commissioner from the Philippines. The Honolulu Museum of Art holds his painting Carabao, which is typical of the artist's animal paintings.

== Works ==
Tabuena is listed in Who's Who in American Art, International Who's Who in Art, and International Who's Who of Intellectuals. He also appears on History of International Art-Italy, History of Contemporary Art-Italy, and on the International Book of Honor, America's Biographic Institute. He is included in 5000 Personalities of the World, Cambridge, England. His major works include, to name a few: Art Expo in New York City; One-man show in Gallerie Bleue in Manila, Philippines one-man show at the Palace of Fine Arts in Mexico City; participation in the VII Biennial São Paulo as the official Filipino artist and art commissioner from the Philippines, and in Galeria Tere Haas in Mexico City; Institute of Fine Arts in San Miguel de Allende, Mexico; and 10-year Retrospective Show at the Philippine Art Gallery with Publishing of Illustrative Monographs appraising his work of that period.

== Awards and recognitions ==
In October 1995, he was honored with a major exhibit sponsored by the Instituto de Bellas Artes, Centro Cultural Ignacio Ramírez El Nigromante for his 40 years of residency and dedication in the artistic life of Mexico in San Miguel de Allende, Guanajuato, Mexico. A similar exhibit in his honor was launched in November 1996 in Mexico in cooperation with the Philippine Embassy.

One of his major works after 1957 was a government commissioned mural, Filipiniaa, exhibited at the Philippine Embassy in Washington, D.C. He was also involved in the exhibit El Nigromante of the Mexican Institute of Fine Arts in celebration of 30 years of artistic life in Mexico.

He is the recipient of various awards and citations, including the Golden Centaur Award from the Accademia Italia, Master of Painting honoris cause from the International Seminar of Modern Art, Bannierre Europeanne des Artes, and Medaglia al Merito from the International Parliament.
