= Frank Leonard Brooks =

Canadian artist

Leonard Brooks
- Born: Frank Leonard Brooks; November 7, 1911; London, England
- Died: November 20, 2011 (aged 100); San Miguel de Allende, Mexico
- Known for: Painter, muralist, graphic artist, collagist
- Spouse(s): Reva (Silverman) Brooks; married 1935
- Elected: A.R.C.A., 1939; O.S.A., 1939; C.P.G., C.P.E., Arts and Letters Club, Toronto

Leonard Brooks (7 November 1911 – 20 November 2011) was a Canadian artist.

== Biography ==
Born in London, England, Brooks arrived in Canada in 1912. He studied art at Central Technical School, then the Ontario College of Art and with Frank Johnston (1929). Brooks taught at Northern Vocational School in Toronto and became an associate member of the Royal Canadian Academy of Arts in 1939.

He joined the Royal Canadian Navy Volunteer Reserve in May 1943. During his posting as an Official Second World War artist (August 1944 – May 1946), he painted the movements of an aircraft carrier in the waters of Scotland and the activities of mine sweepers and motor torpedo boats in the English Channel off Normandy. After the war, he obtained a grant from the Department of Veterans Affairs to study art in Mexico. He studied with David Alfaro Siqueiros.

Brooks was an accomplished musician. His mother gave him a violin when he was eight years old. He played first violin in concerts with the Guanajuato Symphony. He taught for many years in the music department at the Bellas Artes school in San Miguel de Allende.

On 12 August 1950 he and his wife Reva, as well as Stirling Dickinson and five other American teachers, were deported from Mexico. The official reason was that they did not have proper work visas but the cause may have been a falling out with the owner of a rival school. Leonard Brooks was eventually able to get the deportation order lifted through his contact with General Ignacio M. Beteta, whose brother Ramón Beteta Quintana was an influential politician at the national level.

Brooks published a number of works on watercolour and oil painting techniques.

He turned 100 on November 7, 2011. He died 20 November 2011 in San Miguel de Allende.

== Honours ==
- Associate Royal Canadian Academy (1939)

== See also ==
- Canadian official war artists
- San Miguel de Allende
