= List of ambassadors of Mexico to the United States =

Ambassador of Mexico to the United States of America
- Flag of Mexico
- Incumbent; Roberto Lazzeri since 24 June 2026
- Seat: Washington, D.C.
- Nominator: President of Mexico
- Inaugural holder: José Manuel Zozaya
- Formation: 25 September 1822
- Salary: US$12,114.42 per month
- Website: embamex.sre.gob.mx/eua/

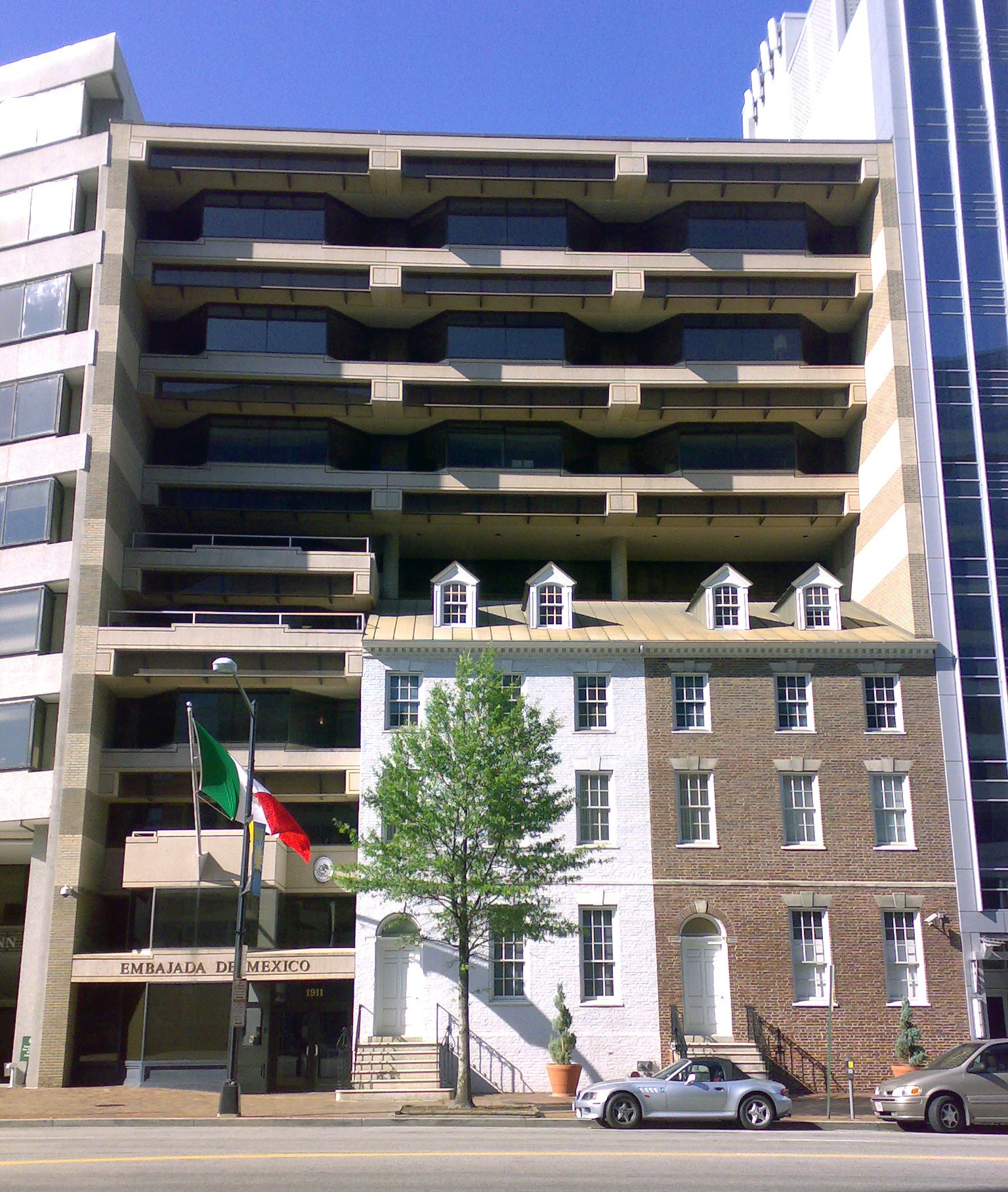
The Mexican Embassy in Washington DC

The ambassador of Mexico to the United States is the highest ranking diplomatic representative of the United Mexican States to the United States of America.

== Brief history ==
Mexico and the United States have maintained diplomatic relations since 12 December 1822. The first Mexican legation was composed by just four members:

- José Manuel Zozaya, envoy extraordinary and minister plenipotentiary, former attorney-in-fact (in Spanish: apoderado legal) of Agustín de Iturbide.
- José Anastasio Torrens, secretary, a former officer in the army of José María Morelos who was a close friend of José Manuel de Herrera and had studied in the United States.
- Francisco de Paula Tamariz, attaché and translator.
- Ignacio de Villaseñor y Cervantes, a Roman Catholic chaplain. According to historian Jorge Flores, this was a curious choice, and he was probably selected simply because they anticipated the lack of religious services in Spanish.

The first street address registered by the group when President James Monroe conferred diplomatic recognition on 12 December 1822 was the Strother's Hotel, on Pennsylvania Avenue and 14th street. The hotel, owned by John Tayloe III, was managed by John Strother from 1818 to 1824 and eventually became the Willard Hotel. The legation, however, lacked enough funds to settle in Washington, D.C., and had to rent a property in Philadelphia.

== List of diplomatic representatives ==
The following list includes every head of the legation recognized by Mexican Secretariat of Foreign Affairs. Since this is an official list, there are some omissions, such as Emeterio de la Garza, Jr., a special representative of Victoriano Huerta who tried to secure recognition for its administration between 1913–1914.

Diplomatic representatives of Mexico to the United States
Name	Rank	Appointment	Credentials	End of mission
José Manuel Zozaya	Envoy	25 September 1822	12 December 1822	20 May 1823
José Anastasio Torrens	Chargé d'affaires ad interim	3 May 1823	—N/a	31 August 1824
Pablo Obregón	Envoy	4 August 1824	18 November 1824	10 September 1828
José María Montoya	Chargé d'affaires ad interim	10 September 1828	—N/a	February 1830
José María Tornel	Envoy	17 November 1829	15 December 1829	1 June 1831
José María Montoya	Chargé d'affaires ad interim	6 June 1831	—N/a	31 December 1833
Joaquín María del Castillo	Chargé d'affaires ad interim	1 January 1834	—N/a	19 March 1836
Manuel Eduardo de Gorostiza	Envoy	4 January 1836	24 March 1836	5 November 1836
Joaquín María del Castillo	Chargé d'affaires ad interim	5 November 1836	—N/a	13 October 1837
Francisco Pizarro Martínez	Envoy	10 May 1837	17 October 1837	9 February 1840
Joaquín Velázquez de León	Chargé d'affaires ad interim	3 February 1842	—N/a	25 October 1842
Juan Nepomuceno Almonte	Envoy	20 July 1842	22 October 1842	6 March 1845
Luis de la Rosa Oteiza	Envoy	13 September 1848	22 December 1848	10 January 1852
Manuel Larráinzar	Envoy	5 March 1852	22 May 1852	1 July 1853
Juan Nepomuceno Almonte	Envoy	26 April 1853	7 July 1853	11 February 1856
Manuel Robles Pezuela	Envoy	29 November 1855	16 April 1856	12 July 1858
Gregorio Barandarián	Chargé d'affaires ad interim	12 July 1858	—N/a	26 April 1859
José María Mata	Envoy	2 March 1858	28 April 1859	13 August 1860
Matías Romero	Chargé d'affaires ad interim	10 August 1860	—N/a	3 April 1862
Matías Romero	Chargé d'affaires	3 April 1862	26 May 1862	7 May 1863
Matías Romero	Envoy	2 September 1863	29 October 1863	13 July 1868
Cayetano Romero	Envoy	16 July 1868	Unknown	9 August 1869
Ignacio Mariscal	Envoy	3 May 1869	11 August 1869	26 May 1877
José María Mata	Envoy	25 May 1877	1 July 1877	23 October 1877
José Tomás de Cuéllar	Chargé d'affaires ad interim	23 October 1877	—N/a	7 May 1878
Manuel María de Zamacona y Murphy	Envoy	9 April 1878	2 May 1878	3 March 1882
Matías Romero	Envoy	15 February 1882	7 March 1882	30 December 1898
Manuel Azpíroz	Ambassador	30 January 1899	30 March 1899	24 March 1905
Federico Gamboa	Chargé d'affaires ad interim	24 March 1905	—N/a	10 November 1905
Joaquín D. Cassasús	Ambassador	8 June 1905	15 November 1905	21 May 1906
Balbino Dávalos	Chargé d'affaires ad interim	28 June 1906	—N/a	3 March 1907
Enrique C. Creel Cuilty	Ambassador	14 December 1906	2 February 1907	25 September 1908
Francisco León de la Barra	Ambassador	13 November 1908	27 February 1909	25 March 1911
Manuel María de Zamacona e Inclán	Ambassador	5 April 1911	19 April 1911	16 July 1911
Gilberto Crespo y Martínez	Ambassador	5 June 1911	28 July 1911	10 April 1912
Manuel Calero y Sierra	Ambassador	10 April 1912	10 May 1912	27 December 1912
Manuel Pérez Romero	Confidential agent	18 June 1913	—N/a	30 October 1913
Roberto V. Pesqueira	Confidential agent	30 October 1913	—N/a	24 April 1914
Juan Francisco Urquidi	Confidential agent	15 May 1914	—N/a	29 October 1914
Rafael Zubarán	Confidential agent	29 October 1914	—N/a	17 December 1914
Eliseo Arredondo	Confidential agent	27 November 1914	—N/a	8 December 1915
Eliseo Arredondo	Ambassador	8 December 1915	24 February 1916	24 February 1917
Ignacio Bonillas	Ambassador	13 February 1917	17 April 1917	22 March 1920
Fernando Iglesias Calderón	Ambassador	9 June 1920	19 July 1920	31 October 1920
Roberto V. Pesqueira	Confidential agent	16 October 1920	—N/a	25 November 1920
Manuel C. Téllez	Chargé d'affaires ad interim	25 November 1920	—N/a	11 March 1921
Manuel Y. de Negri	Chargé d'affaires ad interim	11 March 1921	—N/a	3 September 1921
Manuel C. Téllez	Chargé d'affaires ad interim	3 September 1921	—N/a	13 December 1924
Manuel C. Téllez	Ambassador	1 January 1925	24 February 1925	16 October 1931
José Manuel Puig Casauranc	Ambassador	9 October 1931	9 November 1931	3 February 1933
Fernando González Roa	Ambassador	1 February 1933	21 February 1933	31 December 1934
Francisco Castillo Nájera	Ambassador	1 January 1935	20 February 1935	21 September 1945
Antonio Espinosa de los Monteros	Ambassador	1 October 1945	7 November 1945	1 October 1948
Rafael de la Colina Riquelme	Ambassador	1 December 1948	19 January 1949	9 February 1953
Manuel Tello Baurraud	Ambassador	1 December 1952	18 March 1953	25 November 1958
Antonio Carrillo Flores	Ambassador	1 December 1958	27 January 1959	1 December 1964
Hugo B. Margáin	Ambassador	31 December 1964	13 January 1965	16 August 1970
Emilio Rabasa Mishkin	Ambassador	23 September 1970	5 November 1970	30 November 1970
José Juan de Olloqui	Ambassador	16 January 1971	8 February 1971	30 November 1976
Hugo B. Margáin	Ambassador	29 December 1976	13 January 1977	28 March 1982
Bernardo Sepúlveda Amor	Ambassador	16 March 1982	12 April 1982	30 November 1982
Jorge Espinoza de los Reyes	Ambassador	23 December 1982	7 February 1983*	15 December 1988
Gustavo Petricioli	Ambassador	13 December 1988	17 January 1989	15 January 1993
Jorge Mario Montaño	Ambassador	10 December 1992	14 April 1993	2 February 1995
Jesús Silva-Herzog Flores	Ambassador	28 December 1994	20 March 1995	30 October 1997
Jesús Federico Reyes Heroles	Ambassador	1 October 1997	12 November 1997	30 November 2000
Juan José Bremer	Ambassador	15 December 2000	18 January 2001	27 February 2004
Carlos de Icaza	Ambassador	8 January 2004	31 March 2004	30- November 2006
Arturo Sarukhán	Ambassador	1 December 2006	27 February 2007	10 January 2013
Eduardo Medina Mora	Ambassador	9 January 2013	14 January 2013	10 March 2015
Alejandro Estivill	Chargé d'affaires ad interim	10 March 2015	—N/a	2 September 2015
Miguel Basáñez Ebergenyi	Ambassador	2 September 2015	—N/a	12 May 2016
Carlos Manuel Sada Solana	Ambassador	12 May 2016	—N/a	23 January 2017
Gerónimo Gutiérrez	Ambassador	23 January 2017	24 April 2017	30 November 2018
Martha Bárcena Coqui	Ambassador	21 December 2018	11 January 2019	12 February 2021
Esteban Moctezuma Barragán	Ambassador	15 February 2021	22 January 2021	24 June 2026
Roberto Lazzeri	Ambassador	10 June 2026	24 June 2026	Incumbent

== See also ==
- Mexico–United States relations
- Embassy of Mexico, Washington, D.C.
