= Fernando González Roa =

Mexican lawyer, politician and diplomat

Ambassador of Mexico to the United States
- In office 21 February 1933 – 31 December 1934
- Preceded by: José Manuel Puig Casauranc
- Succeeded by: Francisco Castillo Nájera

Personal details
- Born: 1880 Salamanca, Guanajuato
- Died: 1936 (aged 55–56)
- Spouse: Edmé Gutiérrez Zamora

Fernando González Roa (1880–1936) was a Mexican lawyer, politician and diplomat who served as undersecretary of the Interior and as ambassador of Mexico to the United States (1933–1934).

González was born in Salamanca, Guanajuato, and started his political career as secretary of Government of Guanajuato (1911-1913). After the 1913 coup d'état, he supported General Victoriano Huerta —a fact that would beset him during the Constituent Congress of 1916–1917. His close relationship with both Venustiano Carranza and Álvaro Obregón helped him to re-establish his political career.

As a diplomat, González represented his country in the 6th Pan-American Conference of Havana (1928), in the Commission of Inquiry and Conciliation between Bolivia and Paraguay (assembled in Washington, D.C., in 1929) and in both the Mexico-France and Mexico-United States Claims Commissions. His nomination to the later was privately contested by Luis L. León, secretary of Agriculture, who wrote a telegram to President Obregón alerting him that, in his opinion, despite Gonzalez' eloquence and erudition, he lacked initiative, talent and political expertise.

Aside from his political and diplomatic activities, González Roa served in the executive board of National Railways of Mexico and the Bank of Mexico; as member of the National Banking Commission and the Hague Permanent Court of International Arbitration; and as professor of Law at the National Autonomous University of Mexico (UNAM) and Free School of Law.

== Works ==
- El problema rural de México (1917).
- El problema ferrocarrilero y la compañía de los Ferrocarriles Nacionales de México (1917).
- El aspecto agrario de la revolución mexicana (1919).
