= Jesús Reyes Heroles =

Mexican politician & academic (1921–1985)

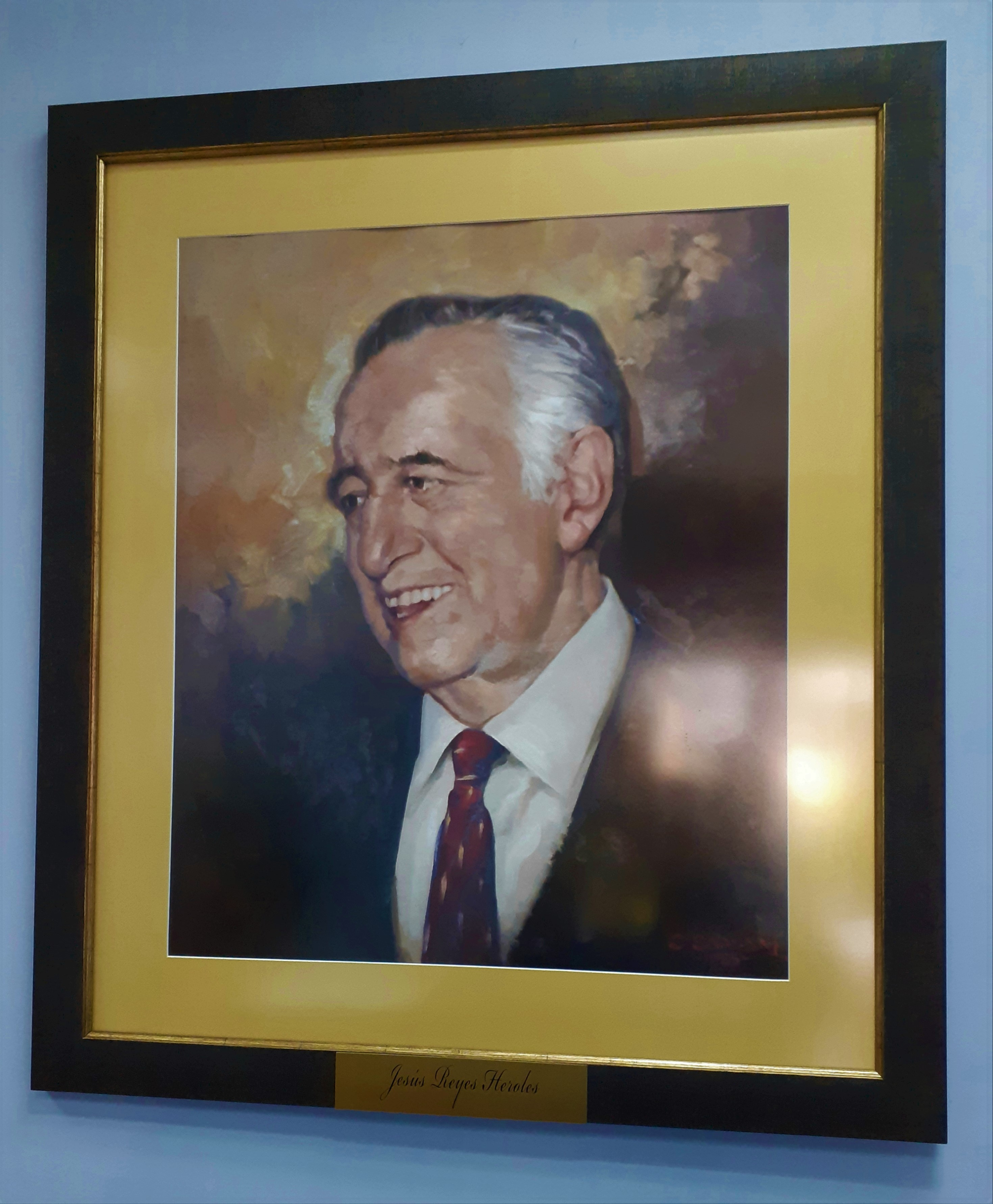
- Portrait of Reyes Heroles at the UNAM Law School

Secretary of Public Education
- In office 1 December 1982 – 19 March 1985

Secretary of the Interior
- In office 1 December 1976 – 7 May 1979

Director-General, IMSS
- In office 24 September 1975 – 30 November 1976

President of the PRI
- In office 21 February 1972 – 25 September 1975

Director-General, PEMEX
- In office 1 December 1964 – 30 November 1970

Member of the Chamber of Deputies
- In office 1 September 1961 – 31 August 1964
- Constituency: 2nd district of Veracruz

Personal details
- Born: 3 March 1921 Tuxpan, Veracruz, Mexico
- Died: 19 March 1985 (aged 64) Denver, Colorado, United States
- Party: PRI

Jesús Reyes Heroles (Note: In this Mexican name, the surname is Reyes and the second or maternal family name is Heroles.) (3 April 1921 – 19 March 1985) was a Mexican politician, jurist, historian and academic affiliated with the Institutional Revolutionary Party (PRI). The party acknowledges him as one of its leading ideologues.

== Early life ==
Jesús Reyes Heroles was born in Tuxpan, Veracruz, in 1921, to Jesús Reyes Martínez and Juana Heroles Lombera. In 1939 he gained admission to the law school of the National Autonomous University of Mexico (UNAM) and joined the Party of the Mexican Revolution (PRM), the forerunner of the later PRI. He graduated from the UNAM in 1944 and pursued studies in Argentina the following year. Between 1946 and 1963 he taught at both the UNAM and the National Polytechnic Institute (IPN).

== Political career ==
In the 1961 mid-term election, he was elected to the Chamber of Deputies for Veracruz's 2nd district. At the end of his term in Congress he was appointed director-general of Petróleos Mexicanos (PEMEX), where he remained throughout the presidential term of Gustavo Díaz Ordaz (1964–1970). During his time at PEMEX he oversaw the creation of the Mexican Petroleum Institute (IMP).

Reyes Heroles was elected to the Mexican Academy of History (AMH) in 1967. He was president of the Institutional Revolutionary Party from 1972 to 1975 and director-general of the Mexican Social Security Institute (IMSS) from 1975 to 1976.

In 1976, newly elected president José López Portillo appointed him Secretary of the Interior. He served in that position until 1979, during which time he oversaw the 1977 electoral reforms and the adoption of the Federal Law on Political Organizations and Electoral Procedures (LFOPPE), which increased the number of federal deputies, introduced a parallel voting system, and allowed opposition parties to register and contend in elections on a much fairer footing than had previously been the case.

Under Miguel de la Madrid, López Portillo's successor, Reyes Heroles served as secretary of public education from 1982 to 1985.

Jesús Reyes Heroles died on 19 March 1985 in Denver, United States, where he had gone to seek medical treatment for lung cancer.

== Family ==
Reyes Heroles was married to Gloria González Garza, the daughter of Federico González Garza. (Note: Roderic Camp identifies Gloria's father as Roque González Garza, Federico's brother, but this is contradicted by Miguel Ángel Granados Chapa in her obituary and by Federico Reyes Heroles in a December 2025 Excélsior column.) Their children were Jesús Federico Reyes Heroles (1952–2024), director-general of PEMEX, secretary of energy and ambassador to the United States, and Federico Reyes Heroles (born 1955), a noted writer and political commentator whose publications include Orfandad. El padre y el político, a biography of his father.
