= Manuel María de Zamacona y Murphy =

Mexican radical liberal lawyer, journalist and politician

Manuel María de Zamacona

Secretary of Foreign Affairs (Mexico)
- In office 13 July 1861 – 26 November 1861
- President: Benito Juárez
- Preceded by: León Guzmán
- Succeeded by: Manuel Doblado

Envoy Extraordinary and Minister Plenipotentiary of Mexico to the United States
- In office 2 May 1878 – 3 March 1882
- Preceded by: José Tomás de Cuéllar
- Succeeded by: Matías Romero

President of the Supreme Court of Justice of Mexico
- In office 1898–1898

Personal details
- Born: 13 September 1826 Puebla, Puebla
- Died: 29 May 1904 (aged 77) Mexico City
- Spouse: Joaquina Inclán
- Children: 2; including Manuel María de Zamacona e Inclán
- Education: Carolinian College (Puebla) and Seminary of Puebla

Manuel María Eutimio de Zamacona y Murphy (13 September 1826 – 29 May 1904) was a Mexican radical liberal lawyer, journalist, and politician. Born in Puebla, he studied at seminary and went on to practice law. As a journalist he founded El Siglo XIX, an influential newspaper founded in 1852. He served as minister of Foreign Affairs in the cabinet of President Benito Juárez (1861). He negotiated an agreement with the British Ambassador to Mexico, Charles Wyke, known as the Wyke-Zamacona Treaty, which sought an interim solution of the Juárez government's problems concerning the external debt to Great Britain, France, and Spain. When Juárez decided to suspend payments on the foreign debt in July 1861, he risked foreign intervention. The treaty was aimed at forestalling that, but it was rejected by the Mexican congress. With that rejection, Zamacona resigned from Juárez's government and went on to lead the liberal opposition to Juárez. He negotiated diplomatic recognition to the administration of President Porfirio Díaz from the government of the United States (1878) and presided over the Supreme Court of Justice.
