= Eduardo Medina-Mora Icaza =

Mexican politician

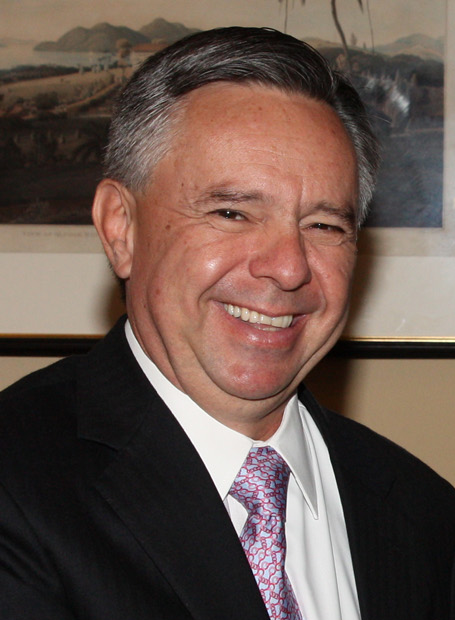

Minister of the Supreme Court of Justice of the Nation
- In office 10 March 2015 – 3 October 2019
- Appointed by: Enrique Peña Nieto
- Preceded by: Sergio Armando Valls
- Succeeded by: Margarita Ríos Farjat

Mexican Ambassador to the United States
- In office 14 January 2013 – 10 March 2015
- President: Enrique Peña Nieto
- Preceded by: Arturo Sarukhán
- Succeeded by: Alejandro Estivill (Acting)

Attorney General (Mexico)
- In office 1 December 2006 – 7 September 2009
- President: Felipe Calderón
- Preceded by: Daniel Cabeza de Vaca
- Succeeded by: Arturo Chávez Chávez

Secretary of Public Security of Mexico
- In office 28 September 2005 – 30 November 2006
- President: Vicente Fox
- Preceded by: Ramón Martín Huerta
- Succeeded by: Genaro García Luna

Personal details
- Born: 30 January 1957 (age 69) Mexico City
- Education: National Autonomous University of Mexico (UNAM)
- Occupation: Lawyer

Eduardo Tomás Medina-Mora Icaza (born 30 January 1957 in Mexico City) is a Mexican lawyer, politician and diplomat. He served as a Justice of the Supreme Court of Mexico from 10 March 2015 to 8 October 2019, when the Mexican Senate approved his resignation following a now closed investigation by the country's Financial Intelligence Unit.

Medina-Mora was the Attorney General of Mexico (PGR) under President Felipe Calderón (1 December 2006-7 September 2009).

== Political career ==
Prior to his Supreme Court Appointment and subsequent resignation, Medina-Mora also served Ambassador of Mexico to the United States (2013–15), ambassador to the United Kingdom, Attorney General in the cabinet of the former President of Mexico, Felipe Calderón (2006–09), headed the Secretariat of Security and Civilian Protection (2005–06) under former President of Mexico Vicente Fox., and as the director of the now defunct National Center for Intelligence and Security from (2000–05).

After a nine-year career in intelligence and security, President Calderon appointed Medina-Mora as Mexico's Ambassador to the United Kingdom; Medina-Mora was confirmed by the Senate on 12 November 2009 with 84 votes in his favour and 7 abstentions. No votes against his designation were received.

On 23 February 2010, Medina-Mora presented his credentials to Queen Elizabeth II at Buckingham Palace accrediting him as Mexico's representative to the United Kingdom. The Ambassador attended the ceremony accompanied by his wife, Laura and officials from the Mexican Embassy.

Medina-Mora was the Mexico's Ambassador in the United States presenting his credentials to President Barack Obama on 14 January 2013. He is also a member of the advisory board for the Mexico Institute.

On 10 March 2015, he was elected as Minister of the Mexican Nation's Supreme Court of Justice. He resigned as Ambassador of Mexico to the United States that same day. On 3 October 2019, Justice Medina-Mora Icaza resigned from the National Supreme Court of Justice (SCJN) after it was revealed he is under investigation by the country's Financial Intelligence Unit. These charges were later dropped due to a lack of evidence. In his time on the bench, Medina-Mora was a strong advocate for business interests, but also for the legalization of medical cannabis. He also voted to decriminalize abortion in cases of rape.

== Top Gear controversy ==
Following a broadcast of the television programme Top Gear on 30 January 2011, during which the presenters made several derogatory slurs depicting a stereotypical portrayal of Mexican culture and people, Medina-Mora wrote to the BBC about comments made by Richard Hammond, Jeremy Clarkson and James May about himself and Mexico, demanding a public apology from the BBC.

== Eligibility controversy ==
Medina-Mora has been seen as close to the Mexican right-wing PAN party, because he started to work as government official after being designated by the first PAN president of Mexico, Vicente Fox, and continued in to work in key government positions during that government and during Fox successor, president Felipe Calderon, also a PAN party affiliate.

Controversy arose regarding his bad reputation and eligibility as Minister of the Supreme Court of Justice for resigning as Ambassador to Mexico in the United States the same day he got elected as Minister because the Mexican Constitution stipulates in Article 95 that to be eligible as Minister you need to reside in the country for the past two years.

Additionally, his credentials were heavily criticized by Mexican scholars and Twitter campaigns appeared with the hashtag "#NoHaganMinistroaMedinaMora" ("Do not make Medina Mora Minister").

Political offices
Preceded by Sergio Armando Valls	Associate Justice of the Supreme Court of Justice of the Nation; March 2015–October 2019	Succeeded by Margarita Ríos Farjat
