= Eliseo Arredondo =

Mexican politician and diplomat (1870–1923)

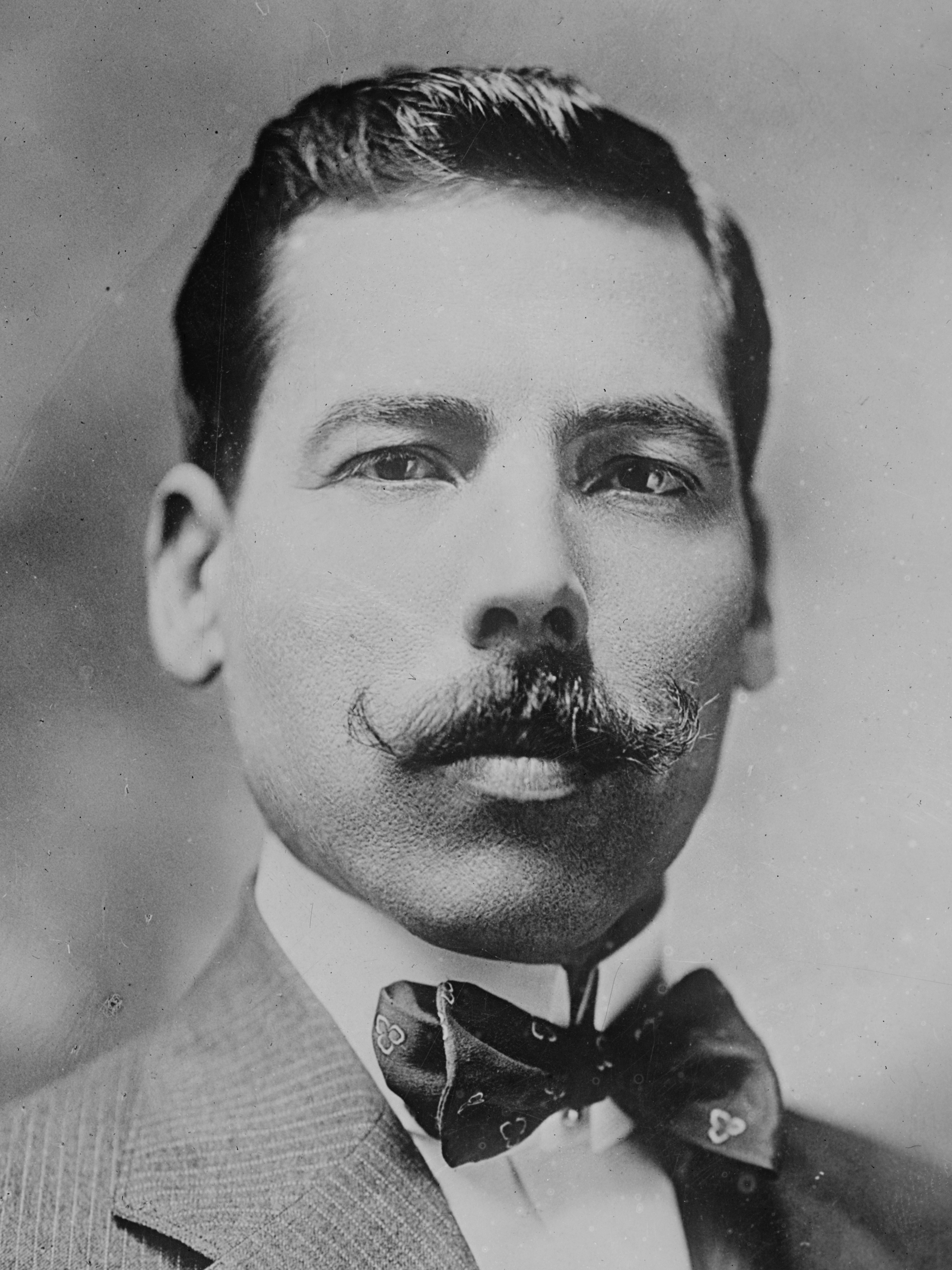

Secretary of the Interior (Mexico)
- In office 21 August 1914 – 29 November 1914
- President: Venustiano Carranza
- Preceded by: José María Luján
- Succeeded by: Rafael Zubarán

Ambassador of Mexico to the United States
- In office 24 February 1916 – 24 February 1917
- Preceded by: Manuel Calero y Sierra
- Succeeded by: Ignacio Bonillas

Personal details
- Born: Eliseo Arredondo de la Garza; 5 May 1870 Nava, Coahuila
- Died: 18 October 1923 (aged 53) Mexico City

Eliseo Arredondo de la Garza (5 May 1870 – 18 October 1923) was a Mexican politician and diplomat who briefly served as secretary of the Interior in the government of President Venustiano Carranza; his cousin and father-in-law. Arredondo also served as a federal congressman in the Chamber of Deputies, negotiated on behalf of Carranza with revolutionary leader, Pancho Villa, and, while working as chargé d'affaires in Washington, D.C., he secured diplomatic recognition for Carranza's administration from the United States government.

== Biography ==
He was born on 5 May 1870. He served as Secretary of the Interior from 21 August 1914 to 29 November 1914. He served as Ambassador of Mexico to the United States from 24 February 1916 to 24 February 1917. In April 1918 he was transferred to the embassy in Madrid. He died on 18 October 1923.

== Gallery ==
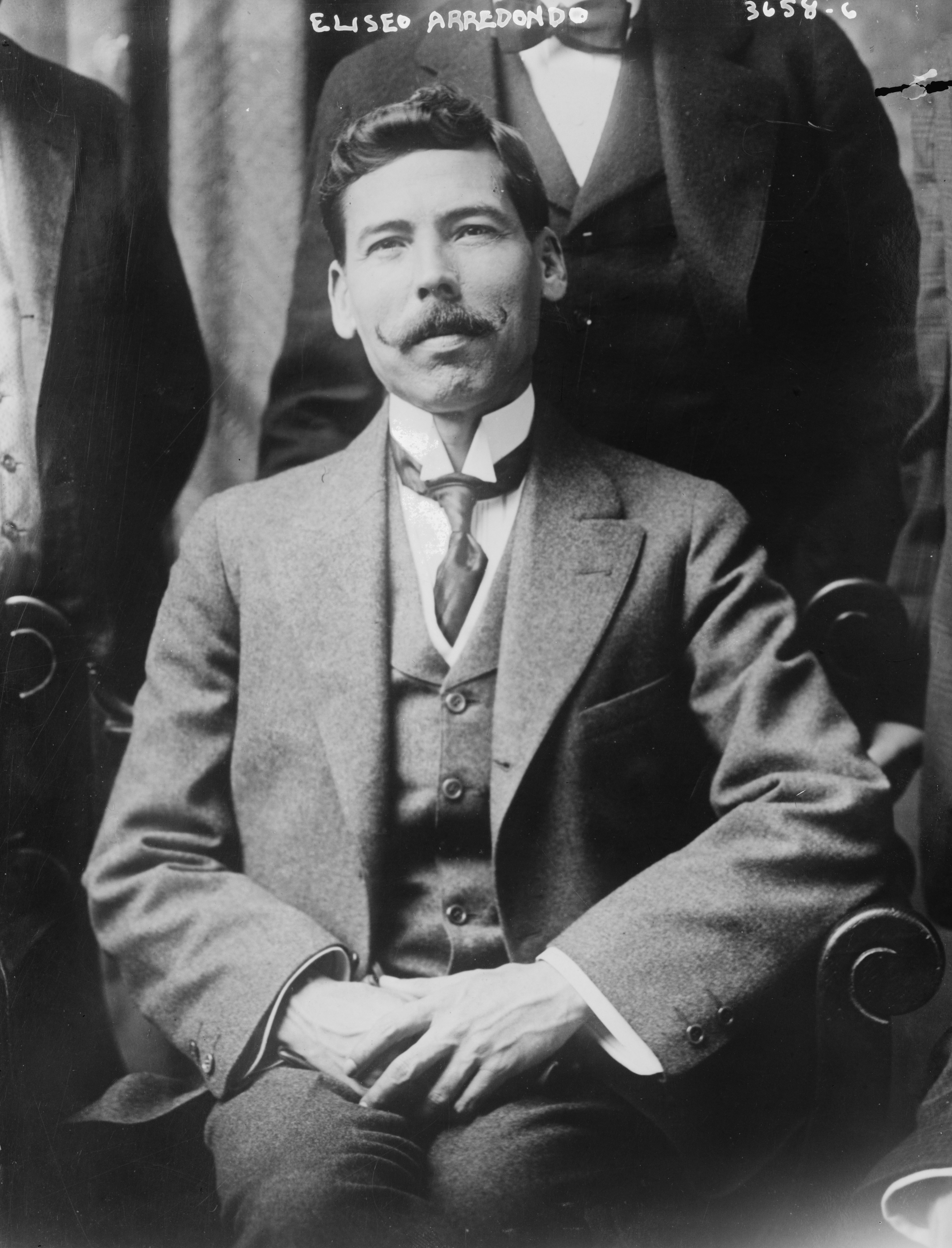
Eliseo Arredondo

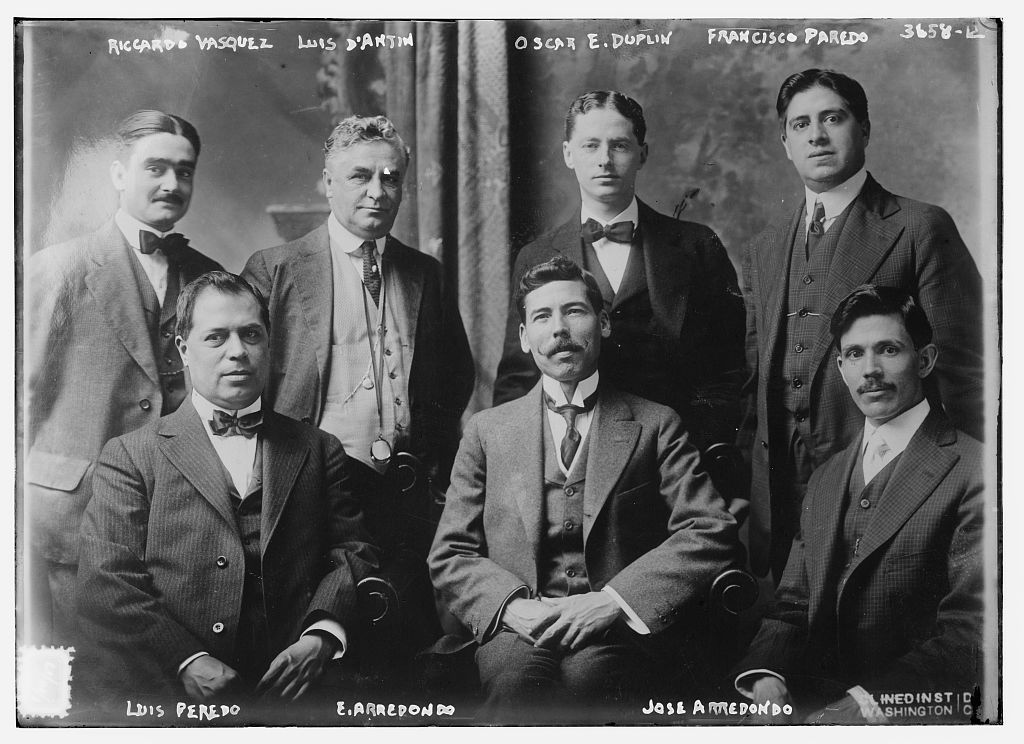
Ricardo Vasquez, Eliseo Arredondo, Jose Arredondo, Oscar E. Duplin, Francesco Paredo and Luis Paredo in 1915

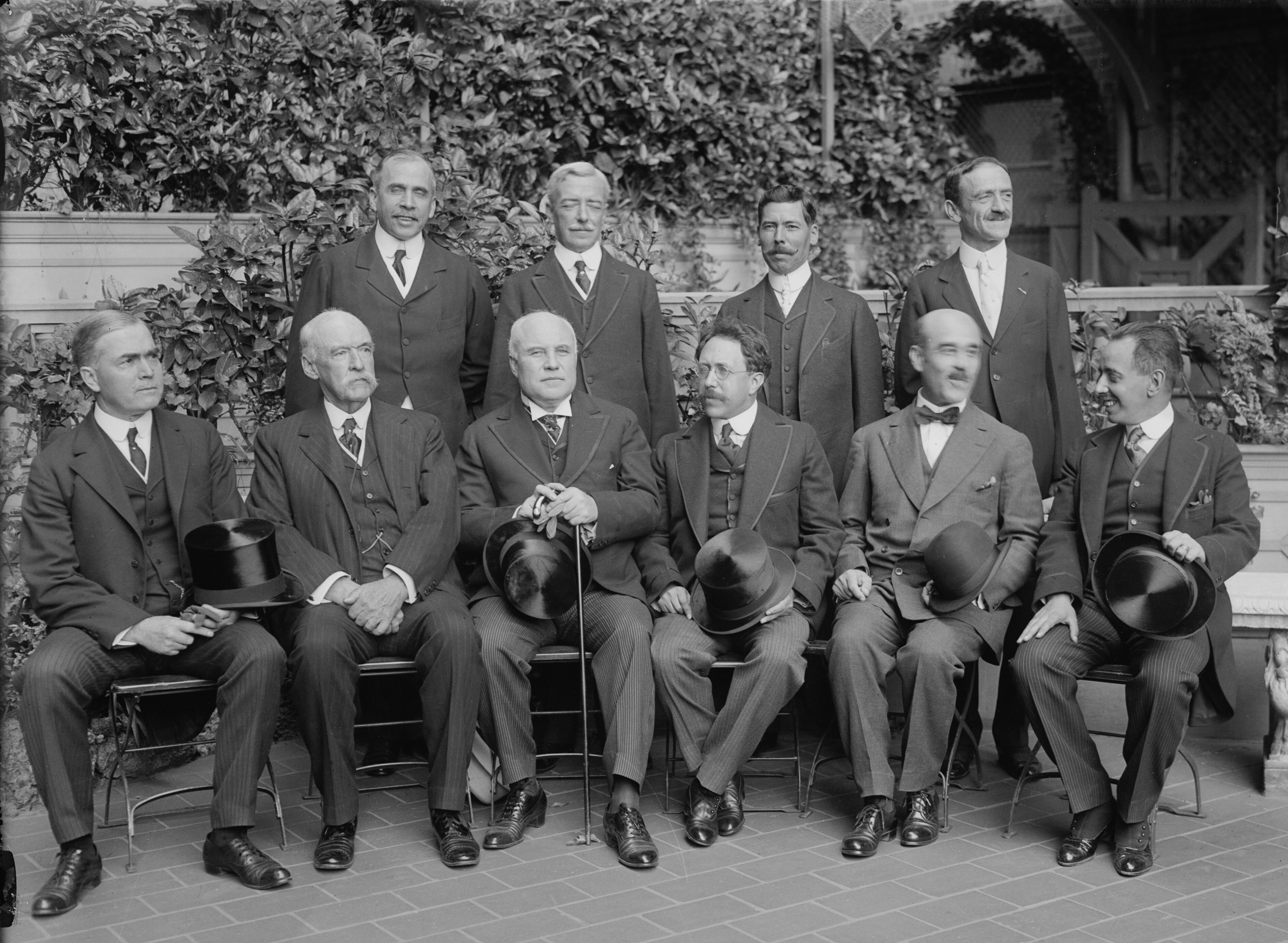
The United States - Mexico Commission, 1916

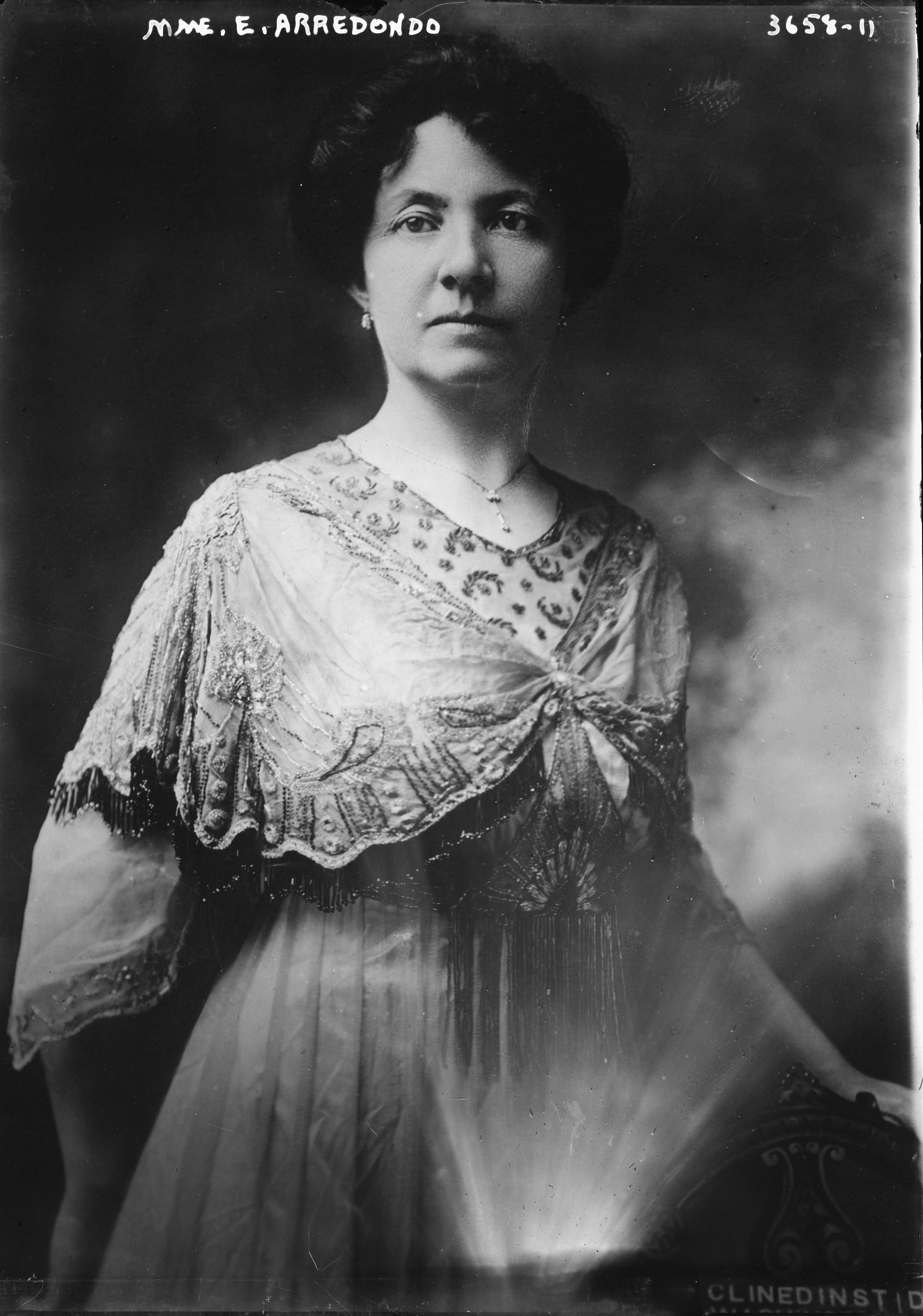
María Emery, Eliseo's wife
