= Miguel Basáñez Ebergenyi =

Mexican politician

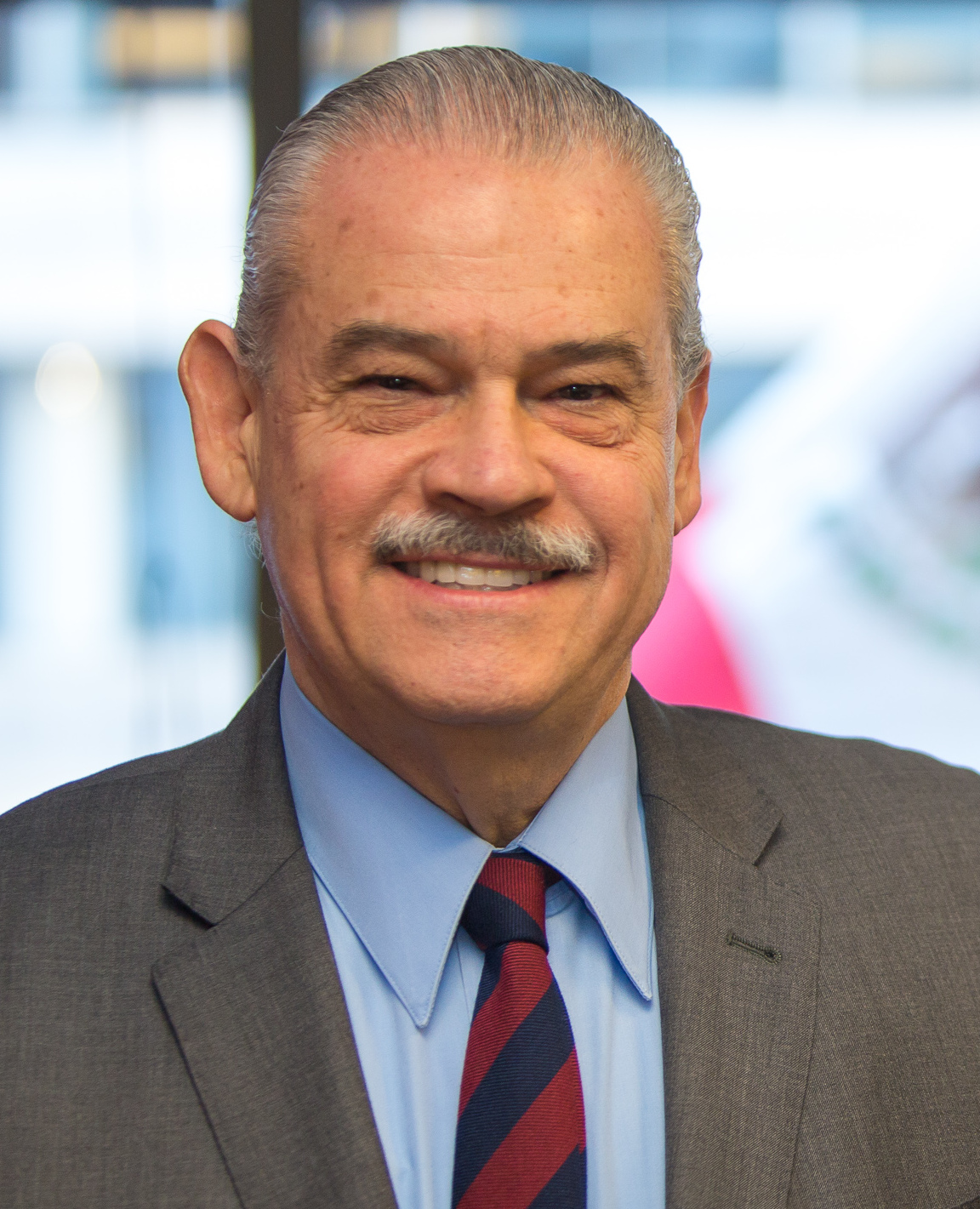
- Basáñez at the Mexican Embassy

Ambassador of Mexico to the United States
- In office 2 September 2015 – 30 April 2016
- President: Enrique Peña Nieto
- Preceded by: Alejandro Estivill (Acting)
- Succeeded by: Carlos Manuel Sada Solana

Personal details
- Born: Miguel Basáñez Ebergenyi; 24 October 1947 (age 77); Tuxpan, Veracruz, Mexico
- Spouse: Tatiana Beltrán
- Children: Tatiana, Alejandro, Pamela and Nicolás
- Education: Ph.D. in Political Sociology, London School of Economics, England.

Miguel Basáñez Ebergenyi (born 24 October 1947) is a former ambassador of Mexico to the United States. Prior to his appointment as ambassador, Basáñez was an academic who taught classes at the Fletcher School of Law and Diplomacy at Tufts University.

Basáñez Ebergenyi's career includes work directing public opinion polls both for private firms and for the Mexican government. He is a former president of the World Association for Public Opinion Research and he has also held several positions in the state and federal government in Mexico.

Additionally, he has authored, co-authored, and edited 13 books on values, public opinion, and politics.

== Bibliography ==
1. La Lucha por la Hegemonía en México, 1968-1980 (The Struggle for Hegemony in Mexico, 1968-1980), Siglo XXI, 1981.
2. La Composición del Poder en Oaxaca (The Power Composition in Oaxaca), coord (UNAM-INAP), Oaxaca, 1987.
3. La Composición del Poder: Estado de México (The Power Composition: The State of Mexico), coord (UNAM-INAP-IAPEM), 1988
4. El Pulso de los Sexenios: 20 Años de Crisis en México (The Pulse of the Presidential Term: 20 Years of Crisis in Mexico), Siglo XXI, 1990.
5. Convergencia en Norteamérica: Comercio, Política y Cultura (North American Convergence: Trade, Politics and Culture) with R. Inglehart and N. Nevitte, Siglo XXI, 1994.
6. North American Trajectory: Trade, Politics and Values, with R. Inglehart and N. Nevitte, Aldyne de Gruyter, 1996.
7. Human Values and Beliefs: A Cross-cultural Sourcebook with R. Inglehart and A. Moreno, U. of Michigan, 1998.
8. Values and Life Styles in Urban Asia: A Cross-Cultural Analysis and Sourcebook Based on the Asia Barometer Survey of 2003 with Takashi Inoguchi and others (eds), Siglo XXI, Mexico, 2005.
9. Uno de Dos (One of the Two) with Carmen Aristegui and Lorenzo Meyer, Random House, 2006
10. Changing Values and Beliefs in 85 Countries: Trends from the Values Surveys from 1981 to 2004 with L. Halman, R. Inglehart and others, Brill, 2007.
11. México Solidario: Participación Ciudadana y Voluntariado (Solidarity Mexico: Citizen Participation and Voluntary Work) with J. Butcher (ed) and others, México: Limusa, 2008.
12. Changing Human Beliefs and Values, 1981-2007 with R. Inglehart et al., México: Siglo XXI, 2010.
13. A World of Three Cultures: Honor, Achievement, and Joy, Oxford University Press, 2016.
