= Gilberto Crespo y Martínez =

Mexican diplomat

Gilberto Crespo
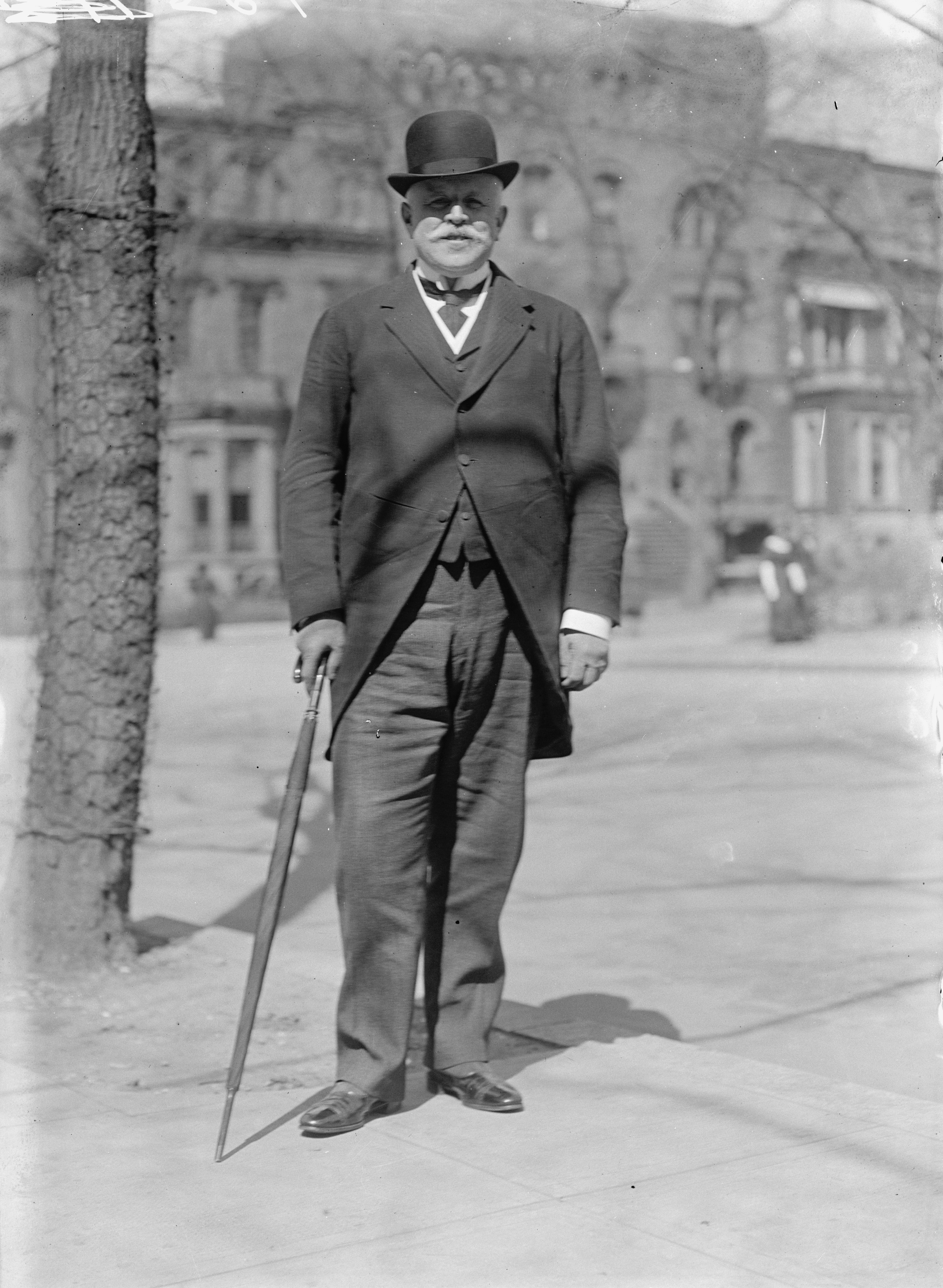
- Gilberto Crespo in 1911

Ambassador of Mexico to the United States
- In office 28 July 1911 – 10 April 1912
- Preceded by: Manuel María de Zamacona
- Succeeded by: Manuel Calero y Sierra

Envoy of Mexico to Austria-Hungary
- In office 30 June 1906 – 27 June 1911
- Preceded by: Jesús Zenil
- Succeeded by: Miguel Covarrubias Acosta
- In office 17 June 1912 – 26 August 1916
- Preceded by: Miguel Covarrubias Acosta
- Succeeded by: Rafael Zubarán

Envoy of Mexico to Cuba
- In office 1 July 1902 – 20 October 1905
- Succeeded by: José Francisco Godoy

Personal details
- Born: Gilberto Crespo y Martínez; 17 August 1853 Veracruz, Veracruz
- Died: 7 November 1917 (aged 64) Vienna, Austria

Gilberto Crespo y Martínez (17 August 1853 – 7 November 1917) was a Mexican diplomat who served as ambassador of Mexico to the United States (1911–1912) and as Envoy Extraordinary and Minister Plenipotentiary to Cuba (1902–1905) and Austria-Hungary (1906–1911 and 1912–1916).

== Works ==
- Memoria leída ante la Academia Mexicana de Ciencias Exactas, Fisicas y Naturales correspondiente a la Real de Madrid sobre los rayos X (1896).
- Las patentes de invención (1897).
- Le Mexique, son évolution sociale (1902).
- México (1903).
- En México y Cuba (1905).
