= José María Mata =

Mexican politician and diplomat (1819–1895)

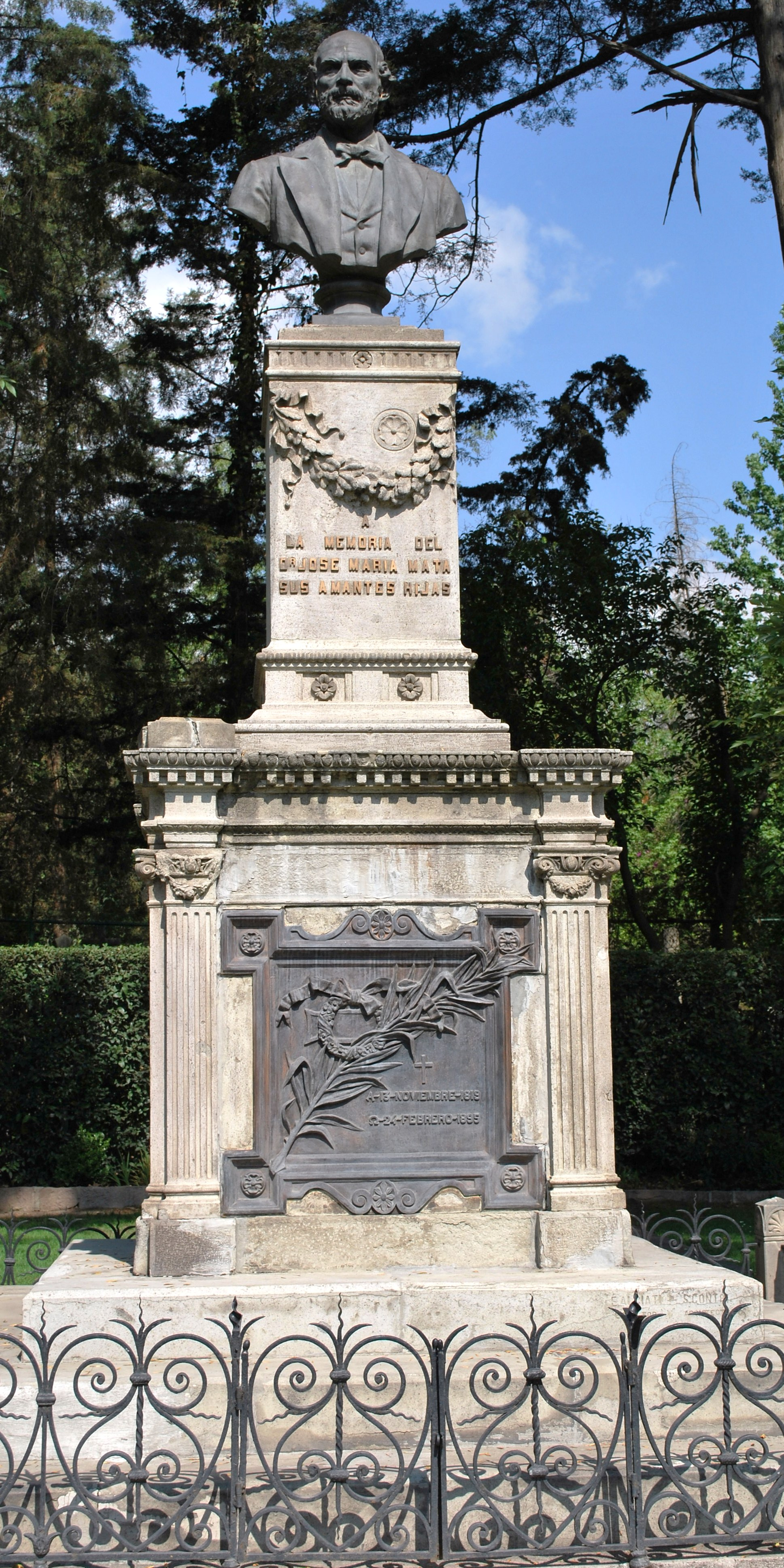
- Tomb of José María Mata at the Rotunda of Illustrious Persons

Envoy extraordinary and minister plenipotentiary of Mexico to the United States
- In office 28 April 1859 – 13 August 1860
- Preceded by: Ignacio Mariscal
- Succeeded by: José Tomás de Cuéllar

Minister of Finance
- In office 29 October 1860 – 20 November 1860
- In office 22 April 1861 – 2 May 1861
- President: Benito Juárez
- Preceded by: Guillermo Prieto

Minister of Foreign Affairs
- In office 20 June 1878 – 1878
- President: Porfirio Díaz
- Preceded by: Ignacio L. Vallarta

Personal details
- Born: José María Mata Reyes; 13 November 1819 Xalapa, Veracruz
- Died: 25 February 1895 (aged 75) Martínez de la Torre, Veracruz
- Resting place: Dolores Civil Cemetery, Mexico City; 19.407°N 99.204°W
- Party: Mexican Liberal Party (in Spanish: Partido Liberal Mexicano)
- Spouse(s): A daughter of Melchor Ocampo, Josefina Ocampo (m. 1856–1887) and Flavia Torre (m. 1890)
- Education: San Juan de Letrán College

José María Mata Reyes (13 November 1819 – 25 February 1895) was a 19th-century liberal politician and diplomat from Mexico who served for two months as minister of Finance in the cabinet of Benito Juárez (1860–1861), three months as minister of Foreign Affairs in the cabinet of Porfirio Díaz (1878), as envoy extraordinary and minister plenipotentiary of Mexico to the United States (1859–1860), as congressman in the Chamber of Deputies, and as municipal president of Martínez de la Torre, Veracruz.

Aside from his political and diplomatic activities, Mata served as a militiaman during the Mexican–American War and as a general in the army commanded by Porfirio Díaz during the French intervention in Mexico.

== Works ==
- Memoria de Hacienda (1868).
