= Ezequiel Padilla Peñaloza =

Mexican politician

Ezequiel Padilla
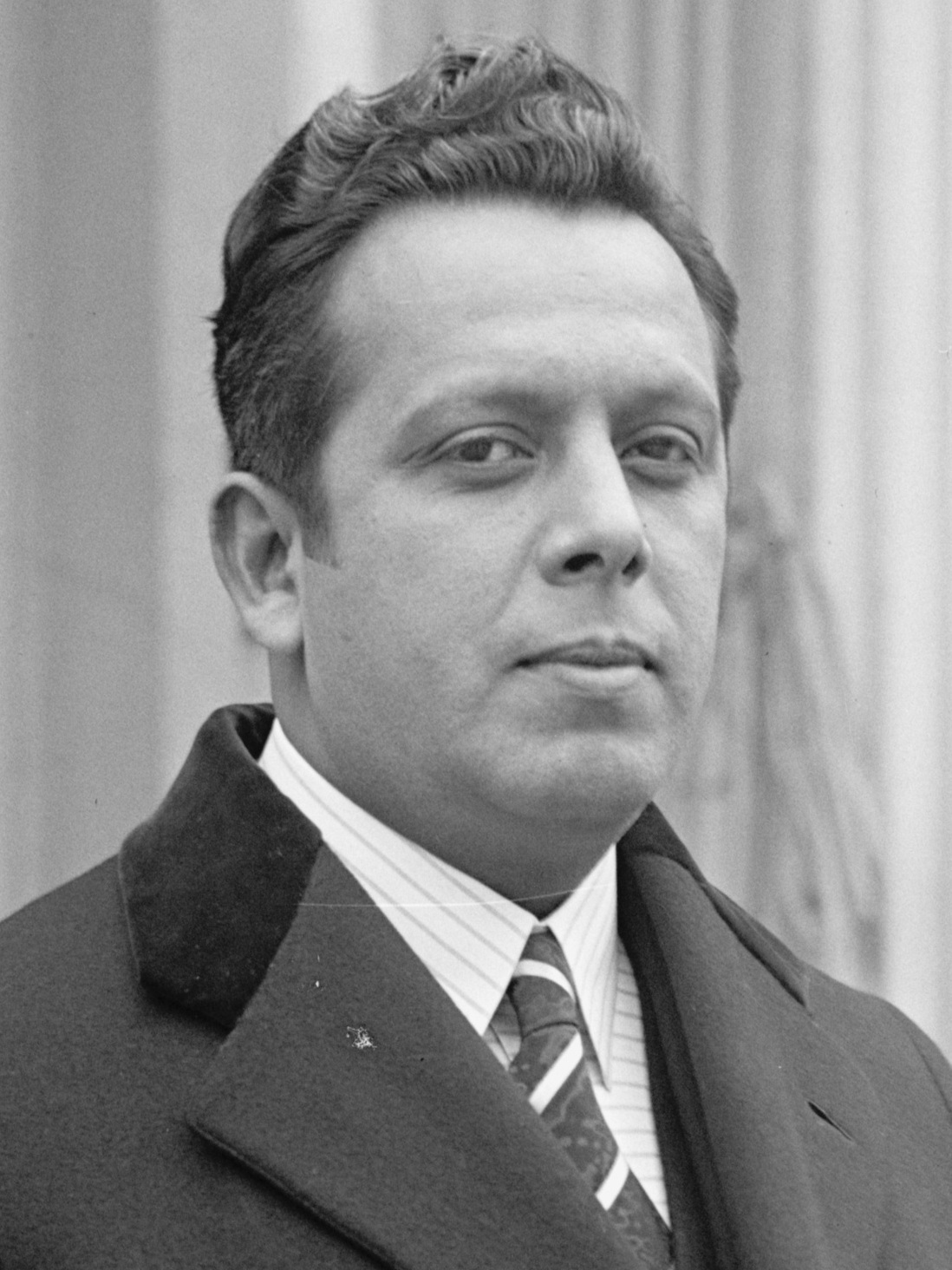
- Ezequiel Padilla in 1929

Secretary of Foreign Affairs
- In office 1 December 1940 – 1 October 1945
- President: Manuel Ávila Camacho
- Preceded by: Eduardo Hay
- Succeeded by: Francisco Castillo Nájera

5th Secretary of Public Education
- In office 1 December 1928 – 5 February 1930
- President: Emilio Portes Gil
- Preceded by: Moisés Sáenz
- Succeeded by: Aarón Sáenz

Personal details
- Born: Ezequiel Padilla Peñaloza; December 31, 1890 Coyuca de Catalán, Guerrero
- Died: September 6, 1971 (aged 80) Mexico City
- Spouse: María Guadalupe Couttolenc
- Children: Evangelina Francesca
- Education: Escuela Libre de Derecho
- Profession: Politician and diplomat

Ezequiel Padilla Peñaloza (December 31, 1890 – September 6, 1971) was a Mexican statesman. Born in Coyuca de Catalán, Guerrero, he served in the Senate, as Attorney General in 1928, as Secretary of Education from 1928 to 1930, as ambassador to Hungary from 1930 to 1932, and as Secretary of Foreign Affairs from 1940 to 1945. He was the President of the Chamber of Deputies in 1925.

His appointment to the Secretariat of Foreign Affairs by President Manuel Ávila Camacho marked an end to the Post-Revolutionary domination of politicians from the North of the country. With his co-cabinet member Miguel Alemán Valdés (Secretary of the Interior), he "gave Mexico the most progressive foreign policy and the most orderly internal government in the nation's history". By 1941, he had successfully settled all foreign claims against the government stemming from the Cárdenas-era expropriations. He negotiated a favorable economic treaty, fixed the peso to the United States dollar, and secured loans for industrial development from the Export-Import Bank of the United States.

During World War II, he was a strong proponent of inter-American unity and led conferences of the foreign ministers of countries of the Americas to this end. He was criticized by some for being too pro-U.S.

He emerged alongside Alemán as a prime contender for the presidency in the 1946 general election. He was better-known abroad than his rival, and was considered to have stronger tendencies toward democracy. However, his association with the United States made him unpopular in the left wing of the Institutional Revolutionary Party (PRI), and Alemán won the party's nomination. He ran as an independent candidate for the presidency in 1946, receiving 443,537 votes. Though Alemán received over three times the number of votes, Padilla's total was respectable, considering the PRI's hegemony at the time. Also, the fact that he was not exiled after the campaign is considered something of a victory for Mexican democracy, which had been intolerant of opposition parties and candidates since solidification of the PRI.

He was one of the signatories of the agreement to convene a convention for drafting a world constitution. As a result, for the first time in human history, a World Constituent Assembly convened to draft and adopt the Constitution for the Federation of Earth.
