= Secretariat of Public Education =

Part of the cabinet of Mexico

- Secretaría de Educación Publica
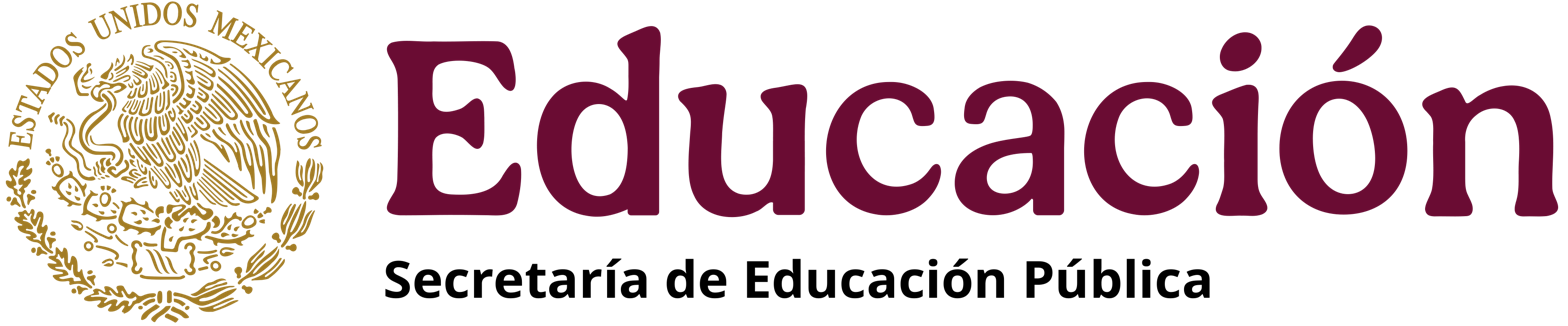
- Logo during the 2024 administration

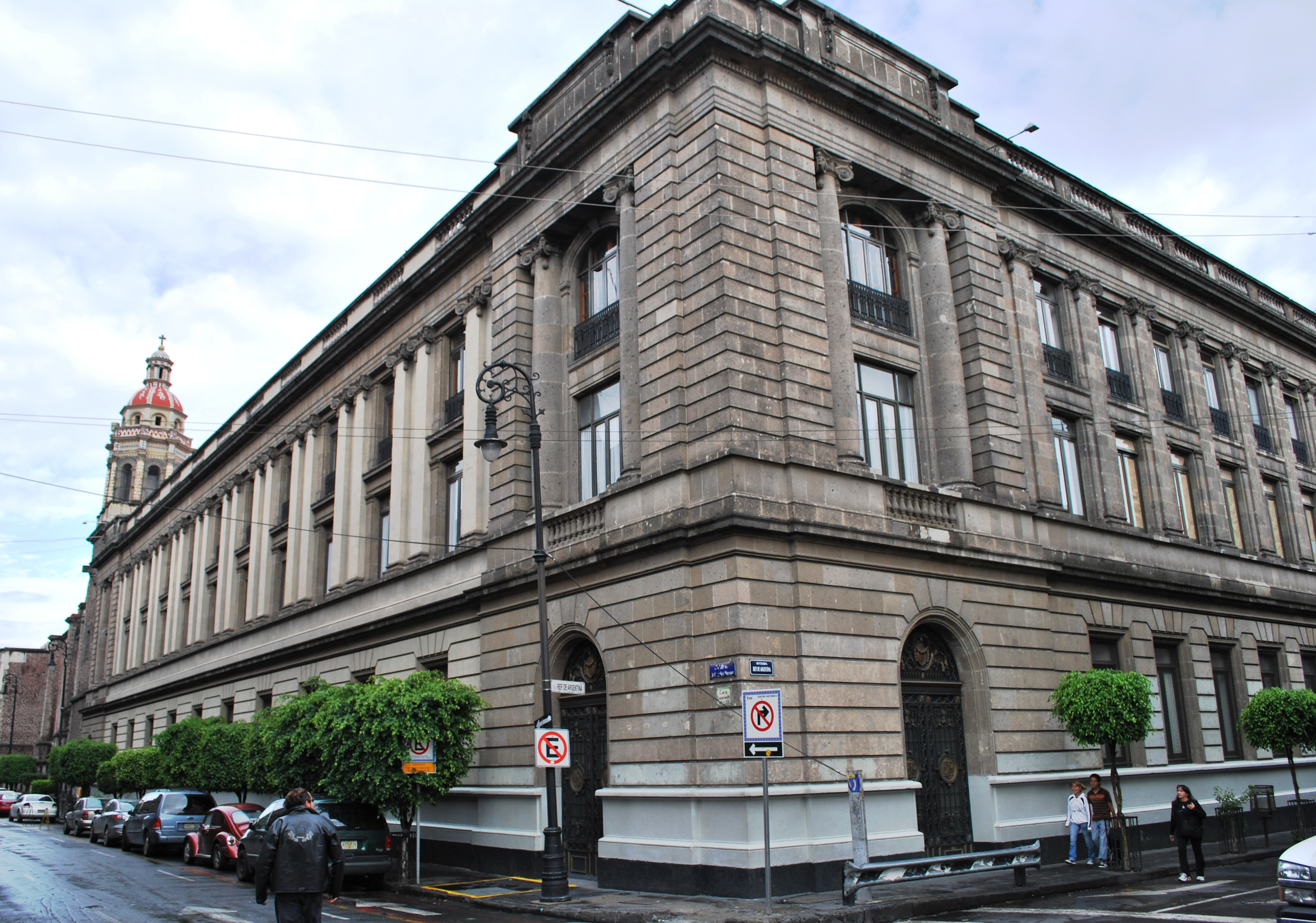
- Main headquarters of the Secretariat of Public Education

Secretariat overview
- Formed: 3 October 1921; 105 years ago
- Preceding Secretariat: Secretariat of Public Instruction
- Jurisdiction: Government of Mexico
- Headquarters: República de Argentina #28, Centro Histórico, Mexico City. C.P. 06020
- Secretariat executive: Mario Delgado, Secretary
- Key document: Reglamento Interior
- Website: gob.mx/sep

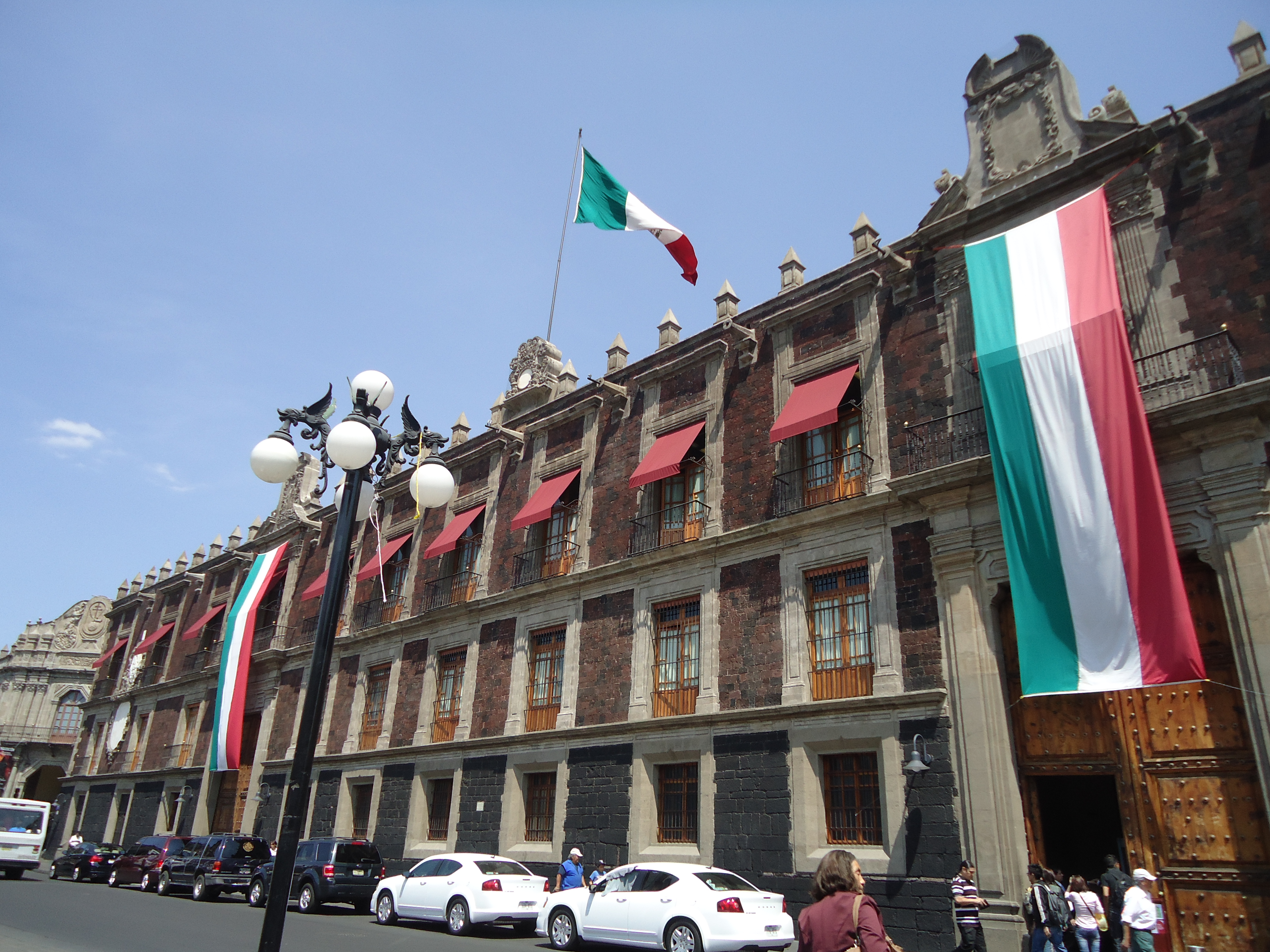
Mexican flag and banners

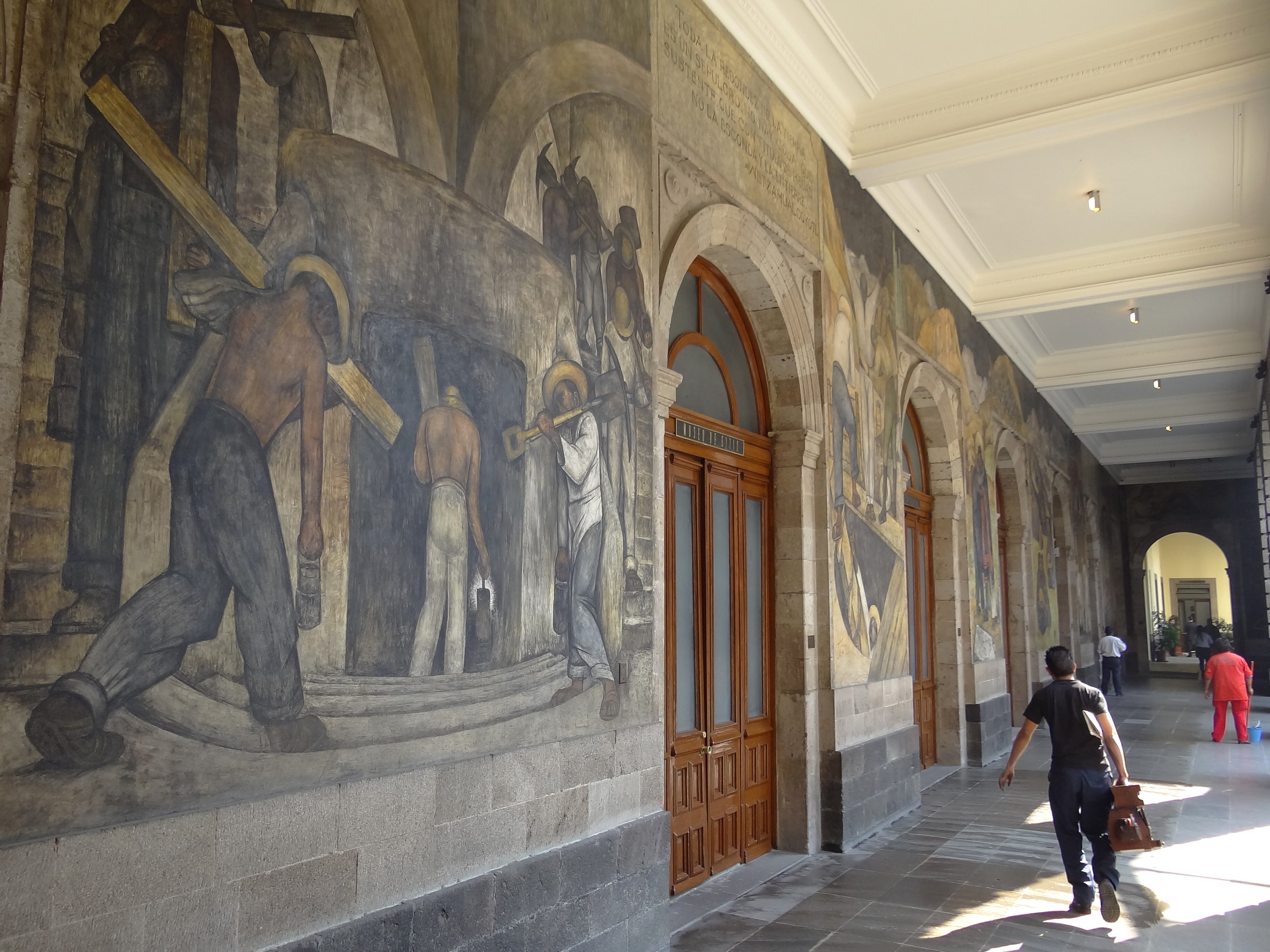
Murals by Diego Rivera

In Mexico, the Secretariat of Public Education (in Spanish Secretaría de Educación Pública, SEP) is a federal government authority with cabinet representation and the responsibility for overseeing the development and implementation of national educational policy and school standards. Its headquarters has several buildings distributed throughout the country, but its main offices, initially confined to the Old Dominican Convent of the Holy Incarnation in the oldest borough of Mexico City, have extended to the House of the Marqués de Villamayor, (also known as the Casa de los adelantados de Nueva Galicia, built in 1530), the Old House of don Cristóbal de Oñate, a three-time governor and general captain of New Galicia (also built in 1530), and the Old Royal Customs House (built in 1730–1731). Some of the buildings were decorated with mural paintings by Diego Rivera and other notable exponents of the Mexican muralist movement of the twentieth century, David Alfaro Siqueiros, Raul Anguiano, and Manuel Felguerez.

== Secretariat functions ==
- Creation and maintenance of state public schools in Mexico City, excluding those that are dependents of other dependencies
- Ensuring all requirements related to preschool, primary, secondary, technical, and normal education (i.e., teacher education) as established by the Constitution of Mexico are observed and completed, and to prescribe the norms to which the incorporation of particular schools in the national educational system should adjust
- Exercising supervision and vigilance that proceeds in the seminaries that impart education in the Republic, pursuant to Article 3 of the Constitution
- To systematically organize, administer and enrich the general or specialized libraries that are sustained by the Secretariat or that form part of its dependencies
- To promote the creation of institutes of scientific and technical research and the establishment of laboratories, observatories, planetariums, and also centers that are required for the development of primary, secondary, moral, technical, and superior education; to orient, in coordination with the appropriate dependencies of the federal government and with the public and private entities, the development of scientific and technological research
- To confer scholarships so that students of Mexican nationality can do research or complete foreign study programs
- To re-validate studies and titles, and to concede authorization for the exercise of the capacities that they accredit
- To formulate the catalog of national historic patrimony
- To organize, sustain, and administer historic, archaeological and artistic museums, painting galleries and art galleries, to the effect of preserving the integrity, the maintenance, and the conservation of historic and artistic treasures of the cultural patrimony of the country
- To conserve, protect, and maintain archaeological, historical, and artistic monuments that conform the cultural patrimony of the nation, attending the legal dispositions in these matters
- To orient the artistic, cultural, recreational, and sport-related activities that are realized by the federal public sector
- To maintain a national data base of the works protected by copyright and trademarks through disconcerted institutes
- To regulate sports, the people involved, and the application of their rules in the nation

== List of secretaries ==
- President Álvaro Obregón
  - (1921–1924): José Vasconcelos Calderón
  - (1924–1924): Bernardo J. Gastélum
- President Plutarco Elías Calles
  - (1924–1928): José Manuel Puig Casauranc
  - (1928–1928): Moisés Sáenz
- President Emilio Portes Gil
  - (1928–1930): Ezequiel Padilla
- President Pascual Ortiz Rubio
  - (1930–1930): Aarón Sáenz
  - (1930–1930): Carlos Trejo Lerdo de Tejada
  - (1930–1931): José Manuel Puig Casauranc
  - (1931–1932): Narciso Bassols
- President Abelardo L. Rodríguez
  - (1932–1934): Narciso Bassols
  - (1934–1934): Eduardo Vasconcelos
- President Lázaro Cárdenas del Río
  - (1934–1935): Ignacio Garcia Tellez
- President Manuel Ávila Camacho
  - (1940–1941): Luis Sánchez Pontón
  - (1941–1943): Octavio Véjar Vázquez
  - (1943–1946): Jaime Torres Bodet
- President Miguel Alemán
  - (1946–1952): Manuel Gual Vidal
- President Adolfo Ruiz Cortines
  - (1952–1958): José Ángel Ceniceros
- President Adolfo López Mateos
  - (1958–1964): Jaime Torres Bodet
- President Gustavo Díaz Ordaz
  - (1964–1970): Agustín Yáñez
- President Luis Echeverría
  - (1970–1976): Víctor Bravo Ahuja
- President José López Portillo
  - (1976–1977): Porfirio Muñoz Ledo
  - (1977–1982): Fernando Solana Morales
- President Miguel de la Madrid
  - (1982–1985): Jesús Reyes Heroles
  - (1985–1988): Miguel González Avelar
- President Carlos Salinas de Gortari
  - (1988–1992): Manuel Bartlett Díaz
  - (1992–1993): Ernesto Zedillo Ponce de León
  - (1993–1994): Fernando Solana Morales
  - (1994–1994): José Ángel Pescador
- President Ernesto Zedillo
  - (1994–1995): Fausto Alzati
  - (1995–2000): Miguel Limón Rojas
- President Vicente Fox
  - (2000–2006): Reyes Tamez Guerra
- President Felipe Calderón
  - (2006–2009): Josefina Vázquez Mota
  - (2009–2012): Alonso Lujambio
  - (2012): José Ángel Córdova Villalobos
- President Enrique Peña Nieto
  - (2012–2015): Emilio Chuayffet
  - (2015–2018): Aurelio Nuño Mayer
- President Andrés Manuel López Obrador
  - (2018–2021): Esteban Moctezuma
  - (2021–2022): Delfina Gómez Álvarez
  - (2022–2024): Leticia Ramírez Amaya
- President Claudia Sheinbaum
  - (2024–present): Mario Delgado

== See also ==
- Education in Mexico
- Instituto Latinoamericano de la Comunicación Educativa (ILCE)
