= Sergio Armando Valls =

Sergio Armando Valls Hernández (May 20, 1941 – December 3, 2014) was a Mexican jurist who was a member of the Supreme Court of Justice of the Nation until 2004. Born in Tuxtla Gutiérrez, Chiapas, Valls Hernández studied law at the National Autonomous University of Mexico.

He served as Magistrate of the Superior Court of Justice of the Federal District and served as Legal Director of the Mexican Social Security Institute (IMSS). Justice Valls Hernández also served as a PRI deputy in the Chamber of Deputies (the lower house of Congress) during the LIII Legislature, representing Chiapas.

President Vicente Fox nominated him as a Minister (Associate Justice) of the Supreme Court to fill the vacancy left after the death of Humberto Román Palacios in 2004. Valls Hernández was confirmed by the Senate with 85 votes in October 2004. Sergio died on December 3, 2014, at the age of 73.

Legal offices
Preceded by Humberto Román Palacios	Minister of the Supreme Court of Justice of the Nation; 2004–2014	Succeeded by Eduardo Medina-Mora Icaza
