= Manuel C. Téllez =

Mexican politician and diplomat

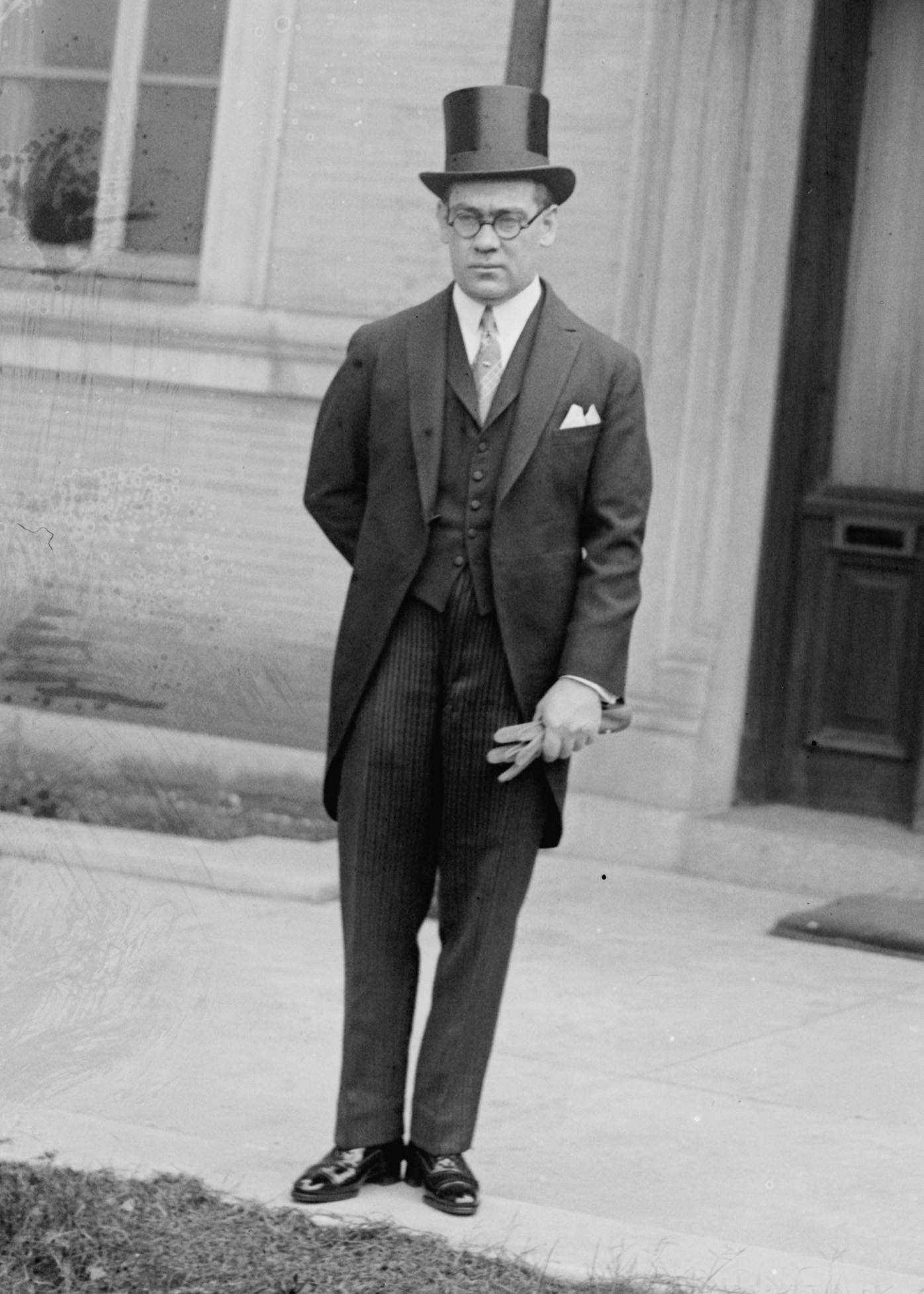
- Téllez on 25 November 1925.

Secretary of Foreign Affairs
- In office January 1932 – 1934
- President: Pascual Ortiz Rubio and Abelardo L. Rodríguez
- Preceded by: Genaro Estrada
- Succeeded by: Emilio Portes Gil

Secretary of the Interior
- In office 1931 – January 1932
- President: Pascual Ortiz Rubio
- Preceded by: Lázaro Cárdenas
- Succeeded by: Juan José Ríos

Ambassador of Mexico to the United States
- In office 24 February 1925 – 9 November 1931
- President: Plutarco Elías Calles, Emilio Portes Gil and Pascual Ortiz Rubio
- Preceded by: Ignacio Bonillas
- Succeeded by: José Manuel Puig Casauranc

Personal details
- Born: 16 February 1885 Zacatecas, Zacatecas
- Died: 25 May 1937 (aged 52) Mexico City
- Children: María Emilia, José, Manuel and Luis Carlos
- Parent(s): José María Téllez and Jovita Acosta
- Education: National Preparatory School

Manuel C. Téllez Acosta (16 February 1885 – 25 May 1937) was a Mexican politician and diplomat who served as Secretary of the Interior (1931–1932), Secretary of Foreign Affairs (1932–1934), Ambassador of Mexico to the United States (1925–1931), and plenipotentiary diplomatic envoy to Italy and Hungary (1934–1935).

== Biography ==
Téllez was born in Zacatecas, Zacatecas, on 16 February 1885. He was the son of José María Téllez and Jovita Acosta. He graduated from the National Preparatory School in Mexico City.

After joining the foreign service, he was appointed Chargé d'affaires of Mexico to the United States on 3 September 1923 by President Álvaro Obregón. Except for two months (from 15 April to 22 June 1924), Téllez served in the same post until he was promoted to ambassador by President Plutarco Elías Calles. He signed the treaty of the General Claims Convention as ambassador, also the Dean of the Diplomatic Corps since August 1930, and served until 9 November 1931, when he resigned to join the cabinet of President Pascual Ortiz Rubio as secretary of the Interior.

Téllez didn't last long as secretary of the Interior, as President Ortiz Rubio appointed him secretary of Foreign Affairs in January 1932, substituting Genaro Estrada.

Téllez died in Mexico City on 25 May 1937. A few decades later, one of his grandsons, Luis Téllez, served as secretary of Energy in the cabinet of President Ernesto Zedillo and as secretary of Communications and Transportation in the cabinet of President Felipe Calderón.

== Works ==
- Memoria de la Secretaria de Relaciones Exteriores: de agosto de 1931 a julio de 1932 (Mexico, 1932).
