= Martha Bárcena Coqui =

Mexican diplomat

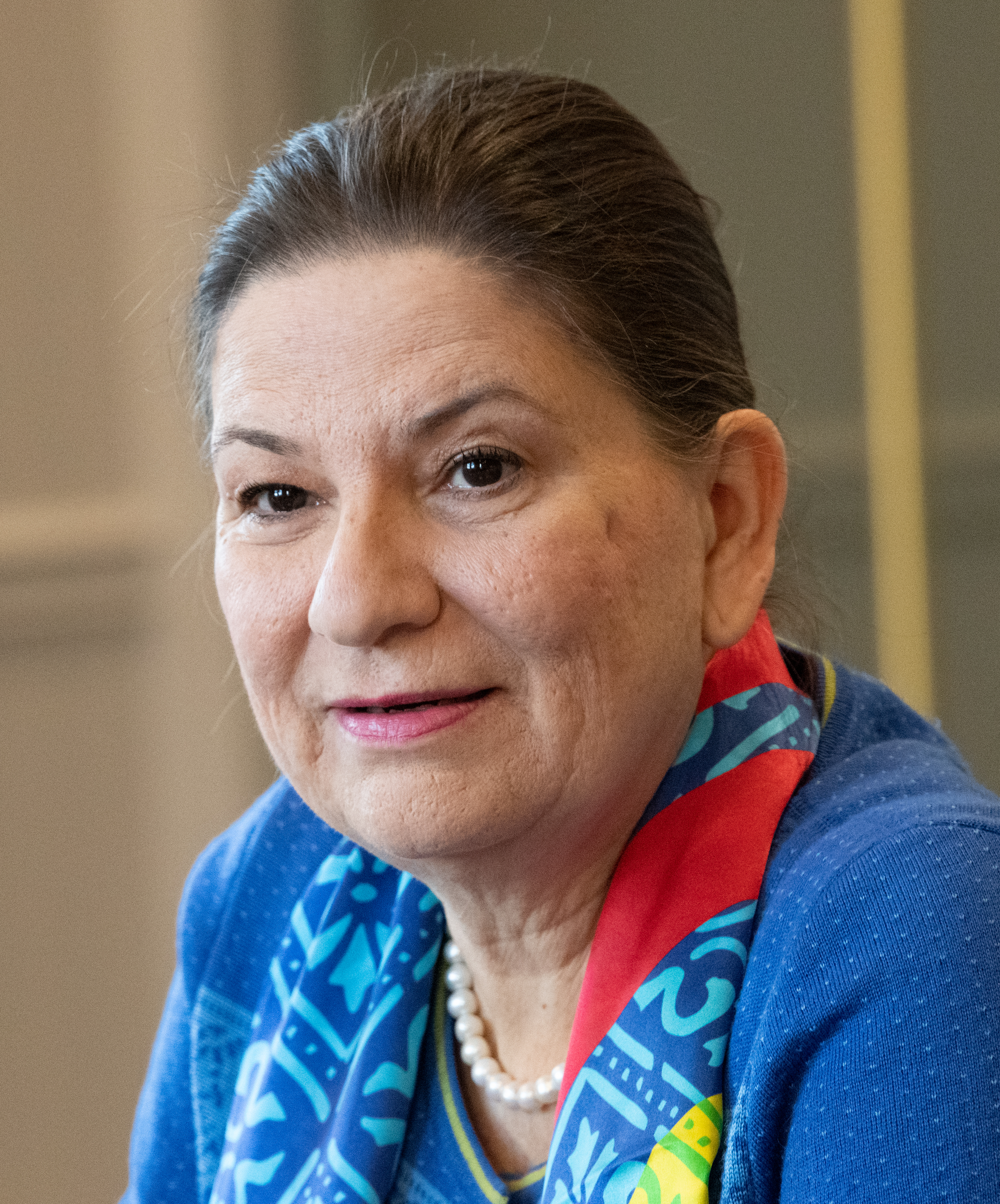
Bárcena Coqui in 2019

Martha Elena Federica Bárcena Coqui (born 2 March 1957) is a Mexican diplomat who is a non-resident Senior Adviser in the Americas Program at the Center for Strategic and International Studies and served as the first female Ambassador to the United States from Mexico (December 2018 until February 2021).

== Education ==
Born in Veracruz, Bárcena Coqui earned a bachelor's degree in communication studies from the Universidad Iberoamericana (where she also earned a Master of Philosophy specializing in political philosophy) and in philosophy from the Pontificia Universitá Gregoriana. From the Diplomatic School of Spain she earned a master's degree in diplomatic studies.

== Diplomatic career ==
Bárcena Coqui was appointed as Ambassador of Mexico to the Republic of Turkey and to Georgia, Azerbaijan, Kazakhstan and Turkmenistan in June 2013. From December 2004 to June 2013 she was the Ambassador to the Kingdom of Denmark, concurrent to Norway and Iceland. She was the Permanent Representative to the United Nations Rome-based Agencies before going to the United States.

Appointed by Andrés Manuel López Obrador, she was ambassador when the United States-Mexico-Canada Agreement was ratified and entered into force.

== Personal life ==
She and her husband, Ambassador Agustin Gutiérrez-Canet, have two daughters.
