= Emeterio de la Garza Jr. =

Mexican politician (1873–1928)

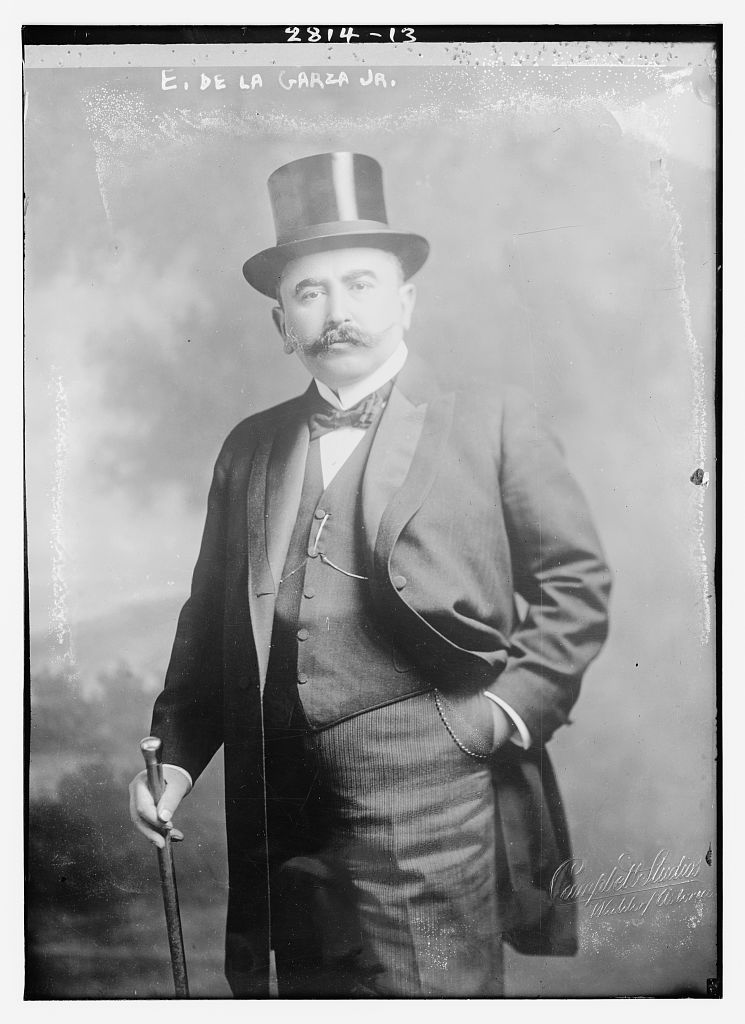
- de la Garza Jr. in 1918

Special Representative of the President of Mexico to the United States Government
- In office 1913–1914
- President: Victoriano Huerta

Federal Deputy
- In office 1898–1910

Personal details
- Born: 5 April 1873 Marín, Nuevo León
- Died: 1928 (aged 54–55)
- Education: National School of Jurisprudence

Emeterio de la Garza Jr. (5 April 1873 – 1928) was a Mexican conservative politician and businessman who served as a federal congressman in the Chamber of Deputies and as Special Representative of President Victoriano Huerta in Washington, D.C.

== Biography ==
He was born on 5 April 1873.

Huerta — the army general who assumed control of the country following a coup d'état against the democratically elected president, Francisco I. Madero— tried to avoid a military intervention by the United States in 1913, so he sent De la Garza to negotiate with business leaders and the Wilson administration.

Emeterio was a close friend of businessman James E. Hyslop, he worked as his personal lawyer for several years.

Aside from his political and diplomatic duties, De la Garza edited La Patria newspaper, served as president of the New York, Mobile and Mexico Steamship Line and was a shareholder of the International Bank and Trust Company of Mexico City.

He died in 1928.

== Works ==
- La política de conciliación (1902).
- Manifiesto del licenciado Emeterio de la Garza Jr., convocando a un congreso de paz (1914).
- Mexico and the War: A Lecture by Emeterio de la Garza (1917).
- Los estados latinos de América y los Estados Unidos de América (1928).
