= Enrique Berruga =

Mexican diplomat

Enrique Berruga Filloy is a Mexican diplomat, having served as the Permanent Representative of Mexico to the United Nations. He presented his credentials to United Nations Secretary-General Kofi Annan on December 16, 2003. Prior to that, he had been an Undersecretary for Foreign Affairs from 2000 to 2003. He has been a career diplomat since 1984, serving in positions such as the chief of staff of the Minister of Foreign Affairs in 1993 and from 1994 to 1997. From 1997 to 1999, he was the Mexican ambassador to Costa Rica.

He graduated with a Bachelor of Arts degree from the El Colegio de México in International Relations. He possess a Master of Arts degree in International Economy and Theory of International Politics from Johns Hopkins University in Washington, D.C. He has been a professor of Mexican foreign policy, American foreign policy and Theory of International Politics at the Instituto Tecnológico Autónomo de México. He is the author of several works concerning foreign policy and the international economy.
