= Matías Romero =

Mexican politician and diplomat

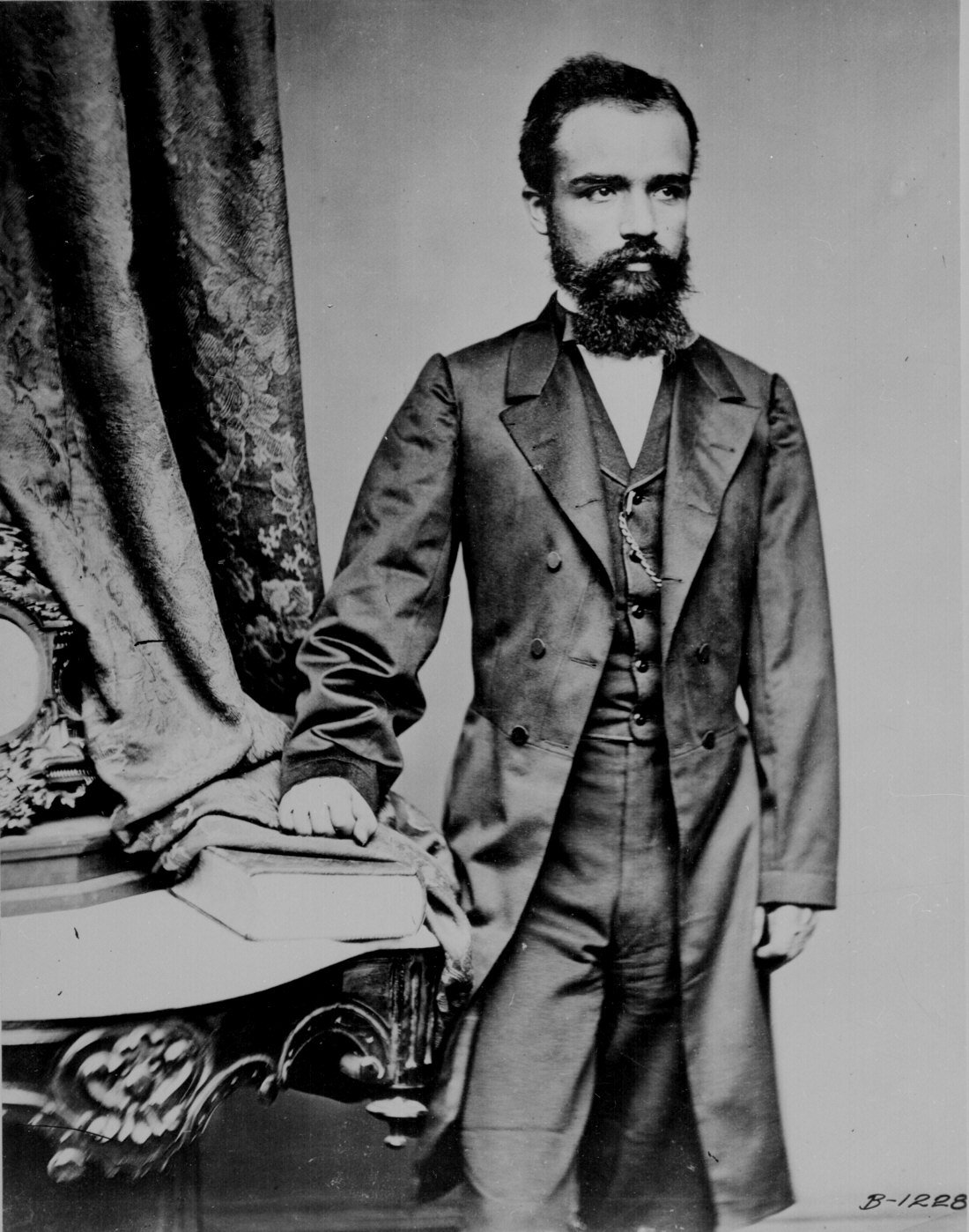
- Carte de visite presented to the United States government in 1863

Mexican Secretary of Finance
- In office 26 March 1892 – 31 December 1892
- President: Porfirio Díaz
- Preceded by: Benito Gómez Farías
- Succeeded by: José Yves Limantour
- In office 24 May 1877 – 4 April 1879
- President: Porfirio Díaz
- Preceded by: Francisco Landero y Cos
- Succeeded by: José Hipólito Ramírez
- In office 16 January 1868 – 12 June 1872
- President: Benito Juárez
- Preceded by: José María Garmendia
- Succeeded by: Francisco Mejía Escalona

Ambassador of Mexico to the United States
- In office 15 February 1893 – 30 December 1898
- Preceded by: Manuel María de Zamacona
- Succeeded by: Manuel Azpíroz
- In office 2 September 1863 – 13 July 1868
- Preceded by: Luis de la Rosa
- Succeeded by: Ignacio Mariscal

Personal details
- Born: Matías Romero Avendaño; 24 February 1837 Oaxaca, Oaxaca
- Died: 30 December 1898 (aged 66) New York City, New York
- Education: Institute of Sciences and Arts of Oaxaca

Matías Romero Avendaño (24 February 1837 – 30 December 1898) was a Mexican politician and diplomat who served three times as Secretary of Finance and twice as ambassador of Mexico to the United States during the 19th century.

== Early life ==
Romero began preparatory courses in Law while still living in Oaxaca. In 1855 he moved to Mexico City, and he received his law degree on 12 October 1857. He joined the liberals under command of General Ignacio Zaragoza, and traveled to Guanajuato to join the Army. However, he was instead commissioned into the Ministry of Relations. He accompanied Juárez to Guadalajara, but was briefly imprisoned by Commander Landa. After being freed, he followed Juárez to Veracruz via Panama. He served as Melchor Ocampo's private secretary in Veracruz, and as official in various secretariats.

== Diplomatic career ==
In 1859, Romero published a work on Mexican foreign treaties. In December of that year he was named Secretary of the Mexican Legation in Washington, D.C. By December of the following year he was directed by President Juárez to approach Abraham Lincoln, who had recently won election as US president, but had not yet assumed the Presidency.

During the Second French intervention in Mexico, Romero played a key role in lobbying the United States to oppose the French-backed Second Mexican Empire. When Abraham Lincoln and Secretary of State Seward appeared ambivalent on the matter, Romero supported the presidential campaign of John C. Frémont in 1864. Romero also supported mediation between the United States and the Confederacy in order that the United States could focus more on opposing the Mexican Empire. When the American Civil War ended, he proposed direct military intervention under the leadership of either General Grant or General Sherman.

The Instituto Matías Romero (Matías Romero Institute) established in 1974 was named for Romero.

== Later Government career ==
After the restoration of the Mexican Republic, Romero served in the government of Porfirio Díaz and was a proponent of foreign investment in Mexico.

On 15 January 1868, Romero was named Minister of the Treasury by President Benito Juárez. In May of that year, he was returned to Washington to complete the treaties which he had initiated in his previous assignment. Treaties signed pertain to claims of Mexican citizens against the U.S. and vice versa, citizenship, and consular matters. By August 1, his work on those treaties was concluded, and he returned to Mexico, as Secretary of Hacienda.

On 15 May 1872, Romero resigned from the Ministry (deteriorating health). By September 1875, he entered government service again, as substitute senator for Chiapas. By the following autumn he was named Deputy to the Congress of the Union for the fifth district of Oaxaca.

In May 1877 he was charged again, with the office of the Minister of Treasury, but resigned in 1879 from government service for health reasons.

== Return to Diplomacy ==
By 1879 he again returned to Washington, to establish a company to oversee construction of a railway between Mexico City to Oaxaca. He was named manager of the company.

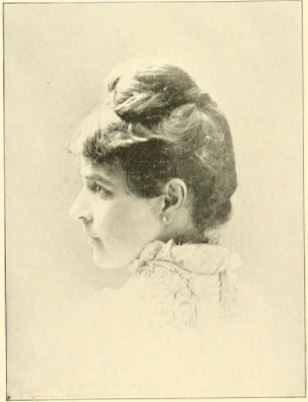
Mrs Matías Romero

On 15 May 1882, he was again called to service, to represent his country to USA. He was named ambassador extraordinaire and minister plenipotentiary, and in that capacity he signed a preliminary agreement on borders with Guatemala.

In Washington he was with his wife, Lucretia Allen, one of the most popular ladies in the diplomatic circle. She was born in Philadelphia and was educated partly in New York City.

From May to October 1883, Romero traveled across Europe as Mexican representative.

Romero died in New York City in 1898.

== Works ==
- Diario personal 1855-1865.
- Correspondencia de la Legación Mexicana en Washington durante la Intervención Extranjera. 1860-1868.
- El Estado de Oaxaca
- Mexico and the United States
