= Arturo Sarukhán =

Mexican diplomat (born 1963)

Arturo Sarukhan
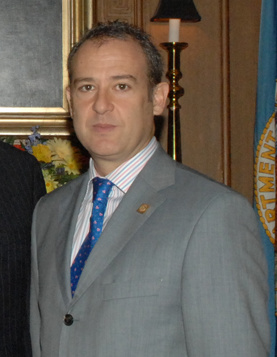

Ambassador of Mexico to the United States
- In office 27 February 2007 – 10 January 2013
- President: Felipe Calderón
- Preceded by: Carlos de Icaza González
- Succeeded by: Eduardo Medina-Mora Icaza

Personal details
- Born: 14 September 1963 (age 63) Mexico City, Mexico
- Spouse: Verónica Valencia-Sarukhan
- Relations: José Sarukhán Kermez (father)
- Education: El Colegio de México (BA); Johns Hopkins University (MA)

Arturo Sarukhán Casamitjana (Spanish: [saɾuˈxan]; born 14 September 1963) is a former ambassador of Mexico to the United States. A consultant and public speaker, he is also a nonresident senior fellow at The Brookings Institution, an adjunct professor at the Elliott School of International Affairs at George Washington University, a distinguished visiting professor at the Annenberg School of Public Diplomacy at the University of Southern California, and a Global Fellow at the Woodrow Wilson Center's Mexico Institute. He writes a biweekly column in Mexico City's El Universal newspaper and frequently publishes op-eds in U.S. media outlets. He also participates in a weekly Mexican television newscast on Milenio TV and a weekly radio segment on Enfoque Noticias.

Ambassador Sarukhán served as a career diplomat in the Mexican Foreign Service for 22 years, receiving the rank of career ambassador in 2006. From 2007 to 2013, he served as Mexico's ambassador to the United States.

In October 2009, Sarukhán became the first ambassador in Washington, D.C. to use Twitter in an official capacity as a public diplomacy and outreach and engagement tool. He tweets under the handle @arturo_sarukhan.

Sarukhán is a member of the Inter-American Dialogue.

== Background ==
His grandfather, Artur Sarukhanian, was an Armenian aide to the 2nd Minister-Chairman of the Russian Provisional Government, Alexander Kerensky. After Kerensky was overthrown by the Bolsheviks, Sarukhanian moved to Venice, Italy where he trained at the Mechitarist seminary. Sarukhán's grandmother fled to Thessaloniki, Greece during the Armenian genocide, then moved to Venice, where she met and later married Sarukhanian. Shortly after Benito Mussolini came to power, they left Italy for Mexico.

On his mother's side, Sarukhán is a descendant of Spanish Republican refugees. The Casamitjanas, a Catalan family, crossed the Pyrenees into France at the end of the Civil War and after the fall of Barcelona, and were held in a French concentration camp. They sought asylum in Mexico, when then President Lázaro Cárdenas welcomed thousands of Spanish Republicans who fled after the victory of Francisco Franco's fascist forces.

== Education and career ==
Sarukhán graduated from El Colegio de México with a bachelor's degree in International Relations and received a master's degree in U.S. Foreign Policy at the School of Advanced International Studies (SAIS) of Johns Hopkins University in Washington, D.C., where he studied as a Fulbright scholar and Ford Foundation Fellow. In 1988–1989, before joining Mexico's Foreign Service, Sarukhán served as the Executive Secretary of the Commission for the Future of Mexico-US relations, a non-governmental initiative funded by the Ford Foundation to recast the Mexico-US relationship.

He has served in different posts at the Secretariat of Foreign Affairs. In 1991, he was Deputy Assistant Secretary for Inter-American Affairs and during that period he also represented Mexico at the Agency for the Prohibition of Nuclear Weapons in Latin America and the Caribbean (OPANAL). In 1993, he was posted to the Embassy of Mexico in Washington DC and was the Chief of Staff to the Ambassador, during the NAFTA negotiations. In 1995 he was put in charge of the office for anti-narcotics in the same diplomatic mission. In 2000–2003, Sarukhán was designated Chief of Policy Planning to the Secretary of Foreign Affairs, and served as Consul General in New York City in 2003–2006.

As an academic, he has taught several courses at the Instituto Tecnológico Autónomo de México (ITAM), at the National Defense College, at the Inter-American Defense College, the National Defense University, and The George Washington University in the United States.

On 3 February 2006, he requested a leave of absence from the Foreign Service and left his post at the Consulate General in New York City to join Felipe Calderón's presidential campaign as international spokesperson and coordinator of foreign affairs.

He was appointed Ambassador to the United States on 27 January 2007, and served until January 2013.

Sarukhan is president of a business consulting firm which he founded in 2014, Sarukhan + Associates LLC. Based in the Washington D.C. area, Sarukhan + Associates LLC provides counsel to clients concerning government relations, public affairs strategies, issue management, political risk analysis, regulatory compliance, and strategic communications and advocacy.
