= Jesús Federico Reyes Heroles =

Mexican politician (1952–2024)

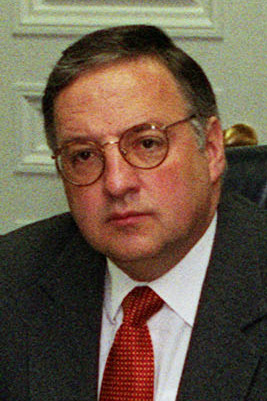
- Reyes Heroles in 2000

Director-general of Banobras
- In office 1994–1995
- President: Ernesto Zedillo

Energy Secretary
- In office 1995–1997
- President: Ernesto Zedillo

Ambassador to the United States
- In office 1997–2000
- President: Ernesto Zedillo

Director-general of PEMEX
- In office 2006–2009
- President: Felipe Calderón Hinojosa

Personal details
- Born: 7 February 1952 Mexico City, Mexico
- Died: 21 January 2024 (aged 71)
- Parent: Jesús Reyes Heroles (father)

Jesús Federico Reyes Heroles González Garza (7 February 1952 – 21 January 2024) was a Mexican economist and politician. He was a member of the Institutional Revolutionary Party (PRI) and co-founder and executive president of Grupo de Economistas y Asociados (GEA), a consulting firm that has become the first independent organization dedicated to political and economic analysis. He held a B.A. in Economics from the Instituto Tecnológico Autónomo de México (ITAM) and a Ph.D. in Economics from the Massachusetts Institute of Technology (MIT).

== Life and career ==
Reyes Heroles studied economics in Mexico and abroad.

In December 1994, President Ernesto Zedillo appointed him director-general of the Banco Nacional de Obras y Servicios Públicos (BANOBRAS), the development bank for infrastructure. In 1995, Zedillo chose him as Secretary of Energy; he left that position in October 1997 when he was appointed Ambassador to the United States, where he served until November 2000.

In the run-up to the 2006 general election he publicly expressed his opposition to the nomination of the PRI's Roberto Madrazo and support for the National Action Party presidential candidate, Felipe Calderón Hinojosa, although he did not renounce his party membership.

Following his victory in the election, President Calderón named Reyes Heroles as director-general of Petróleos Mexicanos (PEMEX) in December 2006. On 8 September 2009, he was relieved of that position.

Reyes Heroles died on 21 January 2024, at the age of 71.
