= José Manuel Puig Casauranc =

Mexican politician

Head of the Federal District Department
- In office 1 January 1929 – 31 May 1930
- President: Emilio Portes Gil
- Preceded by: Primo Villa Michel
- Succeeded by: Crisóforo Ibáñez

Secretary of Foreign Affairs
- In office 1 January 1933 – 30 November 1934
- President: Abelardo L. Rodríguez
- Preceded by: Manuel C. Téllez
- Succeeded by: Emilio Portes Gil

3rd Secretary of Public Education
- In office 9 December 1930 – 9 October 1931
- President: Pascual Ortiz Rubio
- Preceded by: Carlos Trejo Lerdo de Tejada
- Succeeded by: Narciso Bassols
- In office 1 December 1924 – 22 August 1928
- President: Plutarco Elías Calles
- Preceded by: Bernardo J. Gastélum
- Succeeded by: Moisés Sáenz

Member of the Chamber of Deputies for Veracruz's 19th district
- In office 1 September 1922 – 31 August 1924
- Preceded by: Aurelio P. Márquez
- Succeeded by: Andrés E. Gómez

Personal details
- Born: José Manuel Puig Casauranc; 31 January 1888 Laguna del Carmen, Campeche
- Died: 5 May 1939 (aged 51) Havana, Cuba

José Manuel Puig Casauranc (31 January 1888 – 5 May 1939) was a Mexican politician, diplomat and journalist who served as Secretary of Public Education, Secretary of Industry, Commerce and Labor, Secretary of Foreign Affairs and federal legislator in both the Senate and Chamber of Deputies. As a key adviser to President Plutarco Elías Calles (1924–28), he is credited with drafting Calles's speech to Congress following the assassination of President-elect Álvaro Obregón declaring the end of the age of caudillos and the start of rule of institutions and laws.

== Life and career ==
He did his basic studies in the state of Veracruz and in 1911 he graduated as a medical doctor from the School of Medicine in Mexico City. He was also elected that year as a deputy to the congress, where he was a supporter of Francisco I. Madero. Following the coup of Victoriano Huerta ousting Madero in February 1913, Puig Casauranc refused to recognize Huerta's government, for which he was arrested. He remained exiled in the United States during part of the Mexican Revolution, until he returned to occupy a deputation in 1922. By then he is clearly identified with the political group of Sonoran generals turned politicians, Álvaro Obregón and Plutarco Elías Calles.

He directed Calles's presidential campaign for the 1924 elections. Puig Casauranc was elected Senator for Campeche, but Calles appointed him as the head of the Ministry of Public Education. During the interim presidency of Emilio Portes Gil (1928-1930), he served as Head of the Department of the Federal District (1929–30), the jurisdiction of the national capital. Following the election of Pascual Ortiz Rubio as president, he appointed Puig Casauranc as Secretary of Education (1930–31) for a second term, and then Mexican Ambassador to the United States (1931–33). After Ortiz Rubio's resignation, President Abelardo L. Rodríguez appointed him Secretary of Foreign Affairs (1933–34).He was outspoken in this position. The "apogee of his public career was his confrontation with U.S. Secretary of State, Cordell Hull, at the 1933 Pan-American Conference in Montevideo, Uruguay... critici[zing] international bankers and U.S. dominance in the Mexican economy."

In 1934 he refused to direct the presidential campaign of Lázaro Cárdenas. He also turned down offers that Cárdenas himself made him to head a number of ministries. Instead he was appointed Ambassador to Argentina (1935–36).

On his return to the country he retired from politics and devoted himself to practicing medicine and to contributing to newspapers such as El Imparcial and El Universal. He was a corresponding member of the Mexican Academy of the Language.

== Works ==
- De la vida (Cuentos crueles) (1922)
- Páginas viejas con ideas actuales (1925)
- De otros días (1926)
- De nuestro México, cosas actuales y aspectos políticos (1926)
- La hermana impura (1927)
- Juárez, una interpretación humana (1928)
- La cosecha y la siembra (1928)
- La cuestión religiosa en relación con la educación primaria en México (1928)
- Su venganza (1930)
- Mirando la vida (1933)
- Una política social económica de preparación socialista (1933)
- El sentido social del proceso histórico de México (1935)
- Los errores de Satanás (1937)
- Galatea rebelde a varios Pigmaliones (1938)
