= Bernardo J. Gastélum =

Mexican physician, politician, and writer

Bernardo José Gastélum Izabal (August 4, 1886, in Culiacán – December 21, 1981, in Mexico City) was a Mexican physician, politician, and writer.

== Biography ==
Gastélum got his secondary education and his baccalaureate at the Colegio Rosales, and did his studies of medicine at the Universidad de Guadalajara, and his postgraduate studies at the Columbia University College of Physicians and Surgeons.

After 1909 he taught at the Colegio Rosales, where he was director from 1915 to 1916, and for a second time from 1918 to 1922. During his second period he turned it in the University of Occident, today Universidad Autónoma de Sinaloa. After the Mexican Revolution, he served as ambassador in Uruguay, Paraguay, Italy and Hungary.

When he returned to Mexico in 1923, he became Subsecretary of Education, and was Secretary of Public Education from July 2 to November 30. It was he, who asked Ezequiel A. Chávez, president of the Universidad Nacional de México, to come up with a project that would ensure the university's autonomy, but without success.

From 1925 to 1928, President Plutarco Elias Calles named him as Chief of the Health Department in Mexico, transforming it into what we know now as "Secretaría de Salubridad".

Gastélum was co-founder of the Contemporáneos magazine. In 1932 he was chief of the department of health of Sinaloa, and from 1938 to 1947 director of the Escuela Preparatoria (preparatory school). In 1949 he moved back to Mexico City, where he worked for several journals and magazines. In 1965 he became honorary doctor of the Universidad de Sinaloa.

The General Hospital of his hometown is named in honor of him.

Government offices
Preceded by José Vasconcelos	Secretary of Public Education of Mexico; 1924	Succeeded by José Manuel Puig Casauranc
