= Roberto V. Pesqueira =

Mexican politician (1882–1966)

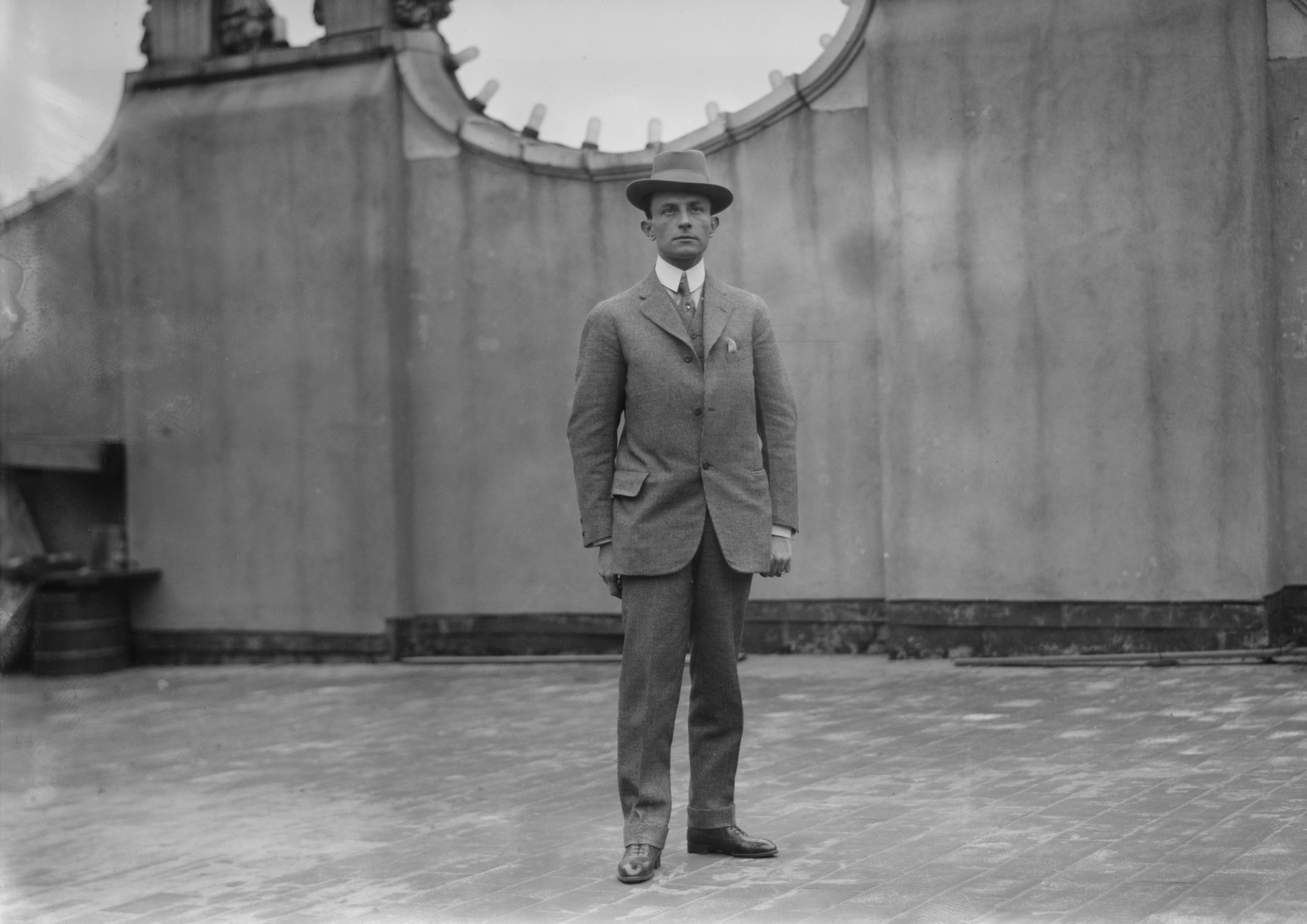

Federal Deputy of Mexico
- In office 1913–1913
- Constituency: District 1, Sonora
- In office 1917–?

Personal details
- Born: 1882 Arizpe, Sonora
- Died: 1966 (aged 83–84)
- Party: Anti-Reelectionist Party (1911)
- Relations: Ignacio L. Pesqueira (brother)

Roberto V. Pesqueira Morales (1882 – 1966) was a Mexican politician who was elected twice to the Chamber of Deputies and was commissioned by President Venustiano Carranza to work as a confidential agent in the United States and secure diplomatic recognition to his regime.

Pesqueira was born in Arizpe, Sonora. His older brother, Ignacio, went on to serve as Governor of Sonora. Roberto joined Francisco I. Madero's Anti-Reelectionist Party in 1910 and was elected federal deputy representing the first district of Sonora in 1913, but refused to serve in the Chamber of Deputies after the consummation of Victoriano Huerta's coup d'état on 20 February 1913, and decided to join the revolutionary forces instead.

He was elected federal deputy once again in 1917 and acquired oil fields some years later. In February 1923 he wrote a letter to President Álvaro Obregón, alerting him of some irregularities detected in his foreign competitors; in particular, the Huasteca Oil Company.

== See also ==
- Constitutionalists in the Mexican Revolution
- United States–Mexico relations
