= Carlos Trejo Lerdo de Tejada =

Mexican politician and diplomat

Carlos Trejo Lerdo de Tejada (1879 – 1941) was a Mexican politician and diplomat. Carlos Trejo y Lerdo de Tejada was a Mexican politician, lawyer, and diplomat who served as the governor of the Northern Territory of Baja California.

Carlos Trejo Lerdo de Tejada occupied various important posts in public administration during the 1920s and 1930s. He was always linked to the Sonoran group in power from 1920 to 1934 led by Plutarco Elías Calles. He served as a federal deputy, ambassador to Argentina, Chile, and Cuba, secretary of public education under the administration of Pascual Ortiz Rubio, and governor of the Northern District of Baja California. Under Trejo Lerdo de Tejada's administration, the District was split into two distinct federal territories that replaced the districts. He then became the governor of the Northern Territory of Baja California. He was tall.
