= Secretary of Foreign Affairs (Mexico) =

Mexican cabinet member responsible for foreign policy

Secretary of Foreign Affairs of the United Mexican States
- Secretario de Relaciones Exteriores
- Seal of the Government of Mexico
- Incumbent; Roberto Velasco Álvarez since 1 April 2026
- Secretariat of Foreign Affairs
- Member of: Cabinet of Mexico
- Reports to: President of Mexico
- Seat: Mexico City
- Appointer: President of Mexico
- Formation: 8 November 1821
- First holder: José Manuel de Herrera

The secretary of foreign affairs (Spanish: Secretario de Relaciones Exteriores) is the foreign secretary of Mexico, responsible for implementing the country's foreign policy. The secretary is appointed by the president of Mexico to head the Secretariat of Foreign Affairs (Spanish: Secretaría de Relaciones Exteriores) and is a member of the federal executive cabinet. The secretary is commonly referred to in Spanish as Canciller ("Chancellor").

The incumbent secretary, since 1 April 2026, is Roberto Velasco Álvarez.

== List of secretaries ==
- Ignacio Mariscal 1880–1883, 1885–1910
- Enrique Creel 1910–1911
- Francisco León de la Barra 1911, 1913
- Victoriano Salado Álvarez 1911
- Bartolomé Carbajal y Rosas 1911
- Manuel Calero y Sierra 1911–1912
- Pedro Lascuráin 1912–1913
- Federico Gamboa 1913
- Francisco Escudero 1913
- Querido Moheno 1913–1914
- José López Portillo y Rojas 1914
- Francisco S. Carvajal 1914
- Ignacio Borrego 1915
- Cándido Aguilar 1916, 1916–1917, 1918
- Miguel Covarrubias Acosta 1920
- Cutberto Hidalgo Téllez 1920–1921
- Alberto J. Pani Arteaga 1921-1924
- Aarón Sáenz Garza 1924–1927
- Genaro Estrada 1930–1932
- Manuel C. Téllez 1932 (interim)
- José Manuel Puig Casauranc 1933–1934
- Emilio Portes Gil 1934–1935
- Eduardo Hay 1935–1940
- Ezequiel Padilla Peñaloza 1940–1945
- Francisco Castillo Nájera 1945–1946
- Jaime Torres Bodet 1946–1951
- Manuel Tello Baurraud 1951–1952
- Luis Padilla Nervo 1952–1958
- Manuel Tello Baurraud 1958–1964
- José Gorostiza 1964 (interim)
- Antonio Carrillo Flores 1964–1970
- Emilio Óscar Rabasa 1970–1975
- Alfonso García Robles 1975–1976
- Santiago Roel García 1976–1979
- Jorge Castañeda y Álvarez de la Rosa 1979–1982
- Bernardo Sepúlveda Amor 1982–1988
- Fernando Solana 1988–1993
- Manuel Camacho Solís 1993–1994
- Manuel Tello Macías 1994 (interim)
- José Ángel Gurría 1994–1998
- Rosario Green 1998–2000
- Jorge Castañeda Gutman 2000–2003
- Luis Ernesto Derbez 2003–2006
- Patricia Espinosa 2006–2012
- José Antonio Meade 2012–2015
- Claudia Ruiz Massieu 2015–2017
- Luis Videgaray Caso 2017–2018
- Marcelo Ebrard 2018–2023
- Alicia Bárcena 2023–2024
- Juan Ramón de la Fuente 2024–2026
- Roberto Velasco Álvarez 2026-present

== List of doctrines ==
- Estrada Doctrine
- Castañeda Doctrine
