= Alejandro Estivill =

Mexican diplomat and novelist

Alejandro Ives Estivill Castro is a Mexican diplomat and novelist. He specializes in Mexican literature of the 20th Century. He holds a BA in Hispanic Literature from the National Autonomous University of Mexico (UNAM) and a PhD. in Literature from El Colegio de México.

He participated in the workshop that would originate the Crack Movement in 1999, and with authors Jorge Volpi, Ignacio Padilla and others published Variations of a Faulkner Theme, a book that won the National Story Prize that same year. He has taught at Harvard and Mexico’s Technological Institute (ITESM) and written numerous articles, related both to culture and international relations.

After his entrance into the Foreign Service in 1993, he has served as special advisor to the Secretary of Foreign Relations, Political Affairs Attaché for the Mexican Embassy in Costa Rica, Chief of Staff for the Undersecretary of Foreign Relations Enrique Berruga, Director General for Cultural Affairs and Director General for North American Affairs. He held the position of Chargé d´Affairs at the Embassy of Mexico in the United Kingdom of Great Britain and Northern Ireland, Deputy Chief of Mission at Embassy of Mexico in the United States and General Consul of Mexico in Montreal, Canada. He was appointed Ambassador of Mexico to Ethiopia in 2024.

On June 1, 2012, President Felipe Calderón granted him the rank of Ambassador of Mexico (a rank he will hold for life, as a career member of Mexico's Foreign Service).

== Books ==
- Un tirso ludico (Universidad Nacional Autónoma de México, Facultad de Filosofía y Letras, 1989)
- Variaciones sobre un tema de Faulkner (with Jorge Volpi, Ignacio Padilla y Eloy Urroz)
- En la mirada del avestruz y otros cuentos.
- El hombre bajo la piel. (México, D.F. Plaza y Janés, 2002)
- Alfil. Los tres pecados del elefante. (Madrid, Spain, Colección Akkrón de Novela Negra, 2017)
- El Lugar de los Descarnados (Bogotá, Nueve editores, 2021.
- Los fragmentarios (Mexico, Trajín, 2023).
