= Francisco Castillo Nájera =

Mexican diplomat and politician

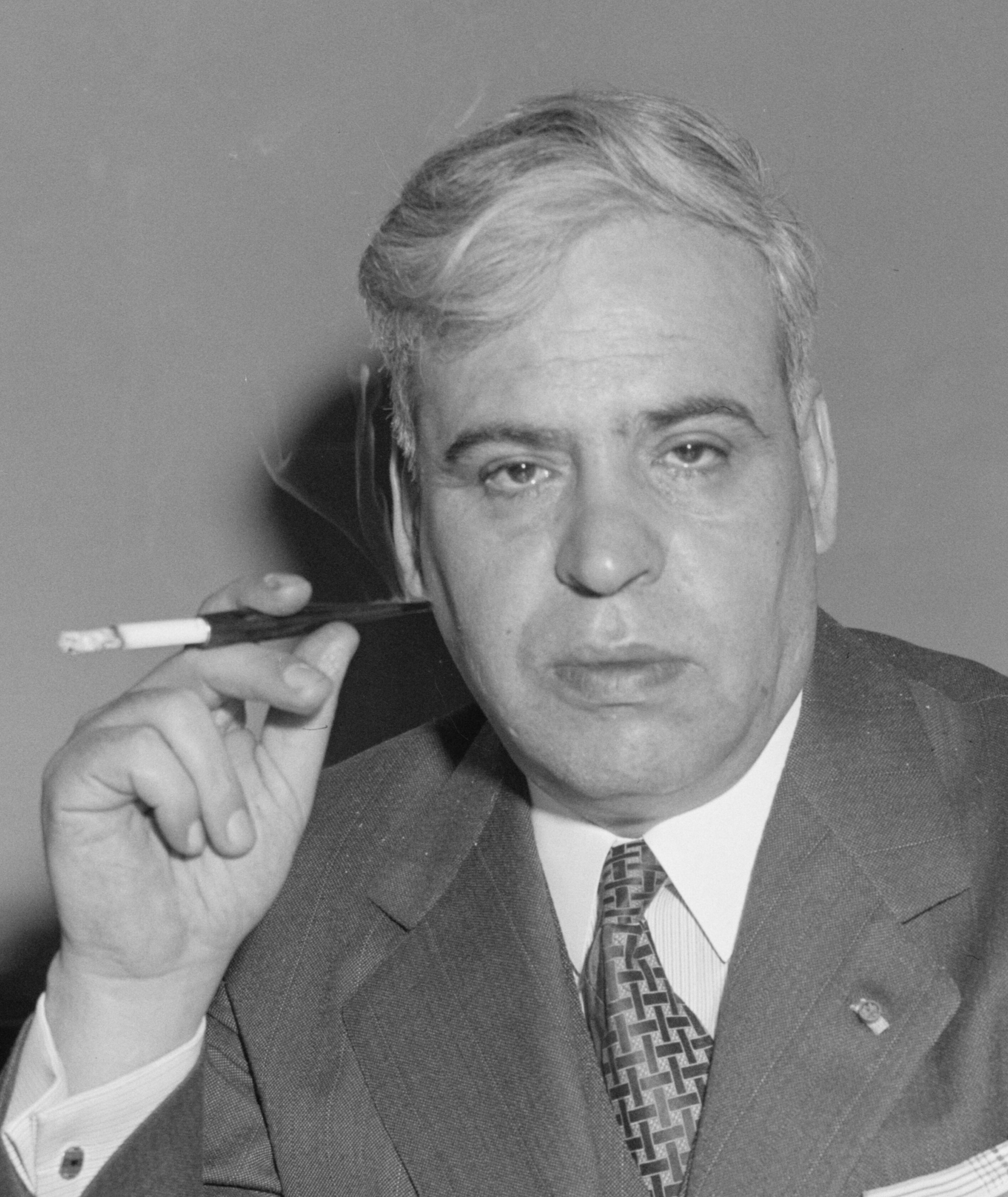
Castillo in 1939

Francisco Castillo Nájera (25 November 1886 – 20 December 1954) was a Mexican diplomat and politician. He was president of the Assembly of the League of Nations from 1934 to 1935, ambassador to China (1922) and the United States (where he served as the dean of the diplomatic corps in 1945, the last year of his tenure) and Secretary of Foreign Affairs from 1945 to 1946.
