= Rafael Zubarán Capmany =

Mexican politician

Zubarán circa 1914

Rafael Epifanio Zubarán Capmany (7 April 1875 – 1 February 1948) was a Mexican lawyer from Campeche. He was Mexican Secretary of Economy from 1920 to 1922.

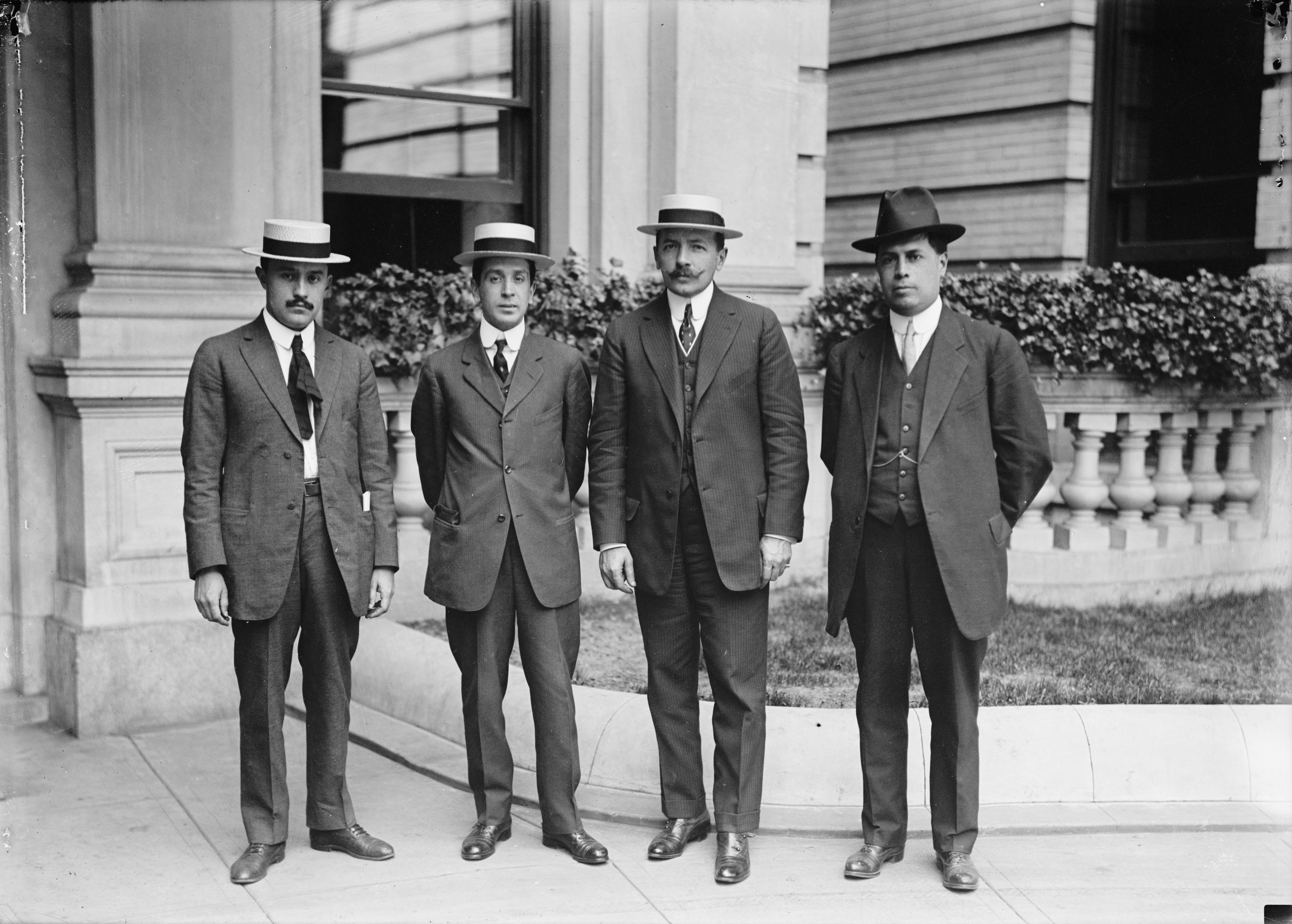
José Vasconcelos, José Urquidi, Rafael Zubarán and Peredo

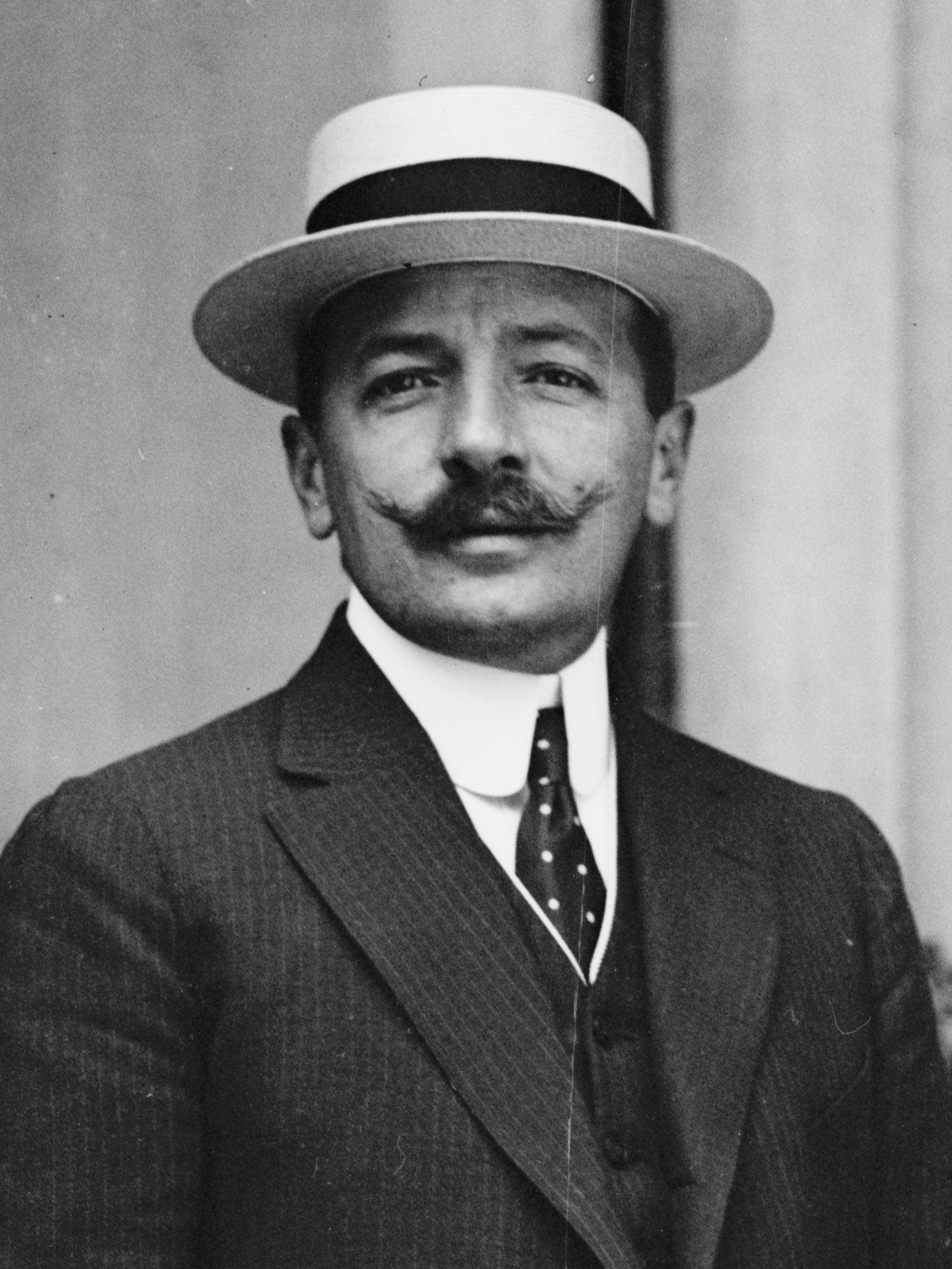
Rafael Zubarán Capmany in 1914

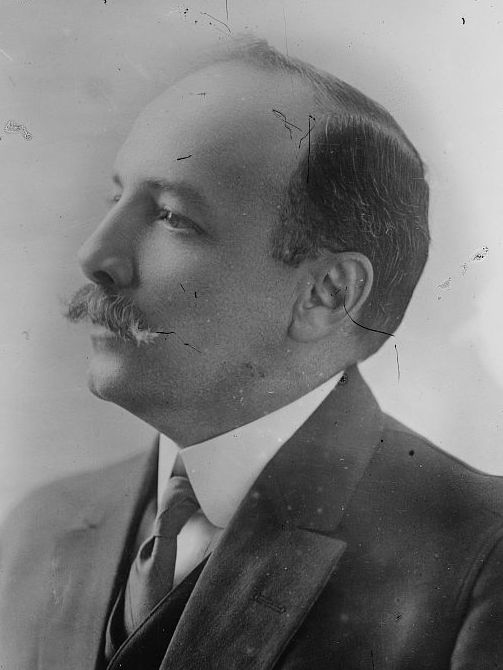
