= Julio Torri =

Mexican writer and teacher

Julio Torri Maynes (June 27, 1889 in Saltillo, Coahuila – May 11, 1970 in Mexico City) was a Mexican writer and teacher who formed part of the Ateneo de la Juventud (1909–1914). He wrote mainly in the essay form, although his limited production included short stories and scholarly works as well. Considered one of the best prose stylists of Latin America, he was admitted to the Academia Mexicana de la Lengua in 1952. His parents were Julio S. Torri and Sofía Maynes de Torri.

== Biography ==
=== Education ===
He began his schooling in Colegio Torreón and later in the Escuela Juan Antonio de la Fuente, both in Saltillo. In 1908 he travelled to Mexico City and in 1913 obtained a law degree from the National Law School; in 1933 he was awarded a doctorate in letters from the Universidad Nacional Autónoma de México (UNAM).

=== Career ===
He formed part of the Ateneo de la Juventud, a literary generation that also included Rafael Cabrera, Jesus T. Acevedo, Alfonso Cravioto, Antonio Caso, Ricardo Gómez Robledo, Enrique González Martínez, Pedro Henríquez Ureña, Salvador Novo, Alfonso Reyes, Diego Rivera, José Vasconcelos, and Luis G. Urbina. He engaged from 1914 to 1922 in voluminous correspondence with Alfonso Reyes, who during that time was residing in Europe. From 1916 to 1923 he co-edited with Agustín Loera the editorial Cultura. He was founder and director of the SEP's Departamento de Bibliotecas (Department of Libraries) and served as its literary classics editor. In 1921 he founded, along with Xavier Guerrero, José Clemente Orozco, and Vicente Lombardo Toledano, the syndicalist Grupo Solidario del Movimiento Obrero. He taught literature for nearly half a century at several institutions, including the National Preparatory School, the UNAM, and for various summers at the University of Texas, holding from 1953 onward the title of UNAM Emeritus Professor. He undertook poetic and pedagogical ambassadorships to countries like Argentina, Brazil, and the United States, while a trip to Europe in 1952 inspired some of his writing. In 2001 CONACULTA and the Coahuilan Institute of Culture (Icocult) established the Premio Nacional de Cuento Joven Julio Torri, a prize for young writers that honors Julio Torri.

=== Family ===
His nephew, Julio Torri Cervi (1932–2003), was a famous eccentric who lived for a time in Tulancingo.

== Literary oeuvre ==
Torri's oeuvre was distinctly influenced by his readings of Charles Lamb, Marcel Schwob, Jules Renard, Jules Laforgue, Stéphane Mallarmé, and above all Oscar Wilde. He produced notable essays on Aeschylus, Maeterlinck, Proust, Tolstoy, Aldous Huxley, José Juan Tablada, Reyes, and Luis Gonzaga Urbina. He was a translator of works by Pascal and Heinrich Heine. As an author his preferred forms were the essay (which put on display his impressive learning and culture) and the short story. He is credited with being one of the earliest practitioners of prose poetry and writers of estampas (literary sketches) in Mexico; he is also noted for his mastery of the epigraph. He was a fastidious writer who endlessly polished and refined his words, clarity and purity were the hallmarks of his style.

Torri is widely recognized as the initiator of minificción (flash fiction) in Mexico. His story "Circe," from Ensayos y poemas (1917), is considered the founding text of the genre in the country and regularly opens anthologies of Latin American microfiction. His stylistic innovations in brevity and irony influenced subsequent generations of writers, among them Juan José Arreola and Augusto Monterroso. The same perfectionism that characterized his style is also credited with limiting his total output; his biographers describe him as a shy man of exceptional wit who endlessly revised and rarely declared a text finished.

His most important works are Ensayos y poemas (Essays and Poems) (1917), De fusilamientos (On Executions [Fusillations]) (1940), Tres libros (Three Books) (1964), Diálogo de los libros (Dialogue of the Books) (1980, posthumous).

== Published works ==
(list not comprehensive)

- Ensayos y poemas (1917)
- Ensayos y fantasias (1918)
- Romances viejos (1918)
- Las noches florentinas (Heinrich Heine; Julio Torri [translator])
- De fusilamientos (1940)
- Discurso sobre las pasiones del amor (Blaise Pascal; Julio Torri [translator])
- Sentencias y lugares comunes (1945)
- La literaura española (1952)
- La Revista moderna de Mexico; discurso de ingreso en la Academia Mexicana de la Lengua, correspondiente de la Española (1954)
- Tres libros: Ensayos y poemas, De fusilamientos, Prosas dispersas (1964)
- Diálogo de los libros (edited by Serge I. Zaïtzeff) (1980)
- El ladrón de ataúdes (edition Serge Zaïtzeff) (1987)
- Epistolarios (edition Serge Zaïtzeff) (1995)

== Bibliography ==
- (English) Cortés, Eladio, Dictionary of Mexican Literature. Westport, CT: Greenwood Press, 1992.
- (Spanish) Alboukrek, Arrón, Diccionario de Escritores Hispanoamericanos, Mexico: Ediciones Larousse, 1991.
- (Spanish) Ocampo de Gómez, Aurora Maura, Diccionario de escritores mexicanos, siglo XX : desde las generaciones del Ateneo y novelistas de la Revolución hasta nuestros días. Mexico: Universidad Nacional Autónoma de México, Instituto de Investigaciones Filológicas, Centro de Estudios Literarios, 1992.
