= Alfonso Reyes =

Mexican writer, philosopher and diplomat (1889–1959)

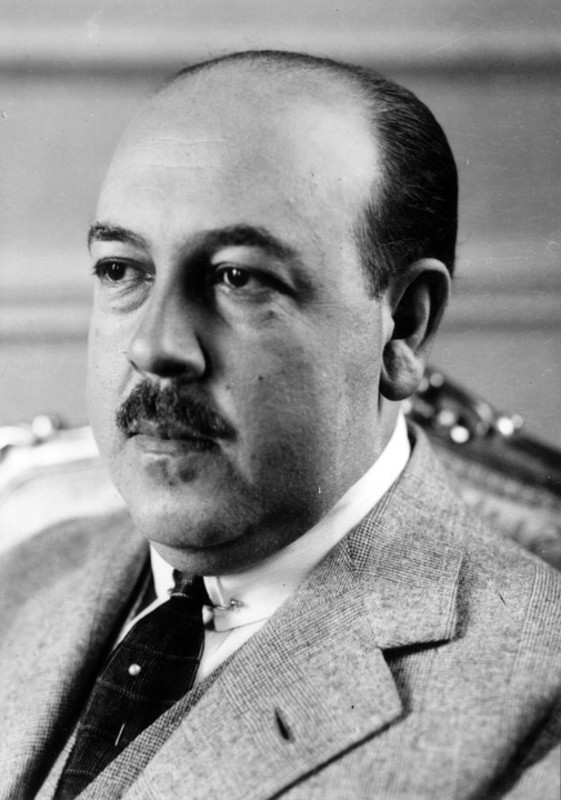
- Reyes in 1924
- Born: Alfonso Reyes Ochoa; 17 May 1889; Monterrey, Nuevo León, Mexico
- Died: 27 December 1959 (aged 70)
- Education: National Autonomous University of Mexico
- Occupations: Writer, philosopher and diplomat
- Employer(s): La Casa de España, El Colegio de México, Academia Mexicana de la Lengua, El Colegio Nacional
- Known for: Ambassador
- Spouse: Manuela Mota Gómez
- Children: Alfonso Bernardo Reyes Mota
- Father: Bernardo Reyes
- Awards: Premio Nacional de Ciencias y Artes (Literature & Linguistics); Honorary Doctorate (Princeton University, La Sorbona, University of California Berkeley)

Alfonso Reyes Ochoa (Note: In this Mexican name, the surname is Reyes and the second or maternal family name is Ochoa.) (17 May 1889 – 27 December 1959) was a Mexican writer, philosopher and diplomat. He was nominated for the Nobel Prize in Literature five times and has been acclaimed as one of the greatest authors in the Spanish language. He served as ambassador of Mexico to Argentina and Brazil.

== Biography ==
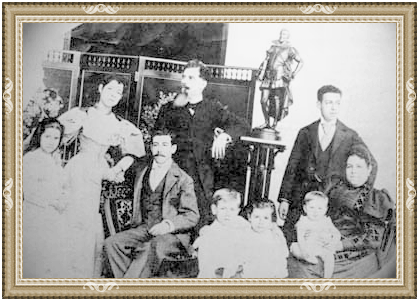
Reyes Ochoa family

Born in Monterrey, Nuevo León, Alfonso Reyes was the ninth of the twelve children of General Bernardo Reyes Ogazón, Governor of Nuevo León and Secretary of War and Navy under President Porfirio Díaz (considered by some to be his natural successor), and his wife Aurelia Ochoa-Garibay y Sapién, a member of a prominent family from Jalisco, direct descendants of Conquistador Diego de Ochoa-Garibay, as documented by Reyes in his Parentalia.

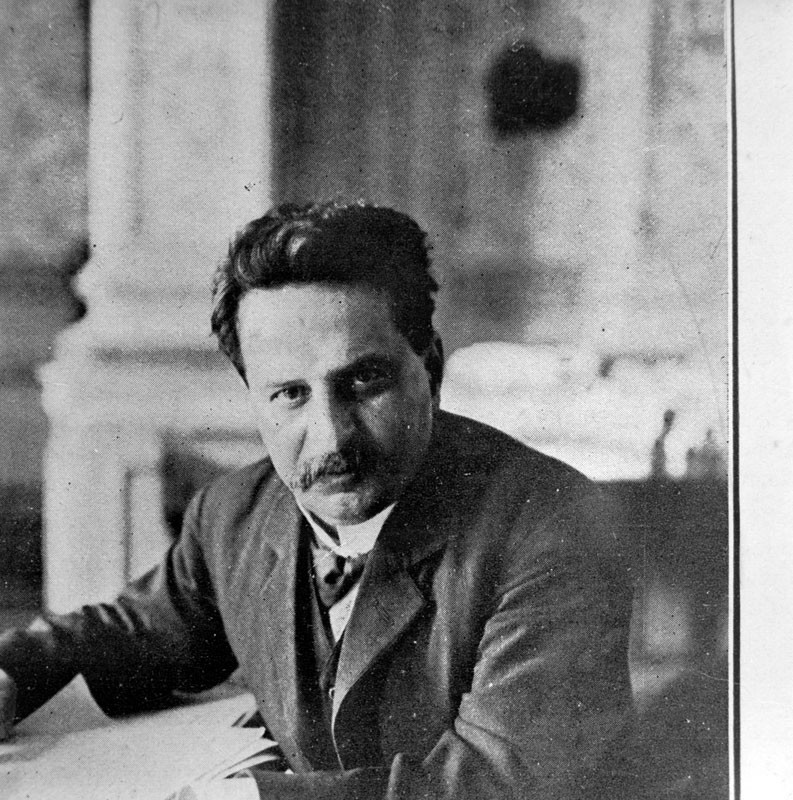
Reyes in 1910

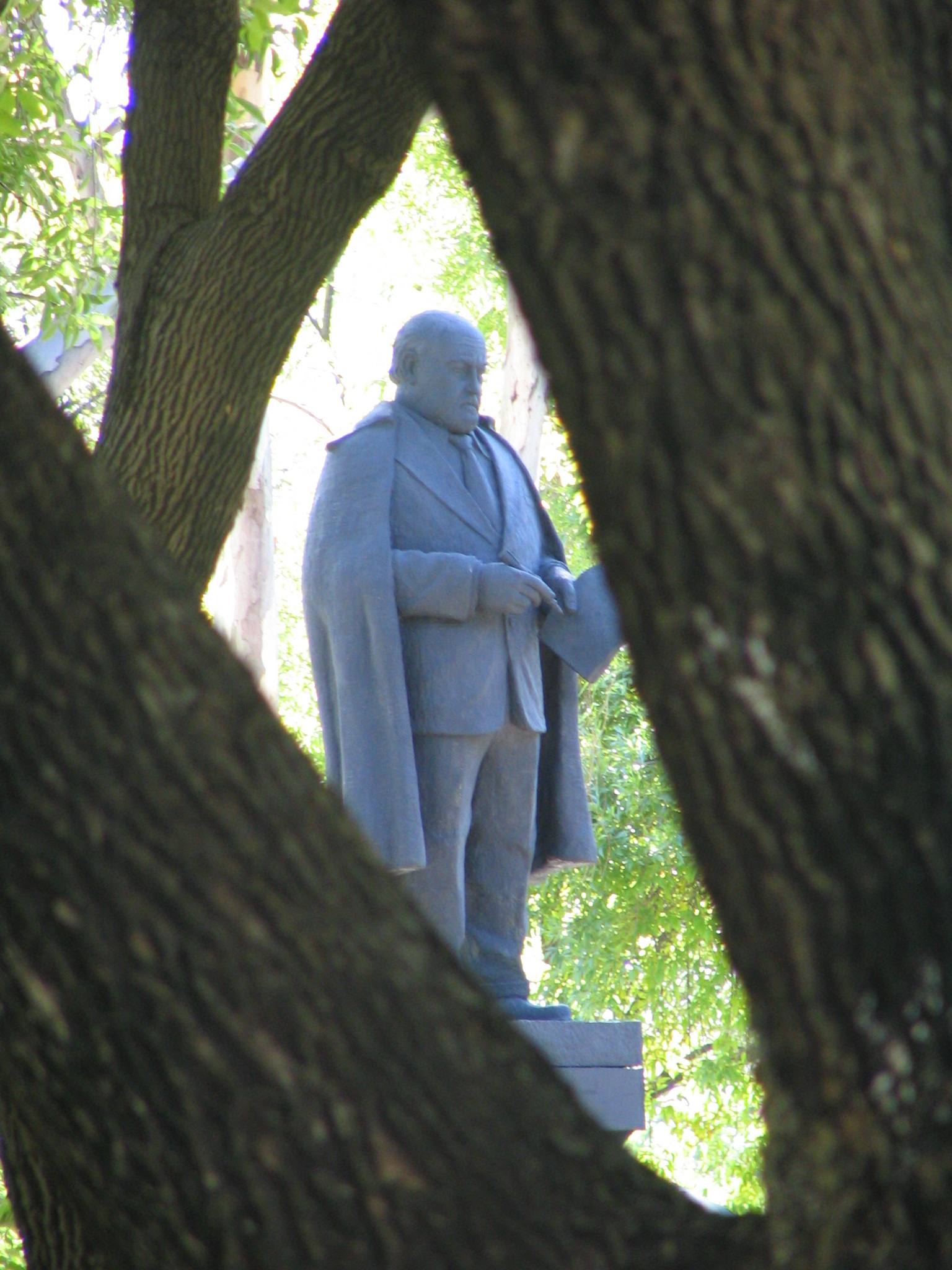
Statue of Alfonso Reyes in Monterrey

Reyes was educated at various colleges in Monterrey, the Liceo Francés de México, the Colegio Civil de Monterrey, and later at the Escuela Nacional Preparatoria and graduated from the Escuela Nacional de Jurisprudencia, which later became the law school at the National Autonomous University of Mexico (UNAM) in 1913.

In 1909, he helped to found the Ateneo de la Juventud, along with other young intellectuals including Martín Luis Guzmán, José Vasconcelos, Julio Torri, and Pedro Henríquez Ureña, to promote new cultural and aesthetic ideals and educational reform in Mexico. In 1911, Reyes published his first book, Cuestiones estéticas. The following year, he wrote the short story La Cena ("The Supper"), which is considered a forerunner of surrealism and Latin American magical realism. In that year he was also named Secretary of the Escuela Nacional de Altos Estudios at the National University.

Reyes obtained his law degree in 1913, the same year that his father died while participating in an coup d'état against President Francisco I. Madero.

Alfonso Reyes was posted to Mexico's diplomatic service in France in 1913. After Germany invaded France in 1914, he moved to Madrid, Spain, and pursued a literary career as journalist, investigator, translator, critic, and writer. In 1915, he wrote what is probably his best-known essay, Visión de Anáhuac (1519) with its famous epigraph, "Viajero: has llegado a la región más transparente del aire", the source of the title of Carlos Fuentes's novel La región más transparente (1958). Visión de Anáhuac is inspired by the "vitalist" philosophy of Henri Bergson and can be seen as a study on the metamorphosis in the process of creative evolution.

Reyes was reinstated in the diplomatic service in 1920. He was the second secretary in Spain in 1920, was in Paris from 1924 to 1927, and then served as the ambassador to Argentina (1927–1930 and 1936–1937). He was the Mexican ambassador to Brazil from 1930 to 1935 and again in 1938. In 1939, he retired from the diplomatic corps and returned to Mexico, where he organized what is today El Colegio de México and dedicated himself to writing and teaching. He was elected to the American Philosophical Society in 1950.

== Years in Spain ==
His time in Spain, from 1914 to 1924, is regarded as his most productive creative period, during which he developed as a writer and refined his literary skills.

Despite facing financial difficulties, he dedicated himself to literature and combined it with journalism. He worked at the Centro de Estudios Históricos (Historical Study Center) of Madrid under the direction of Ramón Menéndez Pidal. In 1919, he was named the Mexican Commission Secretary "Francisco del Paso y Troncoso", the same year that Cantar de mio Cid was put into prose.

Many of his friends insisted that he was a natural in Spanish and should pursue a career in politics, but he declined to do so. One time he was presented with an offer to teach, but he rejected it. He was more interested in the aesthetics of Benedetto Croce. He published numerous essays about poetry of the Spanish Golden Age, such as Baroque y Góngora; on top of that he was one of the first writers to study the poetry of Juana Inés de la Cruz. From 1917 he produced Cartones de Madrid, his small masterpiece, Visión de Anáhuac, El suicida, and in 1921, El cazador. He was a collaborator of Revista de Filología Española, Revista de Occidente and Revue Hispanique. His works about Spanish literature, older classical literature and aesthetics are notable, and among the more notable of that time, Cuestiones estéticas (1911). In Spain he organized a ceremony on 11 September 1923 at the Real Jardín Botánico de Madrid (Royal Botanical Garden of Madrid) to honor the memory of the symbolic poet Stéphane Mallarmé.

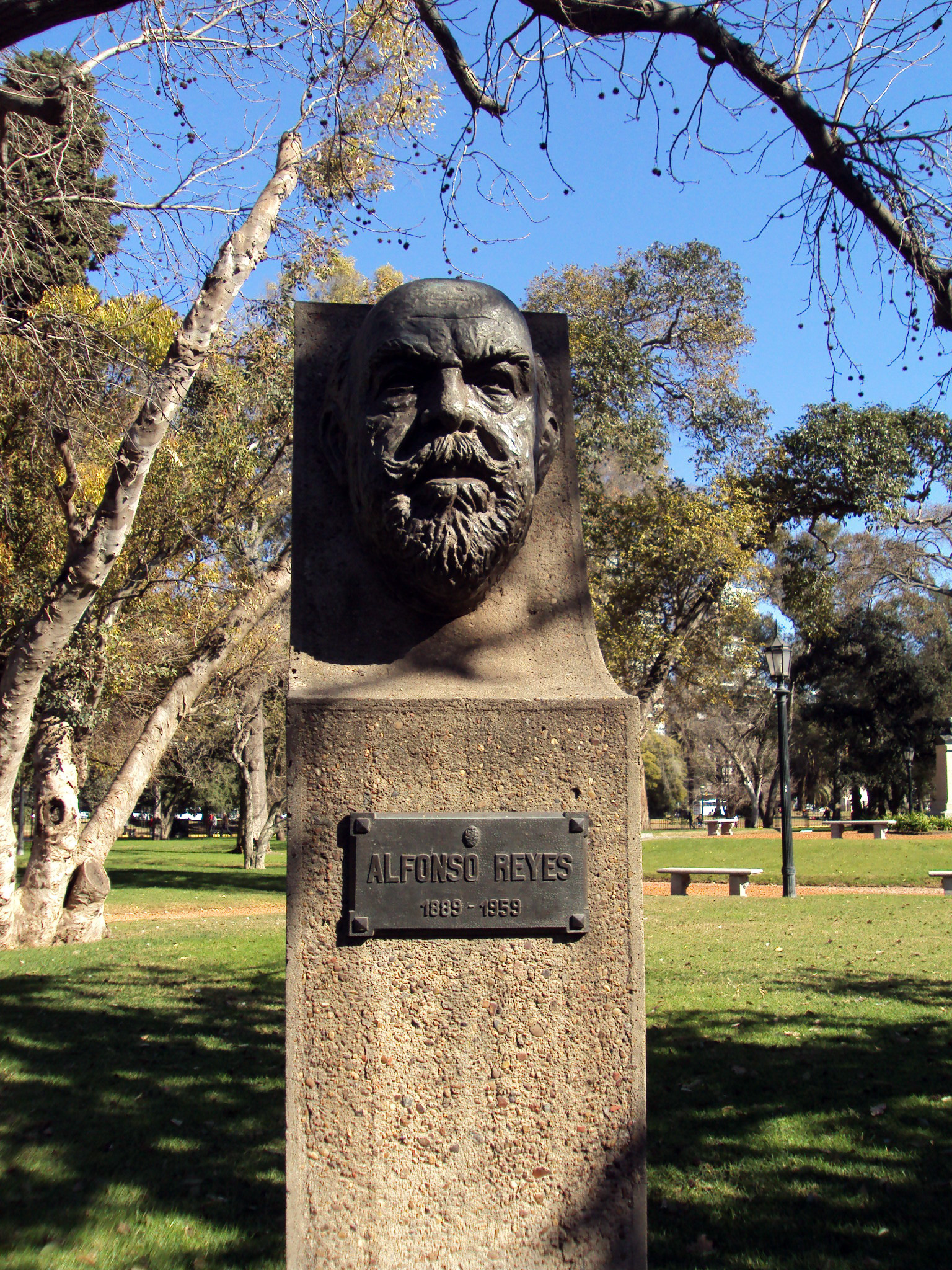
Monument to Alfonso Reyes in Buenos Aires

After 1924 he developed a diplomatic and social life in Paris, Buenos Aires and Rio de Janeiro (he served as an ambassador of Mexico to Argentina and Brazil). He translated Mallarmé and edited his own literary mail, Monterrey, publishing it in 1930. He wrote to friends abroad in every part of the world and gave talks, spoke at conferences and contributed to homages and cultural events.

He published among others, Cuestiones gongorinas (1927), Capítulos de literatura española (1939–195), Discurso por Virgilio (1931). His poetic works reveal a profound knowledge of the formal means, notably Ifigenia cruel (1924), Pausa (1926), 5 casi sonetos (1931), Otra voz (1936) and Cantata en la tumba de Federico García Lorca (1937).

Reyes translated works by Laurence Sterne, G. K. Chesterton, and Anton Chekhov and edited works by Juan Ruiz de Alarcón, Cantar del Mio Cid, Lope de Vega, Baltasar Gracián, Juan Ruiz, and Francisco de Quevedo.

He died in Mexico City on 27 December 1959.

== Legacy ==
The Argentinian writer Jorge Luis Borges referred to Reyes as "the greatest prose writer in the Spanish language of any age". At least five avenues in the Monterrey metropolitan area, three in the municipality and one in Mexico City are named after Reyes.

There are many monuments built in honor of Alfonso Reyes in different Spanish speaking countries around the world.

On 17 May 2018, Google Doodle commemorated Alfonso Reyes's 129th birthday.

== Works ==
The Fondo de Cultura Económica published his complete works in 26 volumes, titled Obras Completas de Alfonso Reyes.

=== Nonfiction ===
- Cuestiones estéticas
- El suicida
- Visión de Anáhuac
- Vísperas de España
- Cartones de Madrid
- Simpatías y diferencias
- Calendario (book)
- Homília por la cultura
- Capítulos de literatura española
- Pasado inmediato
- Estudios helénicos
- La filosofía helenística
- La X en la frente
- Memorias de cocina y bodega
- Las burlas veras
- La experiencia literaria

=== Fiction ===
- Los tres tesoros
- El plano oblicuo
- Árbol de pólvora
- Quince presencias

=== Poetry ===
- Huellas (1922)
- Pausa (1926)
- Cinco casi sonetos (1931)
- Sol de Monterrey (1932)
- Romances del Río de enero (1933)
- A la memoria de Ricardo Guiraldes (1934)
- Golfo de México (1934)
- Yerbas del tarahumara (1934)
- Minuta. Juego Poético (1935)
- Infancia (1935)
- Otra voz (1936)
- Cantata en la tumba de Federico García Lorca (1937)
- Villa de Unión (1940)
- Algunos poemas, (1925-1939) (1941)
- Romances (y afines) (1945)
- La vega y el soto (1916-1943) (1946)
- Cortesía (1909-1947) (1948)
- Cuatro poemas en torno a Monterrey (1948)
- Homero en Cuernavaca (1949)
- Poema del Cid (Traducción) (1949)
- La Iliada de Homero. Primera parte: Aquiles agraviado. Translated by Alfonso Reyes (1951)
- Obra poética (1952)
- Nueve romances sordos (1954)
- Bernardo Mandeville. El panal rumoroso o la redención de los bribones. Paráfrasis libre de Alfonso Reyes (1957)

== See also ==
- Alfonso Reyes International Prize
- Alfonso Reyes (Monterrey Metro)
- Enrique Díez Canedo, Spanish writer and translator, a friend of Alfonso Reyes who called his house in Mexico City "la Capilla Alfonsina"
