= Zárraga =

Zárraga may refer to:

- Ángel Zárraga (1886–1946), Mexican painter
- José María Zárraga (1930–2012), Spanish footballer

== See also ==
Zarraga, Iloilo
