= Still Life with Boat and Shell =

1922 painting by Ángel Zárraga

Still life with Boat and Shell
- Naturaleza muerta con barco y concha (Spanish)
- Artist: Ángel Zárraga
- Year: 1922
- Medium: Canvas
- Subject: Still life
- Dimensions: 46.3 cm × 38.3 cm (18.2 in × 15.1 in)
- Location: Museo Soumaya, Mexico City

Still Life with Boat and Shell is a painting of 1922 by the Mexican artist Ángel Zárraga.

== Description ==
Zarraga studied in the Academia de San Carlos and at the age of eighteen travelled to Europe. In the Old Continent he had the possibility to get in touch with the Avant-garde group of painters that by the time were leaving in Paris.

Once in the French capital, he participated in the foundation of the School of Paris together with artists such as Amedeo Modigliani and Maurice Utrillo.

Even if he experimented a variety of styles, he was always faithful to his own pattern. In the first decades of the twenty century, his works were characterized by an academic cut which he later abandoned for other artistic pursuits.

In this canvas dated 1922, it is possible to see how it is difficult to define his style and to collocate it inside a specific artistic movement. The brushstroke employed for the sea waves, as well as the particular relation between elements, evoke the Avant-garde influence. At the bottom right of the painting there is the signature and a dedicatory to Réne Delange [Zarraga aux Delange en toute affection (For Delange with affection)], who was an art critic that wrote the preface Dialogue over the Water [Dialogue sur l'eau] with Félix Fénéon for the Parisian exhibition Ángel Zárraga in 1921.

== Bibliography ==
- Ángel Zárraga. 1886-1946. CONACULTA-INBA. México, 2006. 1a. edición. Página 13
