= The Nude Ballerina =

Painting by Ángel Zárraga

The Nude Ballerina (1907-1909) by Ángel Zárraga

The Nude Ballerina or The Naked Dancer (Spanish - La bailarina desnuda) is a 1907-1909 oil on canvas painting by the Mexican artist Ángel Zárraga, now in the private collection of Andrés Blaisten. In its combination of a nude young woman with an old woman or grotesque, it is very similar to his The Woman and the Puppet (1909) and is probably related to it.

It and Allegory of Autumn (now in Mexico's National Museum of Art) were the two works the artist sent to an exhibition in Italy. The Italian art critic Rodolfo Panichi concentrated on the notable sobriety of its colours, on its general tone and on the vigour of its modelling. After that exhibition, Ballerina was acquired by a museum in Oran and later by its current owner.
