= Mexican Youth Athenaeum =

Civil association

The Mexican Youth Athenaeum (Spanish: Ateneo de la Juventud), later known as the Athenaeum of Mexico, was a Mexican civil association founded on October 28, 1909 with the purpose of working in favor of culture and art, by means of organization public meetings and debates. Born as a response of a generation of young intellectuals who in the decline of the rule of President Porfirio Díaz set a series of criticisms to determinism and mechanism set by the Comtian and Spencerian positivism as the development model of Porfirio Díaz's administration and the group of the científicos. Through a series of conferences and different cultural efforts they activated a reflexive awareness on education. It was an association of intellectuals, primarily writers and philosophers. Most of the members were indeed young and came to represent a new generation of Mexican scholars, reacting specifically against positivism and its prevalence in the ideology of the regime of Dictator Porfirio Diaz. The group sought a revindication of the humanities as the center of cultural creation.

The members of the Athenaeum gave to Mexican education system a wider vision which rejected racist biological determinism and which found a solution for the cost of social adjustment problem generated by the processes which change society as industrialization or urbanization.

Against the official position of Justo Sierra, porfirian minister of Instruction, and the "científicos" (pejoratively nicknamed in the Mexican slang), José Vasconcelos and the Athenaeum generation promoted criticism of the philosophical sole vision (positivism and determinism). The Athenaeum generation proposed academic freedom, freedom of thought, and overall the cultural, ethic and aesthetic values in which Latin America emerged as a political and social reality. Here is important to emphasize that one of the most important characteristics of the Porfiriato years, was its disdain for everything national, Mexican; its fascination for European, French, German or if nothing of these were possible American things and ideas, as the only way for achieving progress.

Antonio Caso, Alfonso Reyes, Pedro Henríquez Ureña, Ricardo Gomez Rebelo and José Vasconcelos along with the other members of the Youth Athenaeum set up the basis to an ambitious rescue of what is Mexican, and to set what is Latin American as an identity that besides being real, might be possible in the future and mainly non-dependent on the destruction of national, local, Latin-American, as the way to progress, as it happened under the Porfiriato and other experiments such as the Coronelismo in Brazil.

== The "Ateneo" ==
The Ateneo officially convened on the 28 of October, 1909. However, its origins are found in the Revista Savia Moderna (New Modern Journal), originally published in 1906 by Alfonso Cravioto and Luís Castillo Ledón. The second major antecedent to the Ateneo was the Sociedad de Conferencias (Society of Conferences), an inchoate form of the Ateneo de la Juventud who took as its goal to display to the public new ideas of education, poetry, the plastic arts, and philosophy. Finally, in the summer of 1909, Antonio Caso organized a series of conferences dealing with the history of Positivism, given at the National Preparatory School, an institution founded on positivist principles and source of Mexican educational since its creation in 1868.

As stated in the official statutes of the club when, in 1912, it took the name Ateneo de México, the principal goal of the association was to promote intellectual and artistic culture. The same document outlines the strategies proposed in this effort. The members held public meetings, discussions, and lectures, and published a journal. The fundamental ideology of the Ateneo was a rejection of positivistic influences on education and culture. Instead, the members of the Ateneo thought, the humanities would be responsible for the revitalization of Mexican culture, the group's ultimate concern. Members of the Ateneo such as Alfonso Reyes stressed the importance of classical scholarship and additionally looked to the works of modern continental philosophers such as Kant, Schopenhauer, Nietzsche, and Bergson, as well as Spanish writers such as Jose Ortega y Gasset, to propound new values for human societies which were contrary to scientific and positivistic trends in thought.

== Noteworthy members ==
- Alfonso Reyes
- Rafael Cabrera
- Julio Torri
- Antonio Caso
- Pedro Henríquez Ureña
- José Vasconcelos
- Alfonso Cravioto
- Luis Castillo Ledón
- Jesús T. Acevedo
- Martín Luis Guzmán
- Ricardo Gómez Robelo
- Manuel de la Parra
- Isidro Fabela
- Samuel Ramos

== Ateneo Nacional de la Juventud, A.C. ==
One hundred years after its foundation, Ateneo de la Juventud is refounded under the name Ateneo Nacional de la Juventud with the participation of young people from the main public and private universities in Mexico City. In 2011, it was consolidated as a non-partisan and non-profit Civil Association, which seeks, since then, the empowerment of young Mexicans in the public, cultural, academic and political life of Mexico.

Following the ideals of the 1909 Ateneo, this association has become an important nucleus of youth advocacy, recognized by members of civil society, government and other international organizations. Its work is characterized by the development of programs aimed at training young people in different areas ranging from the dissemination of culture and philosophy, to entrepreneurship and advocacy in public policy.

In 2009, the group launched the first edition of the Escuela de Formación Humana, a course for young people between the ages of 15 and 21, which included workshops in philosophy, art appreciation, ethics, public speaking, assertiveness and human rights. Following the ideology of the Ateneo de la Juventud of 1909, the School of Human Formation aimed to provide participants with a humanistic education and to complement their academic training in a critical manner.

In 2011, the Ateneo is constituted as a civil association under which the same project continues, made up mainly of students from the National Autonomous University of Mexico and other public institutions in Mexico City.

== Sources ==
- Biriotti, Maurice. "Alfonso Reyes." Encyclopedia of Latin American Literature. Ed. Verity Smith. Chicago: Fitzroy Dearborn, 1997.
- Conn, Robert T. The Politics of Philology: Alfonso Reyes and the Invention of the Latin American Literary Tradition. Cranbury, NJ: Associated University Presses. Rosemont Publishing and Printing Corp. 2002.
- Curiel Defosse, Fernando. Ateneo de la juventud (A-Z). Mexico City: Universidad Nacional Autonoma de México, 2001.
- Earle, Peter G. "José Vasconcelos." Encyclopedia of Latin American Literature. Ed. Verity Smith. Chicago: Fitzroy Dearborn, 1997.
- Martí, Oscar R. "Mexican Philosophy in the 19080's: Possibilities and Limits." Philosophy and Literature in Latin America. Ed. Jorge J. E. Gracia and Mireya Camurati. Albany: State University of New York Press, 1989.
- Pedraza, Jorge. Alfonso Reyes en la generación del ateneo de la juventud. Monterrey: Ayuntamiento, 1985.
- Ramos, Samuel. Profile of Man and Culture in Mexico. New York: McGraw-Hill Paperbacks. 1962.
