= Hispanidad =

Term for the cultural unity of Hispanic peoples

Hispanidad

The Hispanic flag

Hispanic countries:
- Argentina
- Bolivia
- Chile
- Colombia
- Costa Rica
- Cuba
- Dominican Republic
- Ecuador
- Equatorial Guinea
- El Salvador
- Guatemala
- Honduras
- Mexico
- Nicaragua
- Panama
- Paraguay
- Peru
- Spain
- Uruguay
- Venezuela

Non-independent but self-governing territories:

- Gibraltar (Note: Gibraltar is an unincorporated overseas territory of the United Kingdom. While English is the sole official language, Spanish is widely spoken.)
- Puerto Rico (Note: Puerto Rico is an unincorporated organized territory of the United States.)

Countries and regions sometimes included within the concept of Hispanidad:

- Andorra (Note: Spanish is widely studied and spoken mostly as a second language.)
- Aruba (Note: Spanish is spoken mostly as a second language in the ABC islands.)
- Belize (Note: The official language is English, but Hispanics make up 52.9% of the population.)
- Bonaire
- Curaçao
- Florida (Note: Florida has a significant Hispanic population. Spain colonized Florida from 1513–1822. Hispanics are the ethnic plurality in Miami, Orlando, Pensacola, St. Augustine, and Tampa.)
- Haiti (Note: The official languages are Haitian Creole and French, but Spain once had control of the country from 1492–1665 as a part of The Captaincy General of Santo Domingo, Spanish is also spoken by some Haitians especially near the Dominican border as a second language.)
- Louisiana (Note: Louisiana has a significant Hispanic population with their inhabitants called Isleños. Spain colonized Louisiana from 1762–1801.)
- Morocco (Note: Spain used to colonize Morocco between 1912 and 1956, and Spanish language remains used in Northern Morocco and former Cape Juby territory today. However, Spanish is mostly studied as a second language, while Arabic and French are more common. See Languages of Morocco.)
- Philippines (Note: The Philippines is sometimes considered part of the Hispanidad. Spanish was formerly co-official alon with Tagalog and native languages, but has few native speakers today. See Spanish language in the Philippines.)
- Sahrawi Republic (Note: Spanish is spoken mostly as a second language.)
- Southwestern United States (Note: The southwestern United States has a significant Hispanic population. Hispanics are the ethnic plurality in Arizona, California, Nevada, New Mexico, and Texas.)

Hispanidad (Spanish: [ispaniˈðað], typically translated as "Hispanicity") is a Spanish term describing a shared cultural, linguistic, or political identity among speakers of the Spanish language or members of the Hispanic diaspora. The term can have various, different implications and meanings depending on the regional, socio-political, or cultural context in which it is used.

== History ==
The Hispanic model of identity and representation has been historically characterized by its multi-faceted nature, which transcends strict racial categorizations. Numerous figures exemplify this complexity, including Martín de Porres, Beatriz de Palacios, Spanish conquistador Juan Garrido that established the first commercial wheat farm in the Americas, Estevanico, Francisco Menendez, Juan de Villanueva, Juan Valiente, Juan Beltrán de Magaña, Pedro Fulupo, Juan Bardales, Antonio Pérez, Gómez de León, Leonor Galiano, Teresa Juliana de Santo Domingo and Juan García. Additionally, Juan Latino stands out as a significant figure in this discourse; he is recognized as the first black African to attend a European university, ultimately achieving the status of professor. This highlights the notion that the Hispanic identity is not monolithic and is instead enriched by diverse contributions across racial and ethnic lines. Such examples serve to challenge simplistic perceptions of race within the historical narrative of Hispanic culture.

== Early use ==
The term has been used in the early modern period and is in the Tractado de orthographía y accentos en las tres lenguas principales by Alejo Venegas, printed in 1531, to mean "style of linguistic expression". It was used, with a similar meaning, in the 1803 edition of the Dictionary of the Spanish Royal Academy as a synonym of Hispanismo (Hispanism), which, in turn, was defined as "the peculiar speech of the Spanish language".

== Revival ==
In the early 20th century, the term was revived, with several new meanings. Its reintroduction is attributed to Miguel de Unamuno in 1909, who used the term again on 11 March 1910, in an article, La Argentinidad, published in a newspaper in Argentina, La Nación. He compared the term to other similar expressions: argentinidad, americanidad, españolidad and italianidad.

Unamuno linked the concept to the multiplicity of peoples speaking the Spanish language, which encompassed in turn his idea of La Raza, gave it an egalitarian substrate and questioned the very status of motherland for Spain; he claimed the need of approaching Hispanic American republics in terms of sisterhood (opposing "primacies" and "maternities").

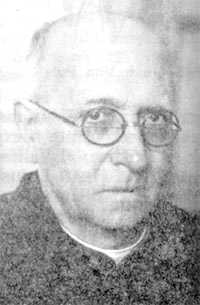
The priest Zacarías de Vizcarra spread the term in 1926

Further development of the concept had to wait for the 1920s, when a group of intellectuals was influenced by the ideas of ultranationalist French thinker Charles Maurras and rescued the term. The term was used by Spanish priest Zacarías de Vizcarra, who was living in Buenos Aires. He proposed in 1926 that the expression Fiesta de la Raza should be changed to Fiesta de la Hispanidad.

During the reign of King Alfonso XIII of Spain, the Virgin of Guadaloupe was proclaimed "Queen of the Hispanidad" in Spain. In the later years of the decade, vanguard writer Ernesto Giménez Caballero began to elaborate a neo-imperialist narrative of the Hispanidad in La Gaceta Literaria. The doctrine of Hispanidad would also become a core tenet of the reactionary thought in Spain in the coming years.

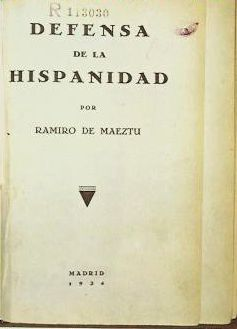
Cover of the first edition of Defensa de la Hispanidad (1934), by Ramiro de Maeztu.

During the Second Spanish Republic, Spanish monarchist author Ramiro de Maeztu, who had been the ambassador to Argentina between 1928 and 1930, considered the concept of Hispanidad, motivated by the interests aroused on him by Argentine-related topics, and the meetings between him and the attendants to the courses of Catholic culture as nationalist, Catholic and anti-liberal. Maeztu explained his doctrine of Hispanidad in his work Defensa de la Hispanidad (1934); he thought it was a spiritual world that united Spain and its former colonies by the Spanish language and Catholicism. He attributed the concept to Vizcarra, instead of Unamuno. In the Hispanidad of Maeztu, the Christian and humanist features that would identify Hispanic peoples would replace rationalism, liberalism and democracy, which he called alien to the Hispanic ethos. His work "relentlessly" linked Catholicism and Hispanidad and was highly influential with Argentine nationalists and the Spanish far right, including Francoism. Although declaredly anti-racist because of its Catholic origin, the sense of racial egalitarianism in Maeztu's idea of Hispanidad was restricted to the scope of heavenly salvation.

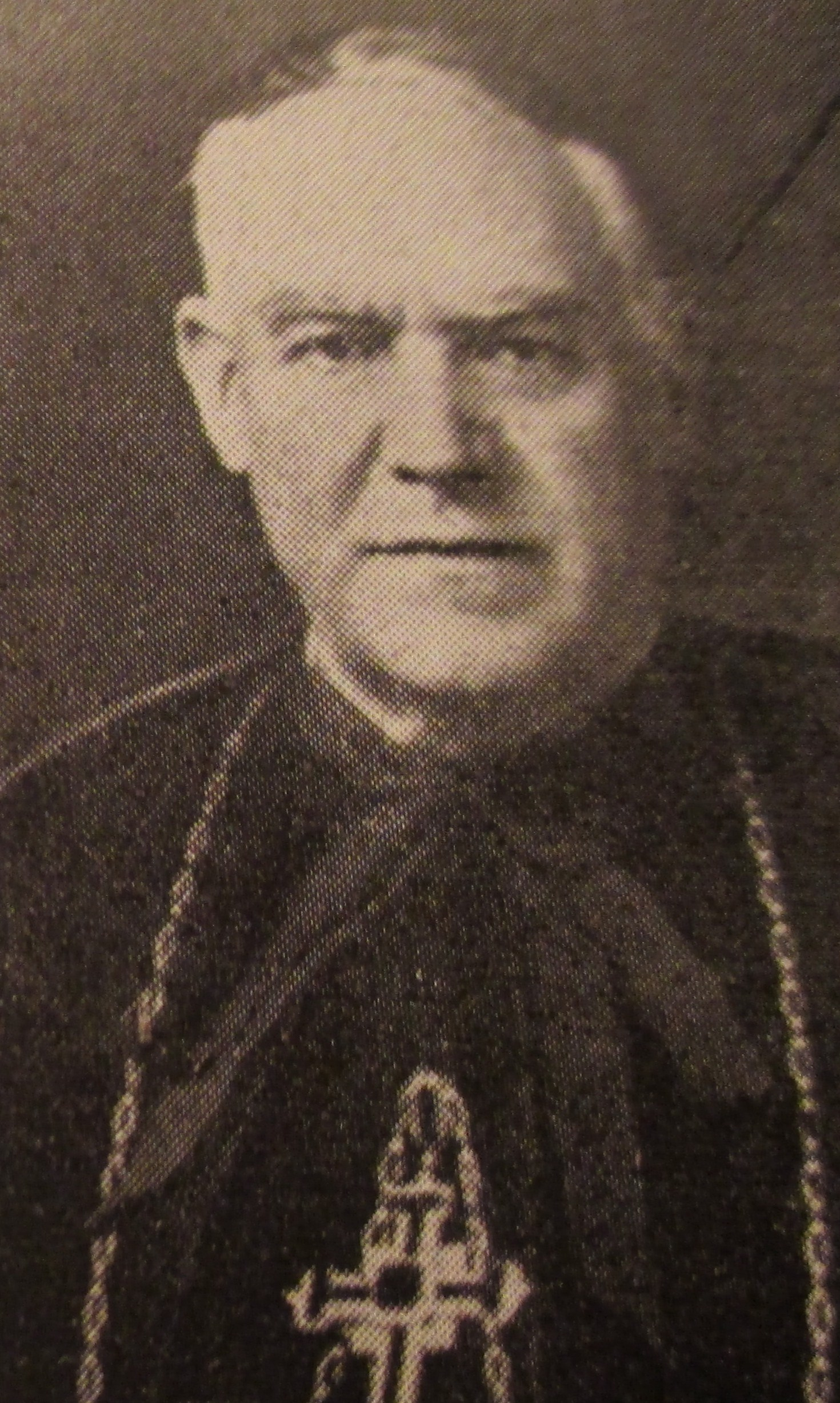
Primate Isidro Gomá y Tomás defended the ideas of Vizcarra and Maeztu.

Spanish Primate Isidro Gomá y Tomás issued in Argentina, on 12 October 1934, a Maeztu-inspired manifesto, In Support of Hispanidad:

"America is the work of Spain. This work by Spain is essentially of Catholic nature. Hence, there is a relation of equality between Hispanidad and Catholicism, and any attempt at Hispanisation which rejects it is madness".

"América es la obra de España. Esta obra de España lo es esencialmente de catolicismo. Luego hay relación de igualdad entre hispanidad y catolicismo, y es locura todo intento de hispanización que lo repudie."

— Isidro Gomá, fragment of «Apología de la Hispanidad» (Buenos Aires, 1934), collected in Acción Española (1 November 1934).

According to Stephen G. H. Roberts, Gomá linked the ideas of Maeztu and the ideology that was developed by the dictatorship of Franco.

According to the philosopher and writer Julián Marías, the Spanish American territories were not only colonies but also extensions of Spain that mixed with the native American peoples, with whom Europeans intermarried, creating a multicultural society.

== Francoist Spain ==
That narrative was heavily featured in Nationalist propaganda during the Spanish Civil War, being used as war tool. Spanish philosopher and Francoist propagandist Manuel García Morente would make Francisco Franco the saviour of the legacy of the Hispanidad from an "invisible army" that was sent by the Communist International of Moscow. García Morente would synthesize the essence of Hispanidad in the archaistic ideal of "Christian knight", half-monk and half-soldier; that figure was used in the pages of student books during the beginning of the Francoist dictatorship.

After the Spanish Civil War, the Our Lady of the Pillar became a symbol of Hispanidad in Spain and was linked to the National Catholicism of the Franco regime to the ideas of patriotism and "Hispanic essences".

Franco created the Council of the Hispanidad on 2 November 1940. It was thought at first to be a sort of supranational institution, and it ended up being a council of 74 members, charged with the task of coordinating the relations with Latin America. The Hispanidad became the source of an expansive nationalism (first imperialist and then cultural). Besides its character both as national identity element and as stalwart of Catholicism, Francoism used the Hispanidad in international relations.

The Council of the Hispanidad would become the Institute of Hispanic Culture in 1946 and change from a more Falangist profile to a more Catholic one. That happened within a framework of a general change in the doctrine of the Hispanidad between 1945 and 1947, with Alberto Martín-Artajo at the helm of the Spanish Ministry of Foreign Affairs. The message then became more defensive and less aggressive, with fewer mentions of "empire" and "race" (biological). Afterwards, later in the Francoist dictatorship, the regime, then less constrained by the international community, recovered more aggressive rhetorics, but it failed to reach the full extent of when Ramón Serrano Suñer was Minister of Foreign Affairs.

In 1958, the Day of the Race was renamed to Day of the Hispanidad in Spain. However, with regard to present-day Spain, the image of Latin American countries has been declining, slowly being replaced in popularity and geopolitical importance by other European countries, as well as other countries in the Indo-Pacific region. This is compounded by the loss of European influence (including Spain and Portugal themselves) in Latin America, which has been replaced by the influence of military powers such as China, the United States, and Russia. Furthermore, according to the Spanish population, the countries with which Spain shares the greatest similarities are Italy and Portugal, followed by Greece and France (especially its southern region), as all these countries and territories share a common Mediterranean culture. In addition, Romania is another European country, besides those already mentioned, with which Spain shares a common Latin culture.

== Mexico ==
Already in the 1930s, conservative Mexican writer Alfonso Junco had become an active propagandist of the Hispanidad. One of the key parts of the ideology of "Panista" Mexican politician Efraín González Luna, who strongly supported miscegenation, was the Hispanidad, which he conceived in terms of a united community of sovereign states that defended their own values from foreign threats like communism. Other opponents of post-revolutionary Mexico, who spread the doctrine of the Hispanidad were Miguel Palomar y Vizcarra, Jesús Guisa y Azevedo, Salvador Abascal, and Salvador Borrego. The National Synarchist Union saw in the Hispanidad a key component of the vitality of the Mexican nation.

== Spanish exiles ==
The idea of Hispanidad was also featured with new meanings in authors of the Spanish Republic in exile, such as Fernando de los Ríos, Joaquín Xirau, Eduardo Nicol and Américo Castro. Salvador de Madariaga, also exiled, defended the Hispanidad as a positive factor towards cultural ontogeny; he believed its miscegenation was much better than the Anglo-Saxon example.

== Argentina ==
In Argentina, one of the few countries with good relations with Francoist Spain after the end of World War II, President Juan Domingo Perón defended the concept of Hispanidad by highlighting the Hispanic roots of Argentina. However, Peronism began to detach itself from the idea from 1950 to 1954 period to replace it with Latinidad (Latinity).

== Other countries ==
In Colombia, Eduardo Carranza used the idea of Hispanidad in his work. In Chile, Jaime Eyzaguirre would do the same. In Peru, diplomat Víctor Andrés Belaúnde held that Peru was essentially a mestizo and Spanish nation and due to this its people "gravitated" towards what was "Hispanic".

Hispanidad, which is independent of race, is the only ethnic category, as opposed to racial category, which is officially collated by the United States Census Bureau. The distinction made by government agencies for those within the population of any official race category, such as "Black", is between those who report Hispanic backgrounds and all others who do not. In this system, "Non-Hispanic Blacks" consist of an ethnically diverse collection of all others who are classified as Black or African American that do not report Hispanic ethnic backgrounds.

== See also ==
- Panhispanism
- Spanish nationalism
- Breve Historia de México
- Hispanismo
- Hispanic eugenics
- Limpieza de sangre
- Spanish-speaking world
- Traditionalist conservatism

== Notes ==
By ISO 639-3 code
Enter an ISO code to find the corresponding language article.
