= Capilla Alfonsina =

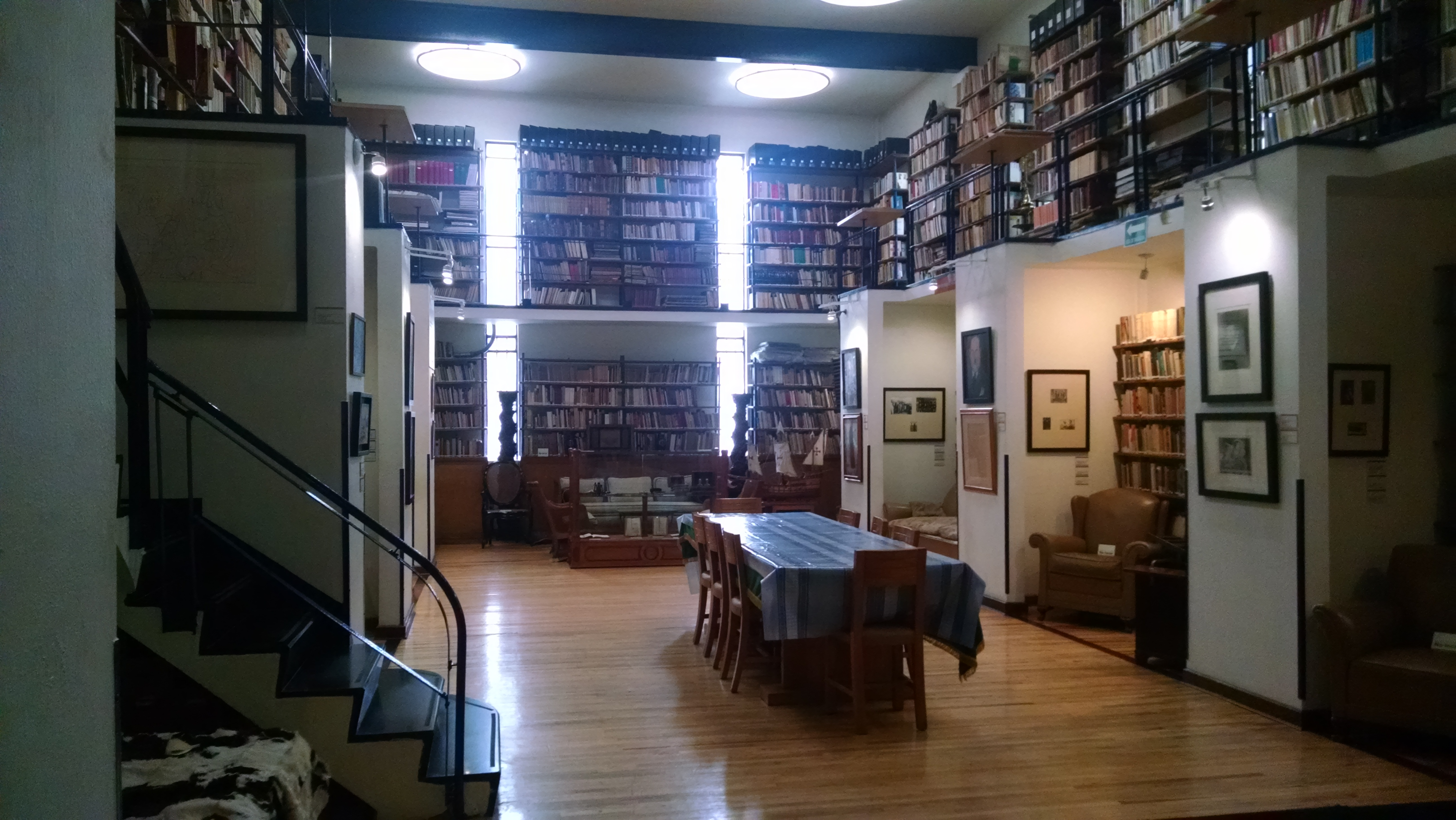
- Established: 1973 (Note: Hadatty Mora and Crónica (2017) give 1973. A 2022 Crónica report dates Alicia Reyes's tenure to 1972, and the institution marked its 50th anniversary in 2022.)
- Location: Benjamín Hill 122, Condesa, Mexico City, Mexico
- Coordinates: 19.408°N 99.1785°W
- Type: Historic house museum, library
- Director: Javier Garciadiego (as of 2022)
- Architect: Carlos Rousseau
- Owner: Instituto Nacional de Bellas Artes y Literatura
- Public transit access: Patriotismo (Line 9)
- Website: capillaalfonsina.inba.gob.mx

The Capilla Alfonsina (lit. 'Alfonsine Chapel') is a historic house museum, library and centre for literary studies in the former home of the Mexican writer and diplomat Alfonso Reyes, who lived there from 1939 until his death on 27 December 1959. It stands at 122 Benjamín Hill Street, between Tacámbaro and Gómez Palacio streets, in the Colonia Condesa of Mexico City, near Patriotismo metro station.

== History ==
Reyes sketched the design himself: a library on two floors, with a mezzanine for receiving friends. The architect Carlos Rousseau, of the Rousseau firm of Monterrey, built it in the functionalist style in 1938–39. (Note: Hadatty Mora gives 1938 as the year of construction; the Mexico City government's tourism site says construction was completed in 1939.) Reyes moved in on retiring from the diplomatic service. The house became a gathering place for writers including Octavio Paz, Carlos Fuentes and Pablo Neruda. Its name was coined by Reyes's friend, the Spanish writer Enrique Díez Canedo, one of its most frequent visitors, who saw it as a temple of learning.

After Reyes's death, his widow Manuela and their son Alfonso looked after the house. In 1973 the literature department of the National Institute of Fine Arts (INBA) took charge of it, with Reyes's granddaughter Alicia Reyes as director. That year the first Alfonso Reyes International Prize was presented there, to Jorge Luis Borges. Alicia Reyes ran the Capilla for more than four decades and taught its literature courses for over thirty years; she died in October 2019.

In April 2017 the historian Javier Garciadiego, a former president of El Colegio de México and a scholar of Reyes's work, was named director. As of June 2022, he remained in charge, and moderated a public discussion that month marking the institution's 50th anniversary. At that event, the historian Alberto Enríquez Perea described Reyes's gift of his house, library, manuscripts, art and personal effects to the Mexican nation as exceptional in the Spanish-speaking world.

== Collections and activities ==
The Capilla is administered by INBA under Mexico's Secretariat of Culture. Its library centres on Reyes's personal collection, alongside his correspondence, photographs, paintings, lithographs and family objects. The art collection includes works by Mexican and foreign artists such as Julio Ruelas, Manuel Rodríguez Lozano and José Moreno Villa. The house hosts conferences, seminars, book presentations and literature courses, and serves as a reading room for researchers consulting Reyes's books and letters. As of 2022, the courses were led by Beatriz Saavedra.
