= Girl with Cherry Tart =

Painting by Ángel Zárraga

- Niña con tarta de cerezas (Spanish)
- Artist: Ángel Zárraga
- Year: 1916–1922
- Medium: Canvas
- Subject: Still life
- Dimensions: 55 cm × 46 cm (22 in × 18 in)
- Location: Museo Soumaya, Mexico City

Girl with Cherry Tart is a painting by Mexican artist Ángel Zárraga in 1922. Both its brushstroke and geometric figures allows us to ascribe this canvas to the Cubism. This oil painting depicts a young lady looking at a cherry pie in an intimate scene. The dominant tones cover the scale of red. The lady is watching the cake with her eyes closed in a proper position.

== The Artist ==
Angel Zárraga studied at the "Escuela Nacional de Bellas Artes (ENBA)" with Diego Rivera and Saturnino Herrán. The artist Pablo Picasso referred to him with this words: I had a Mexican friend who I loved very much. An intelligent, fine and knowledgeable man. He was even a painter [...] Ángel Zárraga. A gentleman.

When Ángel Zárraga died in 1946, the writer Salvador Novo wrote in his column Novedades [News]: He was characterized by a European prestige, even greater when he came back[...] He made no concessions to the art tendencies he found when he came back to his country.

The painter returned to Mexico in 1941 sent to the inhabitants of Durango, his original city, a message: My friends, people from Durango, this faith of mine, this hope of mine, are the only gift I bring to you, because my works on canvas and walls are despicable things and therefore perishable. What is immortal, are the faith and the hope in my Indian Mexico, Spanish and catholic, and in my Indian Durango, Basque and catholic.
