= Breve historia de México =

Breve historia de México (A Brief history of Mexico) is a work published in 1937 by the Mexican writer, philosopher, academic and politician José Vasconcelos Calderón, who was a presidential candidate in 1929. In this work, Vasconcelos, maintains narrative of historical events but at the same time of confrontation with the ruling party in Mexico, demanding a return to true revolutionary values, which according to Vasconcelos had been betrayed and corrupted, and he presented a review of national history. Unlike earlier Vasconcelos works such as La Raza Cósmica (where he praised both Hispanist and Indigenist elements which make up the Mexican culture), in Breve historia de México he stresses the importance of the Spanish part of Mexican culture, including cultural, moral, spiritual and traditional values which gave origin of Mexico. It is one of the most important revisionist works of Mexican and Latin American history.

== Description ==
The work expresses a revisionism, criticism and demystification of the official liberal and post-1910 revolutionary Mexican history version from the pre-Hispanic civilizations, the New Spain, post-independence and post-revolutionary periods, which was culminated by the post-revolutionary governments and authors, which according to Vasconcelos acted in favor of national interests of the United States, particularly those who helped to propagate an indigenist propaganda and imported the "Anglo-Saxon Black Legend" to Mexico which attacked, denied and tried to wipe out all forms of Hispanidad and the Spanish cultural, religious and institutional legacy in Mexico. He accused 19th-century Mexican liberals of sowing the seeds of the hispanophobe by the influence of the United States. Vasconcelos affirmed that the history of Mexico had been manipulated by "strange hands," particularly in favor of the interests of the United States and England and to the detriment of Mexicans, Latin Americans and Spaniards, stating that most of the republican rulers in Mexico had been directly by and with the approval of Washington. Vasconcelos stated that they created a Mexican version of the Black Legend to blame the Spaniards for all the problems of Mexico, while the United States governments in collaboration with the British represented the real threat to Mexico and Spain and had a major influence in Mexican liberal governments.

"And the most serious moral damage that the new imperialists have done to us is to create the figure of Hernán Cortés as a stranger to Mexico. In spite of the fact that Cortés is ours, in a higher degree of what Cuauhtémoc can be. The figure of the Conquistador covers the homeland of the Mexicans, from Sonora to Yucatán and beyond in the territories lost by us, won by Cortés. On the other hand, Cuauhtemoc is, at most, the ancestor of the otomí people of the Anáhuac plateau, without any relation to the rest of the country." —José Vasconcelos

In Brief History of Mexico, Vasconcelos, was a strong defender of Hispanist values and the Spanish legacy in Mexico and the Ibero-American countries and criticized the Anglo-American interference during and after the independence of the Spanish colonies in America. For Vasconcelos, the Viceroyalty of New Spain, Viceroyalty of Peru, Viceroyalty of the Río de la Plata, Viceroyalty of New Granada were not real colonies but rather independent, autonomous kingdoms inside a Greater Spain and stated that these viceroyalties were the origin of the present-day Ibero-American countries and the pre-Hispanic Aztec, Maya and Inca civilizations were not the real origin but a cultural and ethnic element which created an ethnocultural Mestizaje during the colonial period, and that post-independence liberal governments would use it as a political instrument, whose negation of Hispanidad is justified by the valuation of the movements of independence, which in the light of indigenist historiography, should appear as a reconquest of national freedom.

Vasconcelos coined the term Poinsettism, originated in reference to Joel Roberts Poinsett, to designate any act of political or cultural interference by the United States in Latin America. Poinsett was the first special agent of the United States in independent Mexico. Vasconcelos accused Poinsettism of treason to the country in favor of the interests of the United States, the Poinsett Plan, which had several objectives, among them weakening the Mexican economy and institutions to create national divisions and civil wars, which would led the annexation by the United States of the territories of Texas, California and New Mexico. Vasconcelos states that these American and English agents will act in the same way throughout Latin America. «When we missed Spain, the disaster of 1947 occurred». He mentions that liberal politician Valentín Gómez Farías was instrumental in the development of these reforms, which he qualifies as anti-Mexican, and would be equally subsequently applied to Benito Juárez, preferable in the first place to the United States. He also accuses Poinsettist agents of creating the Indigenist Myth, which was a disguise of the Anglo-Saxons, whose anti-Spanish and anti-Catholic discursives were intended to weaken the Mexican national identity, cause divisions among the Indigenous peoples, Mestizos, Criollos and Spaniards, which also intended to attack ecclesiastical Catholic institutions in favor of Protestantism. He stated that post-revolutionary indigenism and anti-Spanish propaganda was a myth invented propagated by "Prescott and American historians", which unravelled that indirect agents of Protestantism whose objective was to erase all the trace of everything Spanish in the Americas. Similarly condemns the Black Legend created and propagated in the Anglo-Saxon countries to denigrate and discredit Spain and all its cultural contributions in the Americas and in the world, including the integration of the indigenous people to the Western civilization, the formation of new countries and the expansion of the Castilian language and Catholicism. Vasconcelos claimed that the Indigenous peoples did not want the independence of Mexico, and that the main promoters of it were Criollos (Mexicans of full Spanish ancestry) like Miguel Hidalgo, who had been influenced by "other people's ideas" inculcated by the enemies of Spain and Catholicism.

Vasconcelos praises the role of the Minister of Foreign Affairs, Lucas Alamán (considered to be one of the most brilliant minds behind Conservatism in Mexico), who sought all type of reconciliation with Spain and the promoted the strengthening, integration, unity and to establish a political and military alliance of the newly independent Ibero-American nations and to establish a sort of Spanish Commonwealth, a plan that sympathized with the liberal president Simon Bolivar from the Gran Colombia. However, Alamán disagreed with the latter regarding the inclusion of United States to such alliance and in relation of Masonic lodges and non-Catholics interests over the national and Catholic ones. On the Spanish-American alliance, Vasconcelos mentions that it would have been possible to counter any political interference by the United States and England in the continent.

The long-standing hispanophobe Anglo-Saxon conflict origins predominates according to Vasconcelos as an axis in history with subsequent events and goes through the independence. He traces its roots from the sixteenth century Europe at least, and would be later extended to the New World, where the enmity is prolonged to the present time, being originated in Great Britain as part of the English and Irish Reformations under King Henry VIII and the Scottish Reformation led by John Knox, such British anti-Catholicism would be then expanded into anti-Spanish feeling, to be subsequently exported to the United States. Acting through agents throughout all Spanish America is how they succeeded in sowing discord and creating divisions. In the Americas continent, including Mexico's war of 1847 with the United States and the loss of the territories of Mexico or the defeat of Spain in 1898 in the Spanish–American War which resulted in the Spanish loss of Cuba, Puerto Rico and Philippines. Vasconcelos declares the British interference and support for the Insurgents in the Independence of Spanish South American nations, the meddling in the politics of Mexico's and Central American countries (by the US) and the meddling in South American countries (by the British Empire) and the subsequent Monroe Doctrine and Manifest destiny of the United States and the British Empire as an extension of the wider Anglo-Spanish Wars in the Old World between Protestant Britons and Catholic Spaniards. He mentions that "it was Europe, the first stage of the deep conflict, it was defined there and we ultimately had to lose in the Americas."

"The new Congress, dominated by minions of Poinsett, excited Comonfort not to temporize. An old lackey of Santa Anna, Miguel Lerdo de Tejada, formulated a disentailment's law of corporate assets. The law postulated the absurd principle, never put into practice in any civilized people, that private corporations could not own real estate. With this they were destroying private foundations, schools, universities, hospitals. None of this mattered to the fury of the Jacobean bombardment from New Orleans. The word corporations was used to disguise religious hatred, but with the certainty that almost all corporations were of an ecclesiastical nature. »José Vasconcelos

On the War of Reform and through the application of the laws of reform, that caused the destruction of educational institutions that there were in Mexico (at that time in charge of the church), and as result the number of illiterate people increased, besides that many hospitals and convents were looted and destroyed. According to Vasconcelos, Poinsett agents close to liberal presidents such as Benito Juárez played a role in increasing illiteracy which was part of the Poinsett Plan to stop the progress of the nation.

He would continue stating that the United States will continue to act through special agents and ambassadors throughout the 20th century, whom he calls "Poinsettists," such as Henry Lane Wilson (accused of planning the assassination plot of Francisco I. Madero) and Dwight Morrow (active in the Cristero rebellion and oil negotiation, whom Vasconcelos calls "the most effective Poinsett of the twentieth century"), to achieve his plans of creating divisions in the country, civil wars and the application of neoliberal reforms that would be responsible for bringing ruin to the economy of Mexico, moving away from the objectives of the Mexican Revolution of 1910. One of the other objectives that they had, he says, was the application of the agrarian reform, which considerably affected the Mexican countryside, making the country even more dependent on the United States. He also reproached for electoral fraud the election of 1929, of which he was an independent candidate, which led to the presidency of Pascual Ortiz Rubio, of the PNR party.

== See also ==
- Hispanidad
- Hispanismo
- La Raza Cósmica
- Indigenismo in Mexico

== Bibliography ==
- Vasconcelos, José (1937), Brief history of Mexico, Mexico, p. 581, ISBN 9682449243
- Matute, Rivero Serrano, Donís, Álvaro, Octavio, Martha (1937), José Vasconcelos: de su vida y su obra, Mexico: Dirección General de Difusión Cultural, Dirección Editorial/UNAM, 1984, p. 252, ISBN 9688373923
