= Antonio Caso Andrade =

Mexican philosopher and rector (1883–1946)

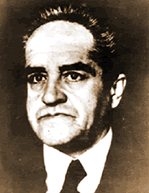
- Mexican Philosopher
- Born: November 26, 1861; Mexico City, Mexico
- Died: March 6, 1946 (aged 62); Mexico City, Mexico
- Education: National Autonomous University of Mexico
- Known for: 7th and 11th Rector of National Autonomous University of Mexico
- Scientific career
- Fields: Philosophy, Law
- Workplaces: National Autonomous University of Mexico

Antonio Caso Andrade (December 19, 1883 – March 6, 1946) was a Mexican philosopher and rector of the former Universidad Nacional de México, nowadays known as the National Autonomous University of Mexico from December 1921 to August 1923. Along with José Vasconcelos, he founded the Ateneo de la Juventud, a humanist group against philosophical positivism. The Athenian generation opposed Auguste Comte and Herbert Spencer's philosophical views, giving credence to and expanding on the ideas of Henri Bergson, Schopenhauer, Nietzsche, and José Enrique Rodó. Caso opposed rationalism. His group the ateneistas believed in a moral, willing, and spiritual individual being. He was the older brother of archaeologist Alfonso Caso.

== Philosophical Work ==
In the summer of 1909, Caso presented his critiques of positivism in a series of conferences later expanded in the third edition by the Athenians of Youth. He was inspired by the Christian philosophical tradition, in particular by Blaise Pascal and Tolstoy. Caso distinguishes three aspects of human existence: economic, aesthetic, and moral. Caso refuted Gabino Barreda's and Justo Sierra's thesis that the future of Mexico was built primarily on basis of a scientific doctrine. In the work "Catholicism, Jacobinism and Positivism", included in the book Discursos a la nacion mexicana (Discourses to the Mexican nation), Caso deepens his criticism of two of the hegemonic ideologies in the late nineteenth century: Jacobinism (or extreme liberalism) and positivism. The supporters of the first accuse them of ignoring reality, while those in the second get the blame for the alleged inevitability of reality. Antonio Caso is a pioneer in the Mexican philosophy that was developed later by Samuel Ramos, Leopoldo Zea Aguilar and Octavio Paz, among others. In his book El problema de México y la ideología nacional (The problem of Mexico and the nation ideology) published in 1924, Caso argues Mexico's biggest problem is the lack of unity (racial, cultural and social). Towards the end of his life, Caso was influenced by the philosophies of Scheler, Heidegger and, especially, Husserl, whose ideas were reflected in the book La filosofía de Husserl, El acto ideatorio, La persona humana y el estado totalitario, y El peligro del hombre (The Philosophy of Husserl, The Ideational Act, The Individual and the Totalitarian State, and The Danger of Man).

== Works ==
- La filosofía de la intuición, 1914 The philosophy of intuition, 1914
- El concepto de la historia universal, 1918 The concept of universal history, 1918
- Sociología genética y sistemática, 1927 Genetic and Systematic Sociology, 1927
- Principios de estética, 1925 Principles of aesthetics, 1925
- El acto ideatorio, 1934 The ideational act, 1934
- El peligro del hombre, 1942 The danger of man, 1942
