= Justo Sierra =

Mexican writer and political figure (1848–1912)

Justo Sierra Méndez
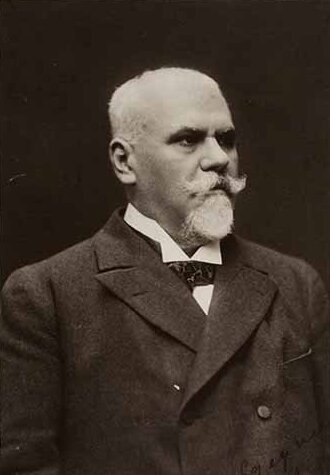

Secretary of Public Instruction and Fine Arts
- In office April 25, 1905 – March 24, 1911
- President: Porfirio Díaz
- Preceded by: Position established
- Succeeded by: Jorge Vera Estañol

Associate Justice of the Supreme Court of Justice of the Nation
- In office October 1, 1894 – September 30, 1900

Deputy of the Congress of the Union for Sinaloa's 1st district
- In office September 16, 1884 – September 15, 1894
- Preceded by: Bernardo Reyes
- Succeeded by: Federico Vicente Riva Palacio

Deputy of the Congress of the Union for Sinaloa's 2nd district
- In office September 16, 1882 – September 15, 1884
- Preceded by: Bernardo Reyes
- Succeeded by: Marcos Carrillo

Personal details
- Born: January 26, 1848 Campeche, Mexico
- Died: September 13, 1912 (aged 64) Madrid, Spain
- Resting place: Panteón de Dolores

Justo Sierra Méndez (January 26, 1848 – September 13, 1912) was a Mexican prominent liberal writer, historian, journalist, poet and political figure during the Porfiriato, in the second half of the nineteenth century and early twentieth century. He was a leading voice of the Científicos, "the scientists" who were the intellectual leaders during the regime of Porfirio Díaz. Sierra's portrait appeared on the 2000 Mexican pesos banknote issued between 1985 and 1989.

== Life and career ==
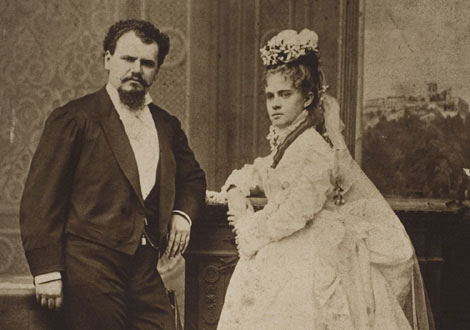
Sierra married Luz Mayora in 1874.

He was the son of Mexican novelist Justo Sierra O'Reilly, who is credited with inspiring his son with the spirit of literature. Sierra moved to Mexico City at the age of 13 in 1861, the year of his father's death, and also, coincidentally, the year of the French intervention in Mexico. Together with his fellow young students, Sierra responded with patriotic fervor to the invasion of his country, and became a lifelong militant liberal.

His most enduring works are sociopolitical histories (at times verging on memoirs) of the era of Benito Juárez and Porfirio Díaz, particularly his political biography of Juárez and his Evolución política del pueblo mexicano. Antonio Caso is considered the definitive statement of the age of the Reform in Mexico. Sierra was elected a member of the Mexican Academy of Language in 1887, and served as the Academy's sixth director from 1910 until his death in 1912.

=== Public service ===
Elected to several terms as a representative in the federal Chamber of Deputies, Sierra also served the government in various posts. From 1905 to 1911, he agreed to serve as the Secretary of Public Education under the Díaz regime. However, he never made a secret of his liberal sympathies and his distaste for the politics of the authoritarian regime. After the overthrow of Díaz in May 1911 and the election of Francisco I. Madero at the outset of the Mexican Revolution, Madero chose Sierra to serve as the Mexican ambassador to Spain. Sierra died from an aneurysm in Madrid in 1912 while serving in his post. His remains were returned to Mexico, where president Madero presided over his magnificent funeral.

=== Historian ===
Justo Sierra made significant contributions to the writing of Mexican history. His texts on pre-revolutionary Mexico continued to be used in Mexican public schools even after the Mexican Revolution. President Álvaro Obregón's Minister of Public Education, José Vasconcelos republished Sierra's Historia Patria for use in schools.

== Selected works ==
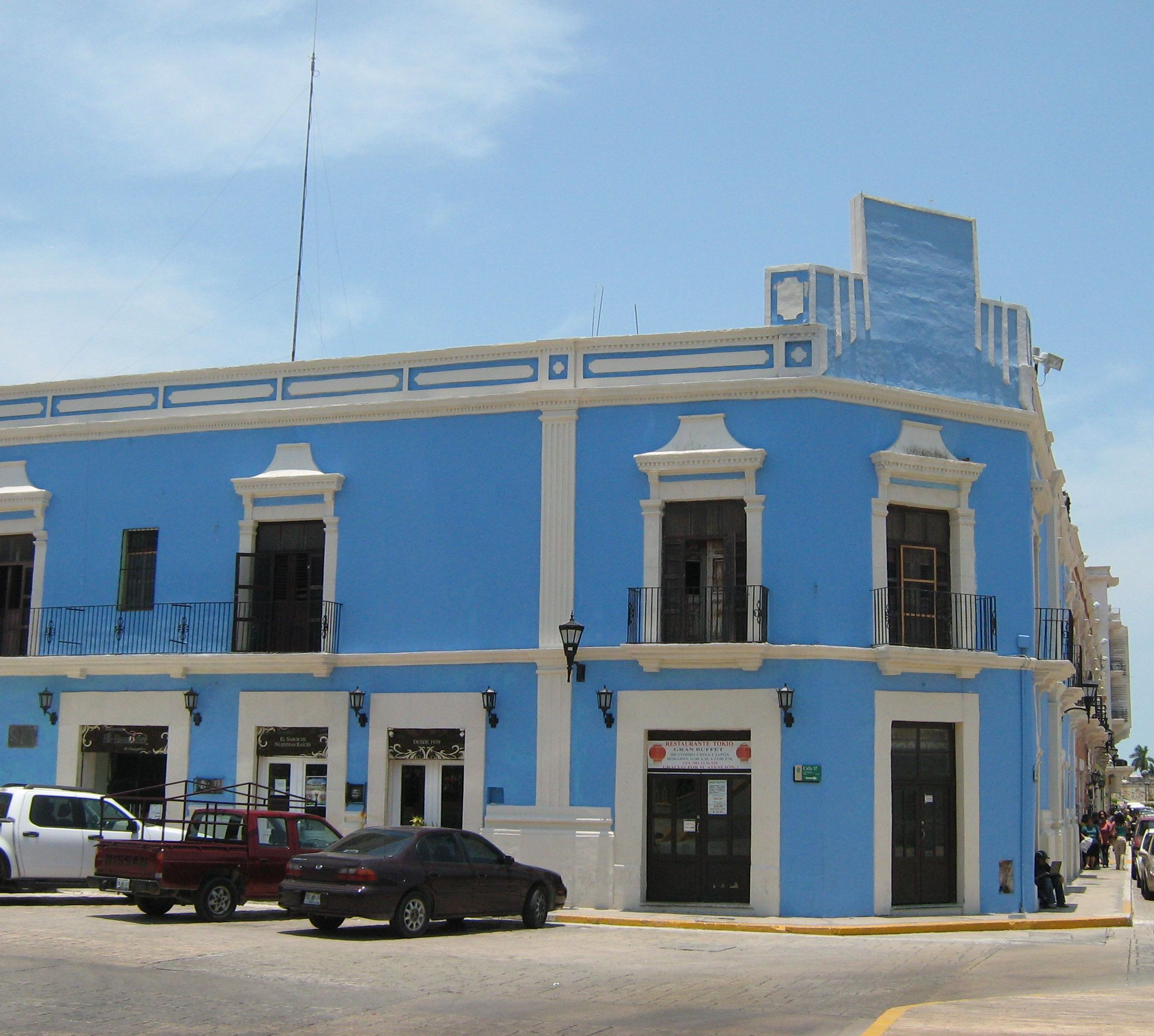
Birthplace in San Francisco de Campeche

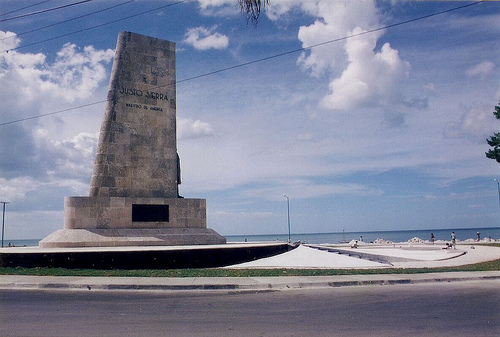
Monument erected in memory of Justo Sierra in Campeche

- Compendio de historia general, México, 1878
- Compendio de la historia de la antigüedad, México, 1880
- Confesiones de un pianista, México, 1882
- Historia general, México, 1891
- Cuentos románticos, México, 1896, 1934, 1946
- Juárez. Su obra y su tiempo, México, 1905–1906
- Historia de México. La Conquista. La Nueva España, Madrid, 1917
- Prosas, México, 1917
- Poemas, México, 1917
- Discursos, México, 1918
- Poesías, 1842-1912, México, 1938
- Evolución política del pueblo mexicano, México, 1941
- Justo Sierra. Prosas, México, 1939
- Obras completas, XV vols., México, 1948-1949.

== See also ==
- Mexican literature
