= Ángel Zárraga =

Mexican painter (1886–1946)

Ángel Zárraga (y) Argüelles
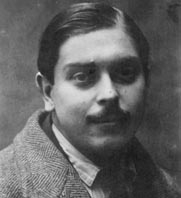
- Born: August 16, 1886; Victoria de Durango
- Died: September 22, 1946 (aged 60)
- Education: Escuela Nacional de Bellas Artes
- Known for: Paintings
- Movement: Mexican muralism

Ángel Zárraga (y) Argüelles (August 16, 1886 in Victoria de Durango – September 22, 1946) was a Mexican painter. He was a founding member of the cultural organization El Ateneo de la Juventud. His work was part of the art competitions at the 1928 Summer Olympics and the 1932 Summer Olympics.

== Biography ==
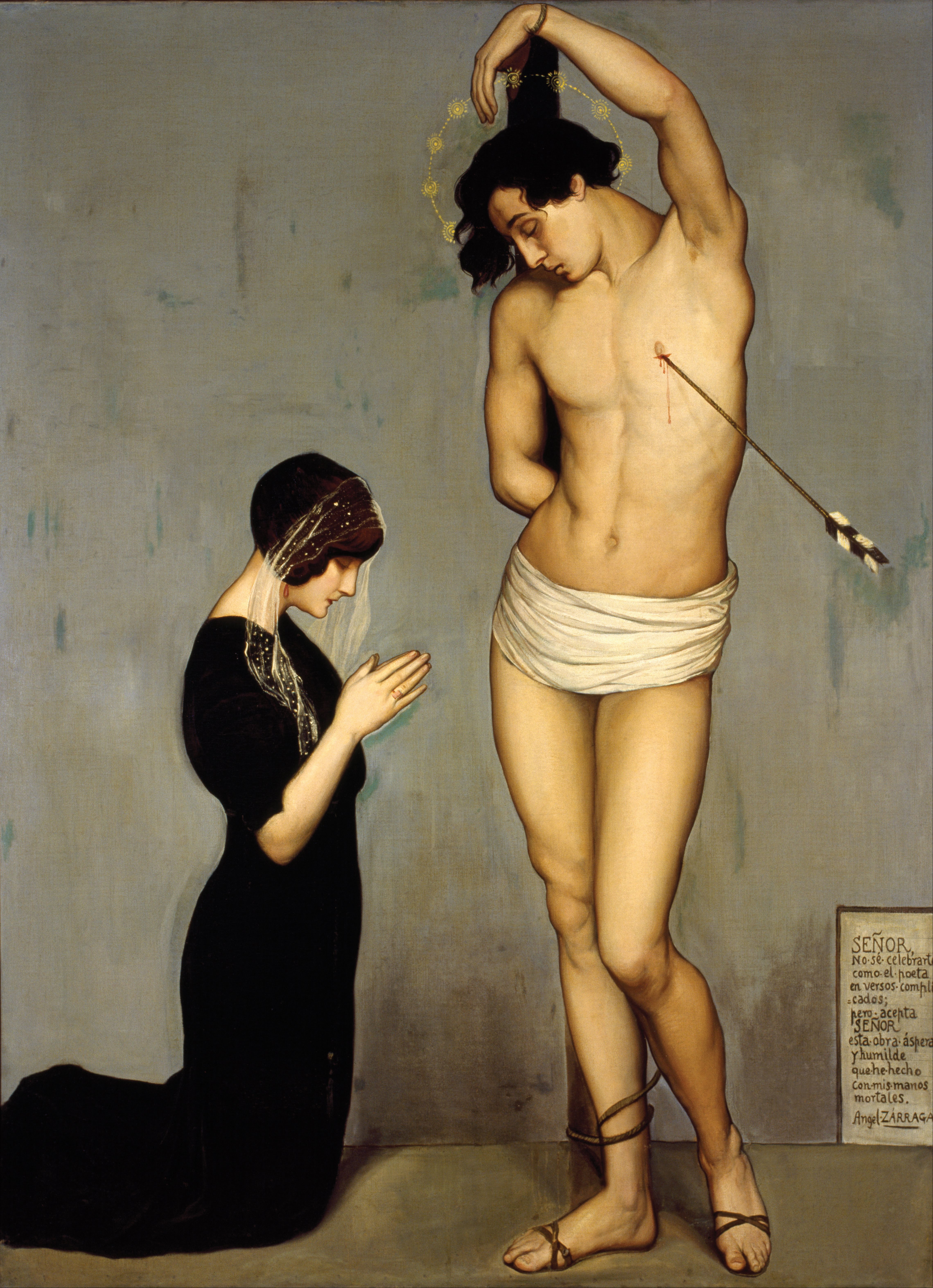
Zárraga's 1912 Ex Voto, with Saint Sebastian

Zárraga was born the son of the physician Dr. Fernando Zárraga and his wife Guadalupe Argüelles in the Barrio de Analco of Durango. While attending the Escuela Nacional Preparatoria in Mexico City, he made his first contacts with the prevailing artistic and intellectual scene, and later studied at the Escuela Nacional de Bellas Artes (ENBA). His family made possible for him a study trip to Europe in 1904, where he visited and exhibited in Spain, France and Italy. He also visited courses at the Royal Academies for Science and the Arts of Belgium.

In 1906 he exhibited some of his pictures in the Museo del Prado, and in 1907 in an exhibition of the ENBA. He participated in the 1909 Biennale di Venezia and exhibited in the Salon at the Piazzale Donatello, Florence. In 1911 he moved to France for good, and he only returned to Mexico once at the outbreak of World War II for a short time.

From 1914 Zárraga painted in a Cubist style and after 1921 his work was influenced by Cézanne and Giotto. For example, his 1922 painting Girl with Cherry Tart exhibits Cubist tendencies. He also painted murals at the Château de Vert-Cœur and in the Cité Internationale Universitaire de Paris, and decorated the Mexican embassy in Paris. He also exhibited at the Salon d'Automne, as well as in New York City. As a result of the collapse of the international art market he lost his sponsors and became depressed. During World War II he returned to his home country in 1941, where he painted murals at the Club de Banqueros and in Monterrey Cathedral. He died of pneumonia. A museum of contemporary art in Durango is named after him.

The Nude Ballerina, between 1907 and 1909

Woman and puppet, 1909

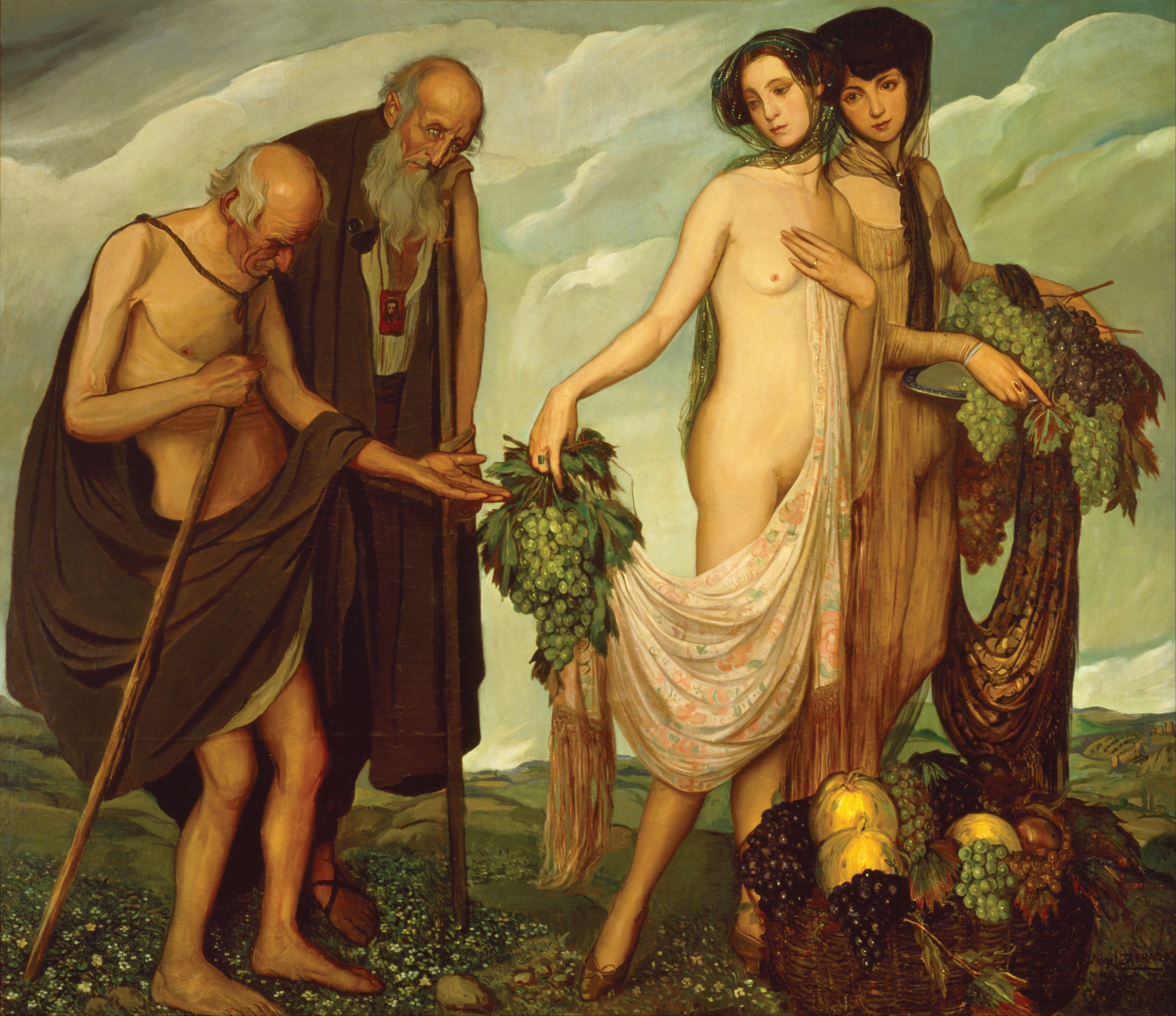
In, 1910

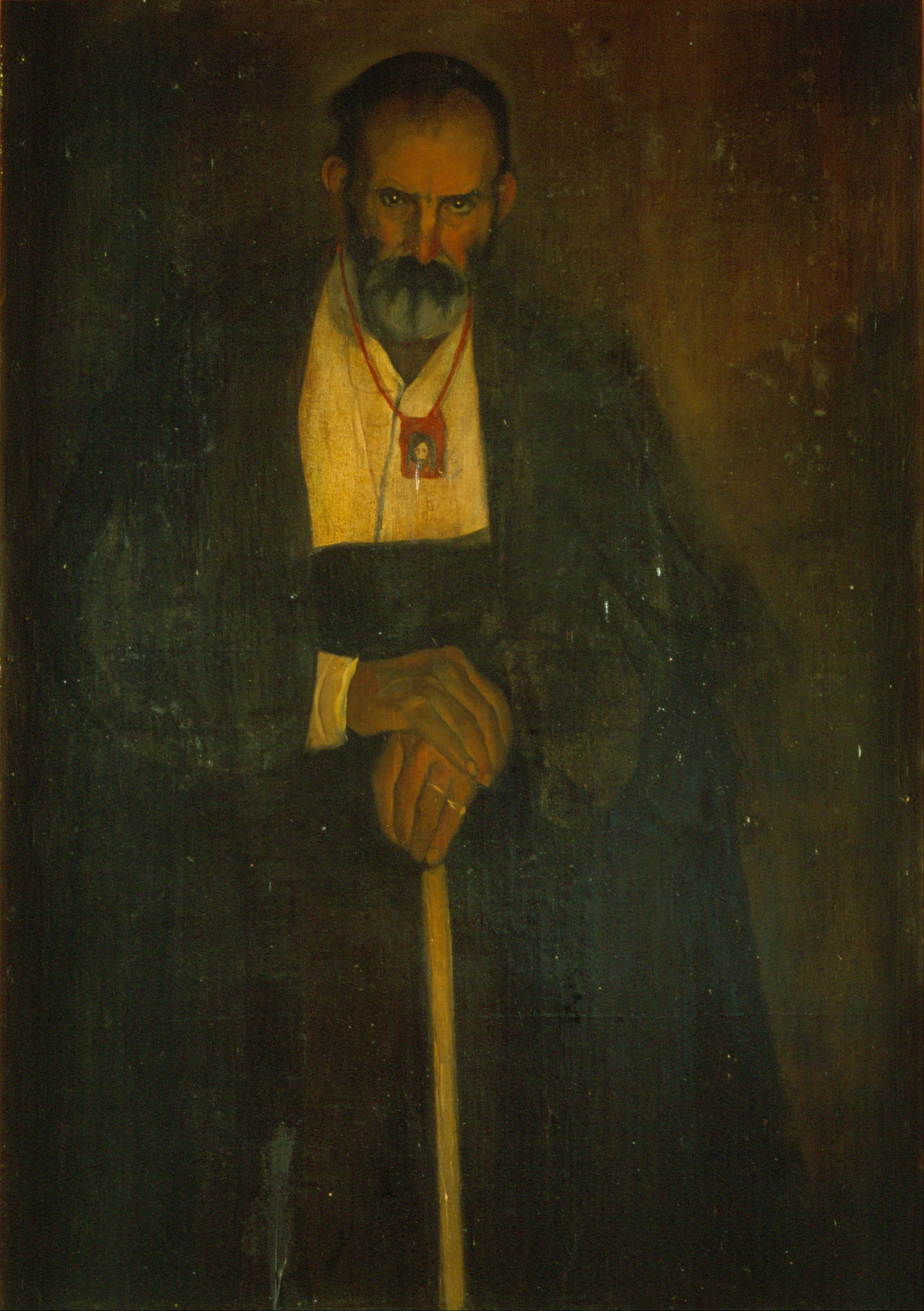
The old one with the stick

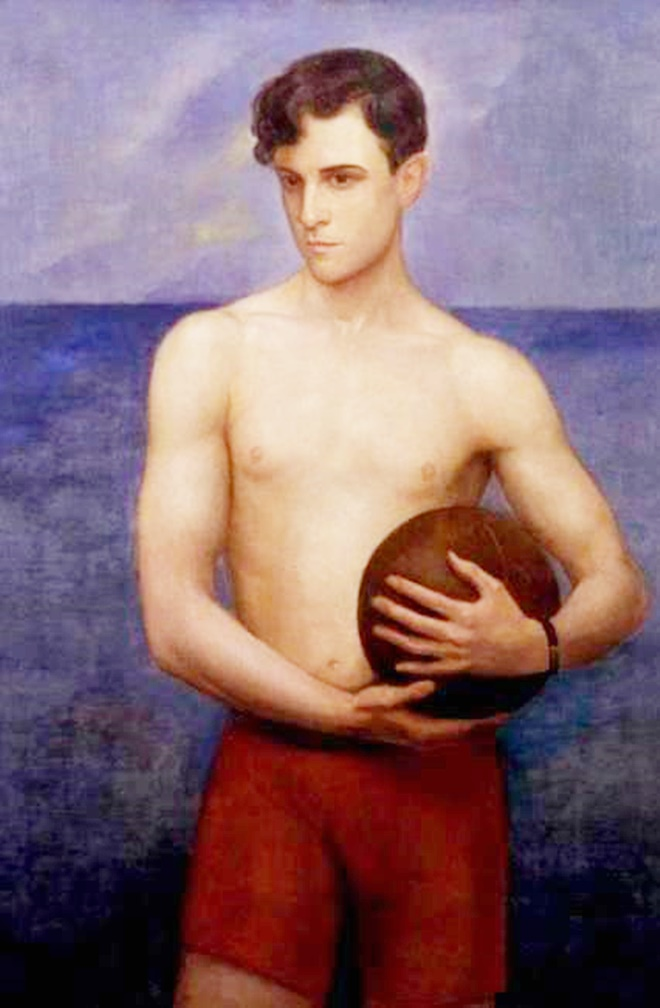
Picture of Ramon Novarro, 1929 (oil on canvas)

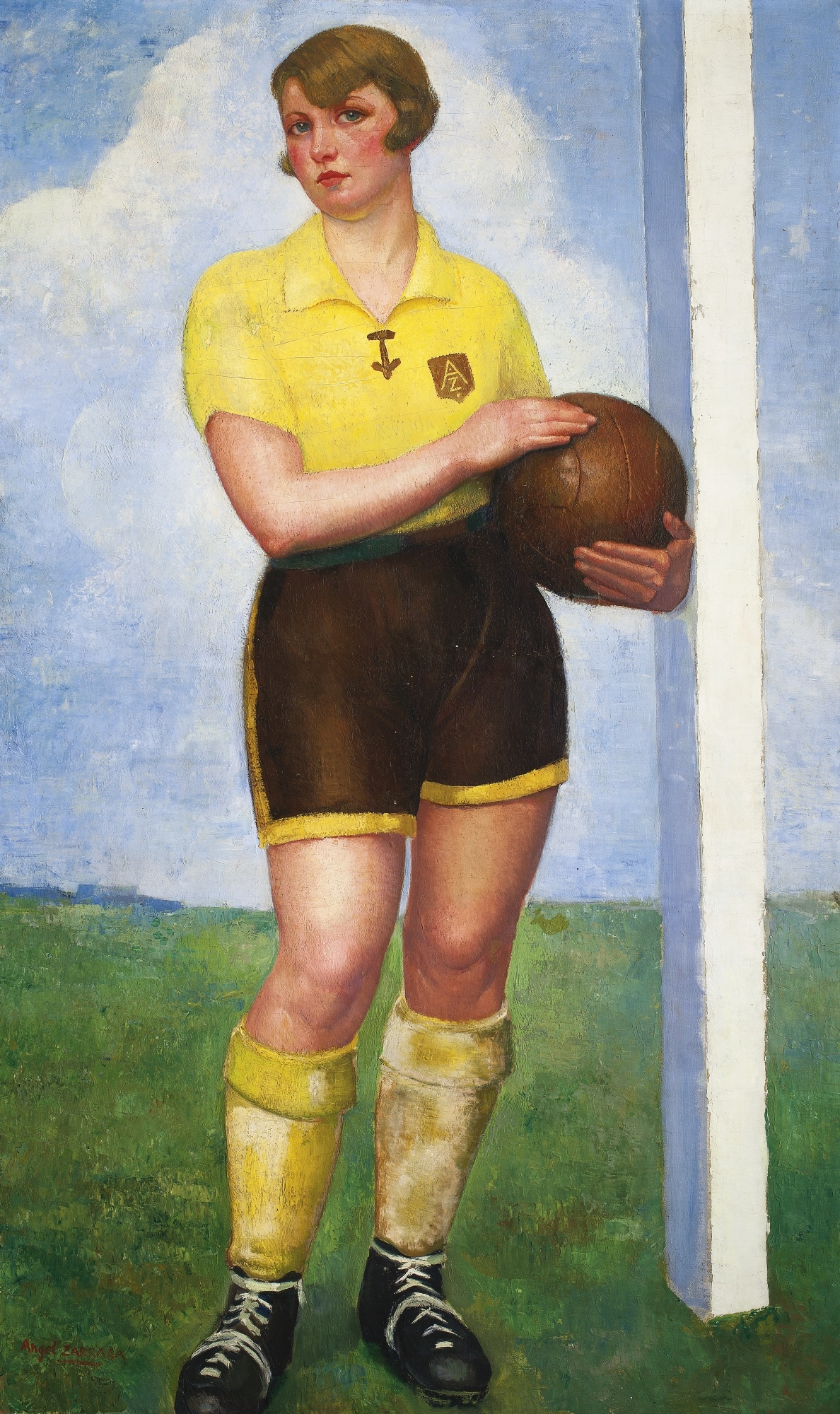
Blonde football player, 1926

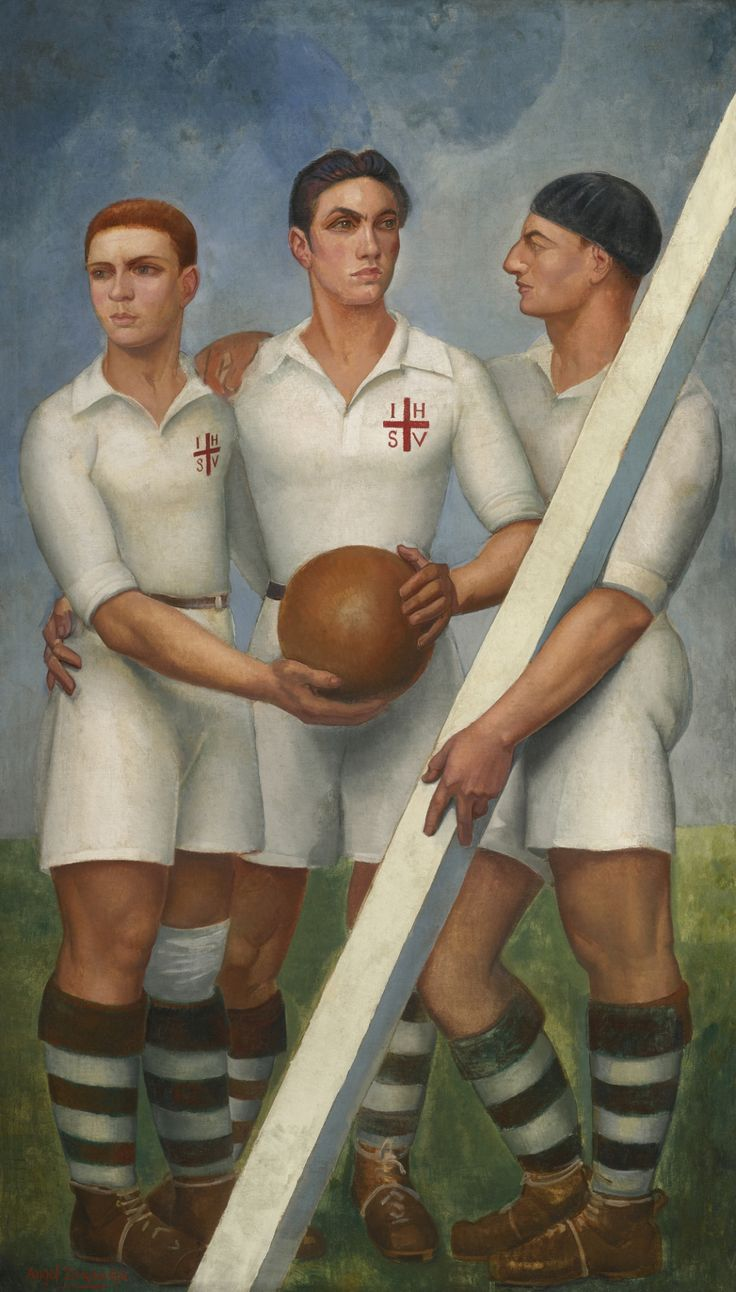
Three players with beret, 1921

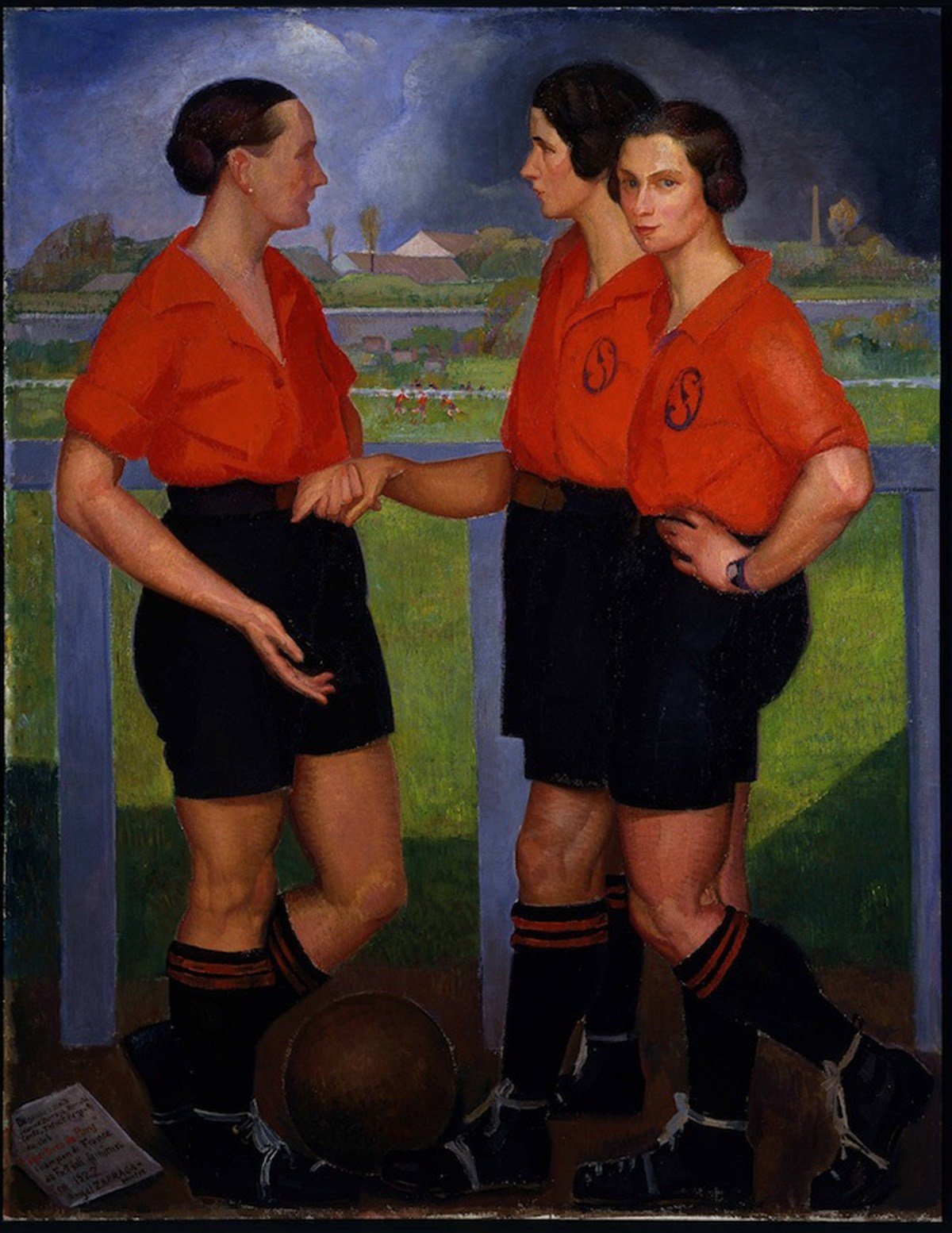
Football players, 1922

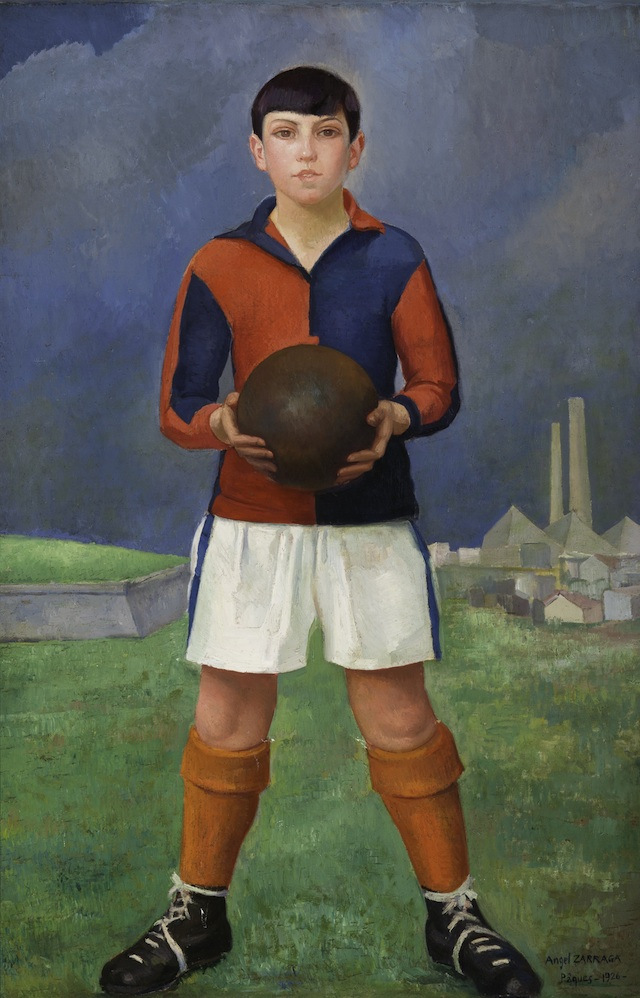
Young football player, 1926
