= José Vasconcelos =

Mexican lawyer, author, and Secretary of Education (1881–1959)

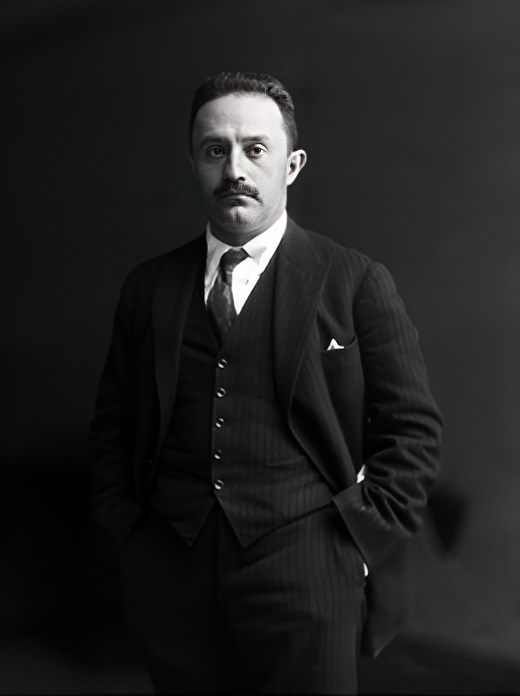
- Vasconcelos c. 1920s

1st Secretary of Public Education
- In office 28 September 1921 – 27 July 1924
- President: Álvaro Obregón
- Succeeded by: Bernardo J. Gastélum

6th Rector of the National Autonomous University of Mexico
- In office 9 June 1920 – 12 October 1921
- Preceded by: Balbino Dávalos
- Succeeded by: Mariano Silva y Aceves

Secretary of Public Instruction
- In office 6 November 1914 – 16 January 1915
- President: Eulalio Gutiérrez
- Preceded by: Rubén Valenti
- Succeeded by: Félix Fulgencio Palavicini

Personal details
- Born: José Vasconcelos Calderón; 28 February 1882 Oaxaca, Mexico
- Died: 30 June 1959 (aged 77) Mexico City, Mexico
- Resting place: Mexico City Cathedral
- Party: National Anti-Reelectionist Party
- Spouses: Serafina Miranda (m. 1906; died 1942) Esperanza Cruz (m. 1942)
- Children: José Ignacio, Carmen and Héctor
- Education: National School of Jurisprudence (LLB)
- Occupation: Writer, philosopher and politician

José Vasconcelos Calderón (28 February 1882 – 30 June 1959), called the "cultural caudillo" of the Mexican Revolution, was an important Mexican writer, philosopher, lawyer, and politician. He is one of the most influential and controversial personalities in the development of modern Mexico. His philosophy of the "cosmic race" affected all aspects of Mexican sociocultural, political, and economic policies.

== Early life ==
Vasconcelos was born in Oaxaca, Oaxaca, on February 28, 1882, the son of a customs official. José's mother, a pious Catholic, died when José was 16. The family moved to the border town of Piedras Negras, Coahuila, where he grew up attending school in Eagle Pass, Texas. He became bilingual in English and Spanish, which opened doors to the English-speaking world. The family also lived in Campeche while the northern border area was unstable. His time living on the Texas border likely contributed to fostering his idea of the Mexican "cosmic race" and rejection of Anglo culture.

At 24, he married Serafina Miranda of Tlaxiaco, Oaxaca, in 1906. Their children were José Ignacio and Carmen. He also had a long-term relationship with Elena Arizmendi Mejia and throughout his life many other shorter liaisons, including one with Berta Singerman. His troubled relationship with Antonieta Rivas Mercado led to her suicide inside Paris's Notre Dame Cathedral in 1931. When his wife of forty years died in 1942, their daughter Carmen is reported to have said, "When the coffin was lowered into the ground, Vasconcelos sobbed bitterly. At that moment he must have known and felt who he really had as a wife; perhaps they were tears of belated repentance." He remarried the pianist Esperanza Cruz and they had a child, Héctor, in 1945.

== Mexican Revolution ==
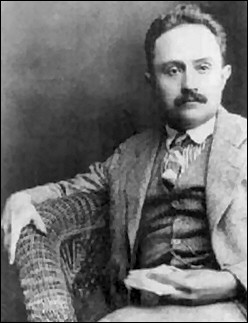
José Vasconcelos

Although Vasconcelos was interested in studying philosophy, the Porfiriato's universities focused on the sciences, influenced by French positivism. Vasconcelos attended the National Preparatory School, an elite high school in Mexico City, and he went on to Escuela de Jurisprudencia in Mexico City (1905). In law school, he became involved with a group of radical students organized as the Ateneo de la Juventud (Youth Atheneum). The Ateneo de Juventud was led by a Dominican citizen, Pedro Henríquez Ureña, who had read Uruguayan essayist José Enrique Rodó's Ariel, an influential work published in 1900 that was opposed to Anglo cultural influence but also emphasized the redemptive power of education. The Ateneo de la Juventud had a diverse membership, composed of university professors, artists, other professionals, and students. Some other members included Isidro Fabela and Diego Rivera. Opposed to the Díaz regime, it formulated arguments against it and its emphasis on positivism by employing French spiritualism, which articulated "a new vision of the relationship between individual and society."

After graduating from law school, he joined the law firm of Warner, John, and Galston in Washington, D.C. Vasconcelos joined the local Anti-Re-election Club in Washington, D.C. It supported the democratic movement to oust the longtime President of Mexico Porfirio Díaz in 1910 and was headed by Francisco I. Madero, the presidential candidate of the Anti-Re-election Party. Vasconcelos returned to Mexico City to participate more directly in the anti-re-election movement, became one of the party's secretaries, and edited its newspaper, El Antireelectionista.

After Díaz was ousted by revolutionary violence that was followed by the election of Madero to the presidency, Vasconcelos led a structural change at the National Preparatory School. He changed the academic programs and broke with the past positivistic influence.

After Madero's assassination in February 1913, Vasconcelos joined the broad movement to defeat the military regime of Victoriano Huerta. Soon, Vasconcelos was forced into exile in Paris, where he met Julio Torri, Doctor Atl, Gabriele D'Annunzio, and other contemporary intellectuals and artists. After Huerta was ousted in July 1914, Vasconcelos returned to Mexico.

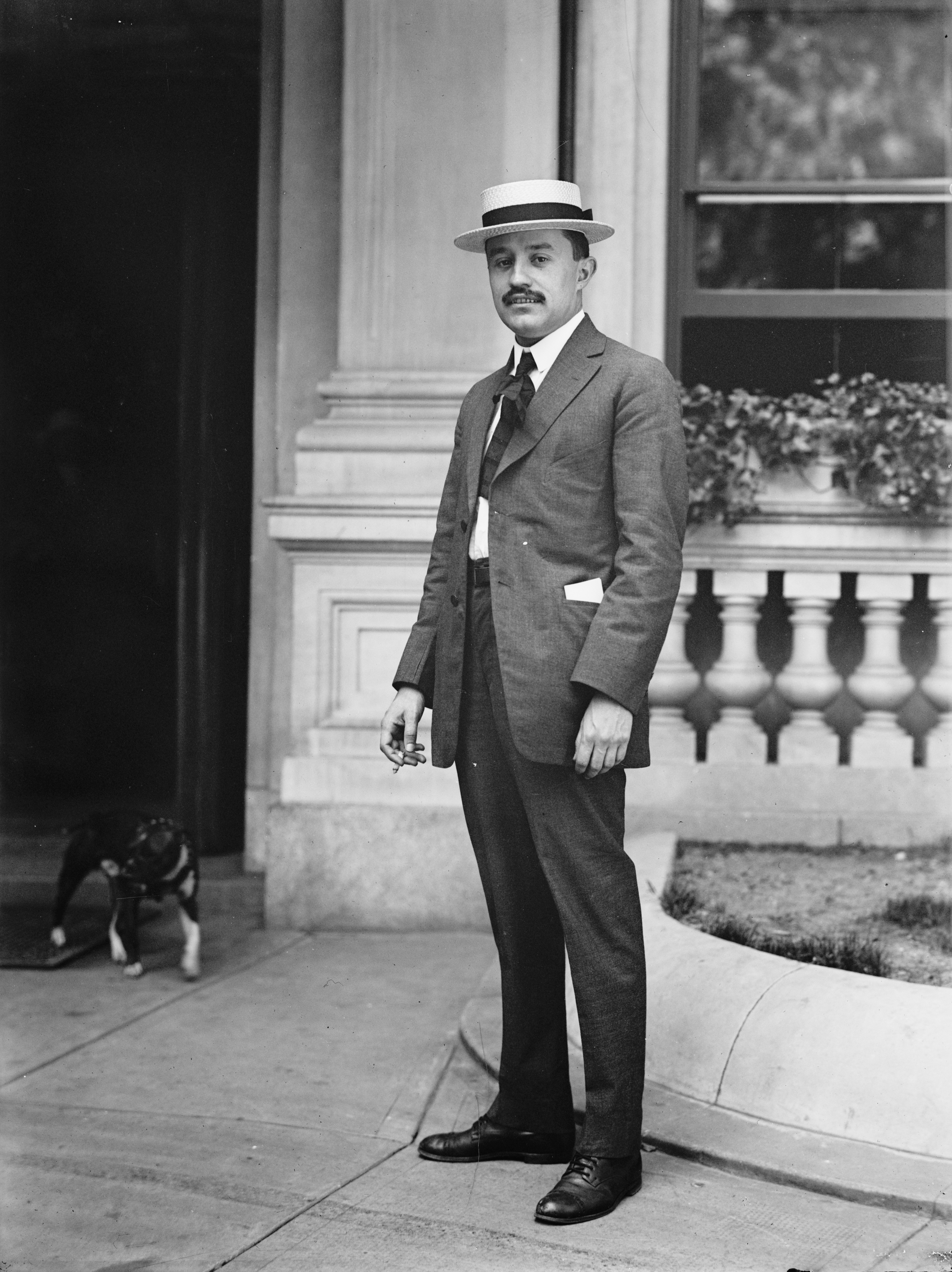
José Vasconcelos in 1914

The Convention of Aguascalientes in 1914, the failed attempt of the anti-Huerta regime to find a political solution, split the factions. The leader of the Constitutionalists, Venustiano Carranza, and General Álvaro Obregón split with more radical revolutionaries, especially Pancho Villa and Emiliano Zapata. Vasconcelos chose the side of the Convention and served as Minister of Education during the brief presidential period of Eulalio Gutiérrez. Villa was defeated by the Constitutionalist Army under Obregón in the Battle of Celaya in 1915, and Vasconcelos went into exile again. Venustiano Carranza became President (1915–1920), but was ousted and killed by the Sonoran generals who had helped put him in power.

== Rector of National University ==
Logo of the National University of Mexico that was designed by Vasconcelos as its rector

Vasconcelos returned to Mexico during the interim presidency of Sonoran Adolfo de la Huerta and was named rector of the National Autonomous University of Mexico (1920). As rector, he had a great deal of power, but he accrued even more by ignoring the standard structures, such as the University Council, to govern the institution. Rather, he exercised personal power and began implementing his vision of the function of the university. He redesigned the logo of the university to show a map of Latin America, with the phrase Por mi raza hablará el espíritu ("Through [or for] my race, the spirit shall speak"), an influence of Rodó's arielismo. It also had an eagle and a condor and a background of the volcanic mountains in central Mexico. Vasconcelos is said to have declared, "I have not come to govern the University but to ask the University to work for the people."

== Secretary of Public Education ==
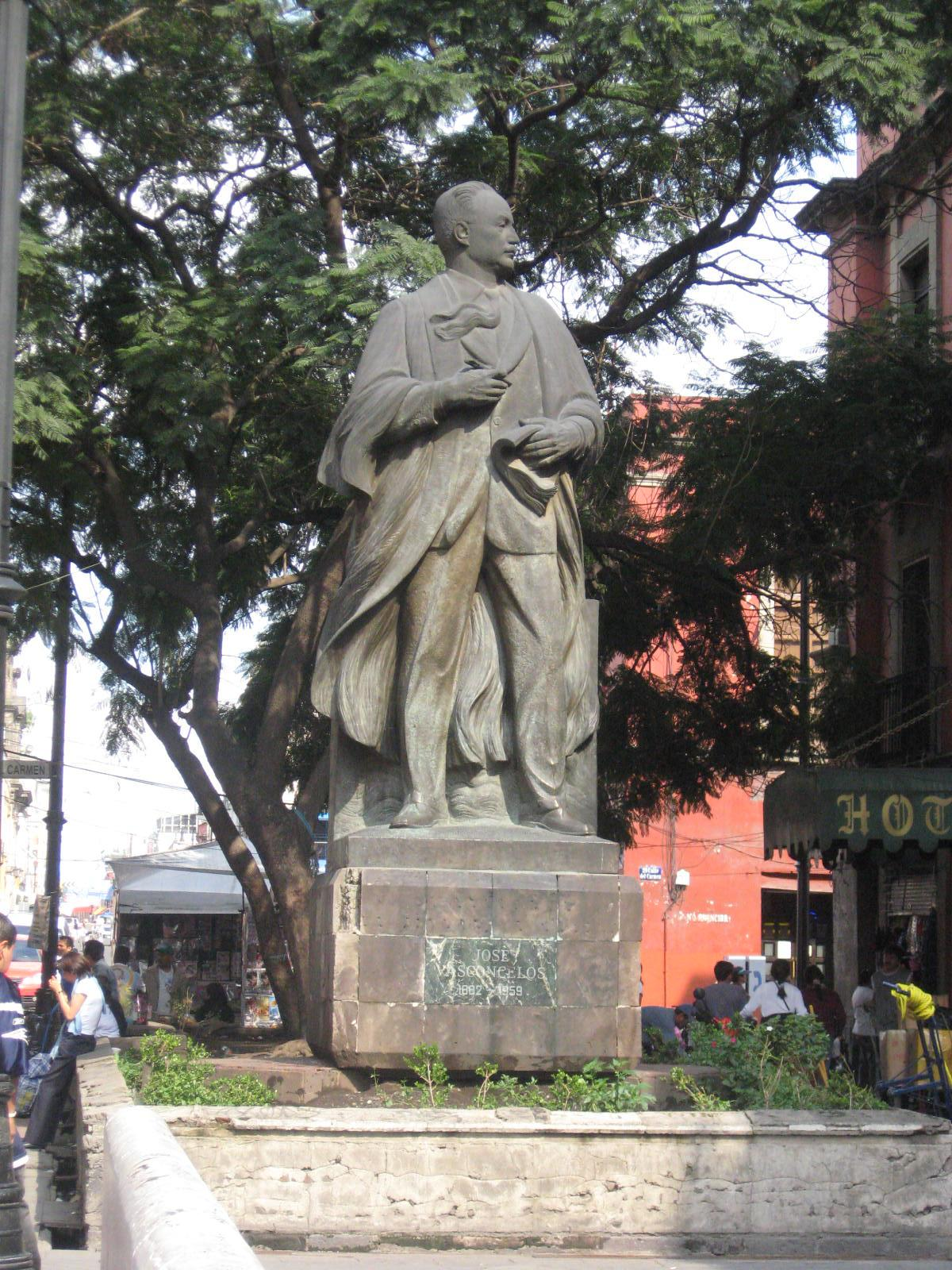
Statue of Vasconcelos in Mexico City

When Obregón became President in 1920, he created the Secretariat of Public Education (SEP) in 1921 and named Vasconcelos as its head. Under Obregón, the national budget had two key expenditures; the military was one, but the other was education. Creating the Secretariat entailed changing the Constitution of 1917, and so Obregón's government had to muster support from lawmakers. Vasconcelos traveled throughout Mexico while he was rector of the university to seek that support. His effort succeeded, and Vasconcelos was named head of the new cabinet-level secretariat in July 1921.

His tenure at the Secretariat gave him a powerful position to implement his vision of Mexico's history, especially the Mexican Revolution.

Vasconcelos printed huge numbers of texts for the expanded public school system, but in the 1920s, there was no agreement about how the Mexican Revolution should be portrayed and so earlier history texts by Justo Sierra, the head of the ministry of public education during the Díaz regime, continued to be used.

Although Vasconcelos was no advocate of Mexican Indigenous culture, as Secretary of Education he sent a statue of the last Aztec emperor, Cuauhtemoc, to Brazil for its centennial celebrations of independence in 1923, to the amazement of the South American recipients.

== Later life ==
He resigned in 1924 because of his opposition to President Plutarco Elías Calles. He worked for the education of the masses and sought to make the nation's education on secular, civic, and Pan-American (americanista) lines. He ran for the presidency in 1929 but lost to Pascual Ortiz Rubio in a controversial election, and again left the country.

He later directed the National Library of Mexico (1940) and presided over the Mexican Institute of Hispanic Culture (1948).

José Vasconcelos died on 30 June 1959 in the Tacubaya neighborhood of Mexico City. His body was found reclining on the desk, in which he was working on one of his last literary works: Letanías del atardecer ('Litanies of the evening'), published posthumously unfinished. Because of his qualities as a pedagogue and his strong support for Latin American culture, he was named "Teacher of the Youth of America" a title that is often abbreviated as "Teacher of America".

== Philosophical thought ==
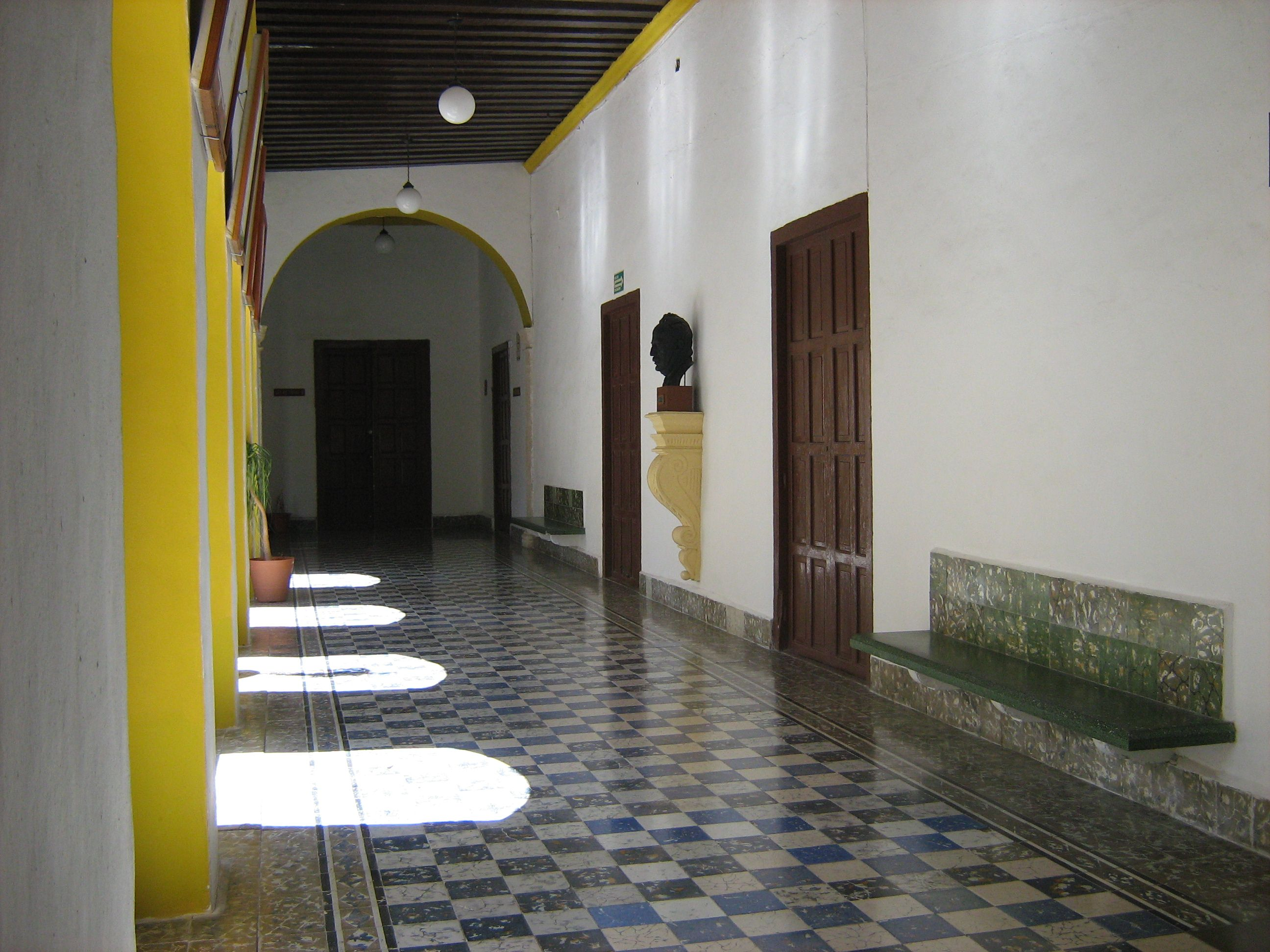
Small statue (bust) of Vasconcelos at the Instituto Campechano, San Francisco de Campeche

Vasconcelos's first writings on philosophy are passionate reactions against the formal, positivistic education at the National Preparatory School, formerly under the influence of Porfirian thinkers like Justo Sierra and Gabino Barreda.

A second period of productivity was fed by a first disappointment in the political field, after Madero's murder. In 1919, he wrote a long essay on Pythagoreanism, as a dissertation on the links between harmony and rhythm and its eventual explanation into a frame of aesthetic monism. As he argued that only by the means of rhythm can humans able to know the world without any intermediation, he proposed that the minimal aspects of cognition are conditioned by a degree of sympathy with the natural "vibration" of things. In that manner, he thought that the auditive categories of knowledge were much higher than the visual ones.

Later, Vasconcelos developed an argument for the mixing of races, as a natural and desirable direction for humankind. That work, known as La raza cósmica ('The Cosmic Race'), would eventually contribute to further studies on ethnic values as an ethic and for the consideration of ethnic variety as an aesthetic source. Finally, between 1931 and 1940, he tried to consolidate his proposals by publishing his main topics organized in three main works: Metafísica ('Metaphysics'), Ética ('Ethics'), and Estética ('Aesthetics').

In the final part of his life, he gradually fell into a deeply Catholic political conservatism. Before the Second World War, he had begun writing sympathetically about Francisco Franco, and he retracted some of his earlier liberal positions. One of his last published works, Letanías del atardecer (1957) is a pessimistic tract that hinted that the use of nuclear weapons might be necessary because of the postwar order.

== Influence ==
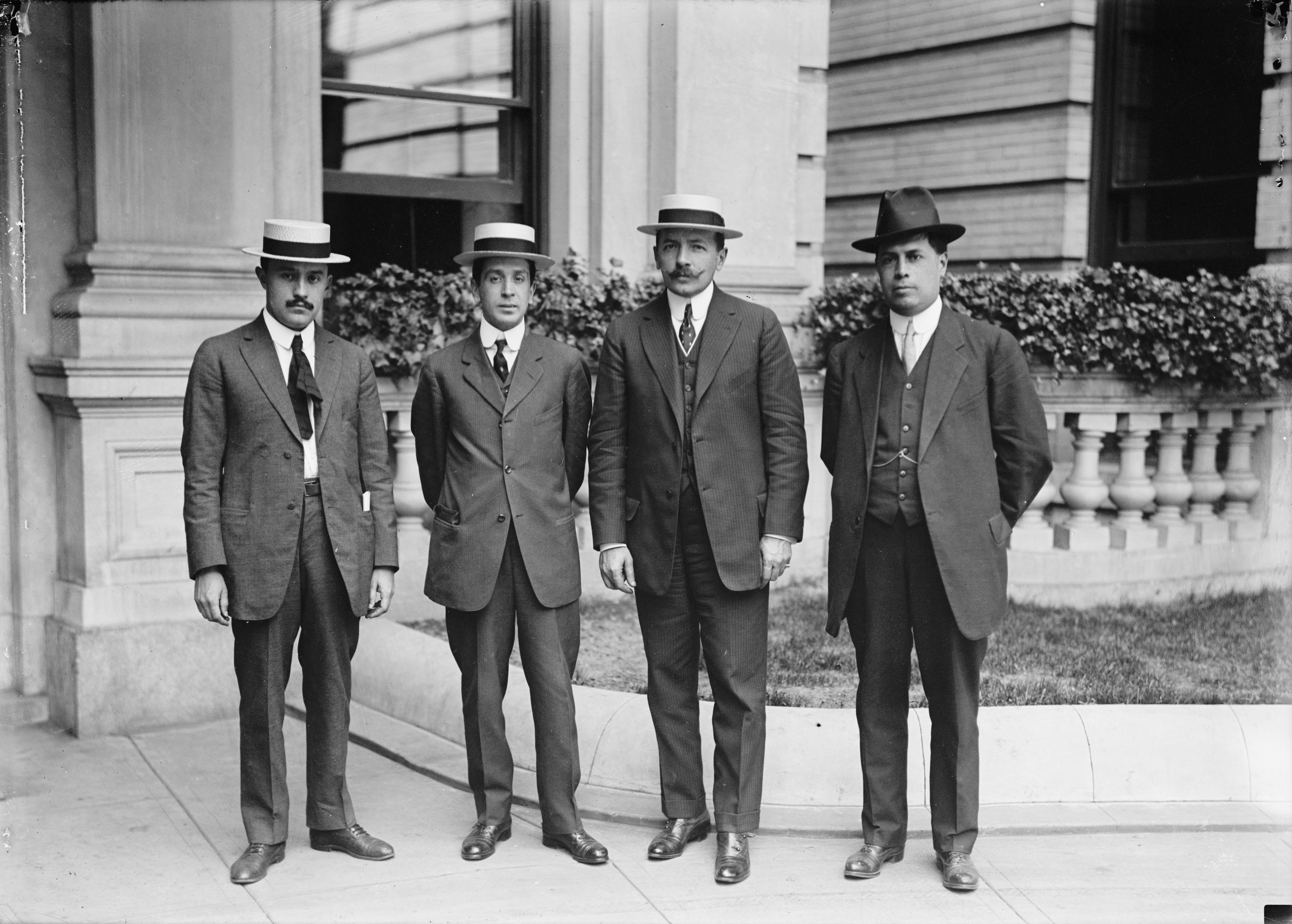
José Vasconcelos (left) with José Urquidi, Rafael Zubarán Capmany and Peredo

Vasconcelos is often referred to as the father of the indigenismo philosophy. In recent times it has come under criticism from Native Americans, because of its negative implications concerning indigenous peoples. To an extent his philosophy argued for a new, "modern" mestizo people, at the cost of cultural assimilation for all ethnic groups. His research on the nature of Mexican modern identity had a direct influence on the young writers, poets, anthropologists, and philosophers who wrote on this subject. He also influenced the point of view of Carlos Pellicer with respect to several aesthetic assumptions reflected in his books. Together, Pellicer and Vasconcelos made a trip through the Middle East (1928–1929) and were looking for the "spiritual basis" of Byzantine architecture.

Other works, particularly La raza cósmica and Metafísica, had a decisive influence in Octavio Paz's El laberinto de la soledad ('The Labyrinth of Solitude'), with anthropological and aesthetic implications. Paz wrote that Vasconcelos was "the teacher" who had educated hundreds of young Latin American intellectuals during his many trips to Central and South America. Vasconcelos was a guest lecturer at Columbia University and Princeton University, but his influence on new generations in the United States gradually decreased. Nevertheless, his work La raza cósmica has been used by Chicano and Mexican-American movements since the 1970s, which assert the reconquista ('retaking' or literally 'reconquest') of the American Southwest, based on their Mexican ancestry.

== Contributions to national culture ==
Vasconcelos caused the National Symphonic Orchestra (1920) and the Symphonic Orchestra of Mexico (1928) to be officially endorsed. Under his secretaryship, artists Diego Rivera, José Clemente Orozco, and David Alfaro Siqueiros were permitted to paint the inner walls of the most important public buildings in Mexico (such as the National Palace in Mexico City), creating the Mexican muralist movement.

== Quotations ==
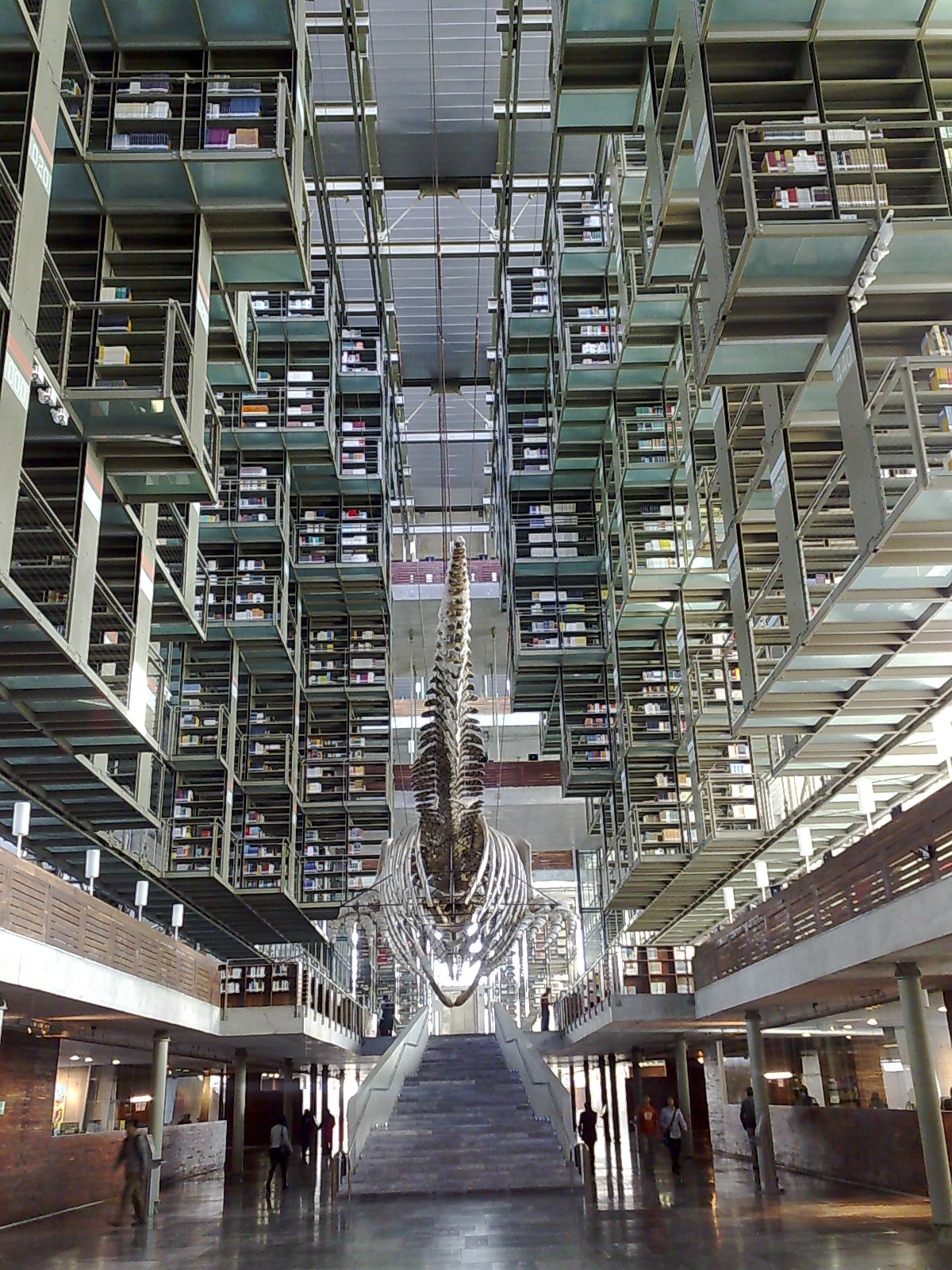
Inside the Biblioteca Vasconcelos (Vasconcelos Library), Mexico City

"[T]he leaders of Latin American independence ... strove to free the slaves, declared the equality of all men by natural law; the social and civic equality of whites, blacks and Indians. In an instant of historical crisis, they formulated the transcendental mission assigned to that region of the Globe: the mission of fusing the peoples ethnically and spiritually." (La raza cósmica, 1948)

"Each of the great nations of History has believed itself to be the final and chosen one. ... The Hebrews founded the belief in their superiority on oracles and divine promises. The English found theirs on observations relative to domestic animals. From the observation of cross-breeding and hereditary varieties in such animals, Darwinism emerged. First, as a modest zoological theory, then as social biology that confers definitive preponderance to the English above all races. Every imperialism needs a justifying philosophy". (La raza cósmica, 1948)

"Hitler, although he disposes of absolute power, finds himself a thousand leagues from Caesarism. Power does not come to Hitler from the military base, but from the book that inspires the troops from the top. Hitler's power is not owed to the troops, nor the battalions, but to his own discussions... Hitler represents, ultimately, an idea, the German idea, so often humiliated previously by French militarism and English perfidy. Truthfully, we find civilian governed 'democracies' fighting against Hitler. But they are democracies in name only". ("La Inteligencia se impone", Timon 16; June 8, 1940)

== Publications ==
Vasconcelos was a prolific author, writing in a variety of genres, especially philosophy, but also autobiography.

=== Theoretical Philosophy ===
- Teoría dinámica del derecho (Dynamic Theory of Right), 1907
- Don Gabino Barreda y las ideas contemporáneas (Don Gabino Barreda and Contemporary ideas), 1910
- Pitágoras. Una teoría del ritmo (Pythagoras: A Theory of Rhythm), 1916
- El monismo estético ('Aesthetic Monism'), 1918
- Estudios indostánicos ('Hindustanti Studies'), 1921
- La revulsión de la energía. Los ciclos de la fuerza, el cambio y la existencia (The Revulsion of Energy: The Cycles of Force, Change, and Existence), 1924
- Tratado de metafísica (Treatise on Metaphysics), 1929
- Ética (Ethics), 1932
- Estética ('Aesthetics'), 1935
- Historia del pensamiento filosófico (History of Philosophical Thought), 1937
- Manual de filosofía (Handbook of Philosophy), 1940
- El realismo científico (Scientific Realism), 1943
- Lógica orgánica ('Organic Logic'), 1945
- Todología (All-ology), 1952

=== Philosophy about the Americas ===
- La intelectualidad mexicana (The Mexican Intelligentsia), 1916
- Nueva ley de los tres estados (The New Law of Three Stages), 1921
- Orientaciones del pensamiento en Méjico (sic) (Orientations of Throught in Mexico), 1922
- Los pueblos iberoamericanos (carta a la juventud de Colombia) (The Ibero-American Peoples (Letter to the Youth of Colombia)), 1923
- Ideario de acción (Plan for Action), 1924
- La raza cósmica ('The Cosmic Race'), 1925
- Indología (Indology), 1926
- Aspects of Mexican Civilization (with Manuel Gamio), 1926
- De Robinson a Odiseo. Pedagogía estructurativa (From Robinson to Odysseus: Structuring Pedagogy), 1935
- Bolivarismo y monroísmo (Bolivarism and Monroeism), 1935
- Breve historia de México ('A Brief History of Mexico'), 1937
- Hernán Cortés, creador de la nacionalidad (Hernán Cortés, Creator of the Nation), 1940

=== Political Works and Speeches ===
- ¿Qué es la revolución? (What is revolution?), 1937
- Las Cartas Políticas de José Vasconcelos ('The Political Letters of José Vasconcelos'), 1959
- Discursos 1920-1950 (Discourses: 1920-1950), 1959

=== Literary and autobiographical works ===
- Prometeo Vencedor (Victorious Prometheus), c. 1919-20
- Divagaciones literarias (Literary Digressions), 1919
- Pesimismo alegre ('Cheerful Pessimism'), 1931
- Ulises criollo ('Creole Ulysses'), 1935
- La tormenta ('The Storm'), 1936
- El desastre ('The Disaster'), 1938
- El proconsulado ('The Proconsulated'), 1939
- La cita (The Rendezvous), 1945
- El viento de Behdad (The Wind of Baghdad), 1945
- En el ocaso de mi vida (In the Twilight of My Life), 1957
- La Flama. Los de Arriba en la Revolución. Historia y Tragedia ('The Flame. Those of Above in the Revolution. History and Tragedy'), 1959
- Letanías del atardecer (Litanies of Sunset), 1959
- Obras completas ('Complete Works'), 1957–1961

== See also ==
- José Vasconcelos Library
- José Vasconcelos World Award of Education
- Moisés Sáenz
