= Secretariat of Foreign Affairs (Mexico) =

Performs the diplomatic relations of the United Mexican States with other countries

Secretariat of Foreign Affairs of Mexico
- Secretaría de Relaciones Exteriores
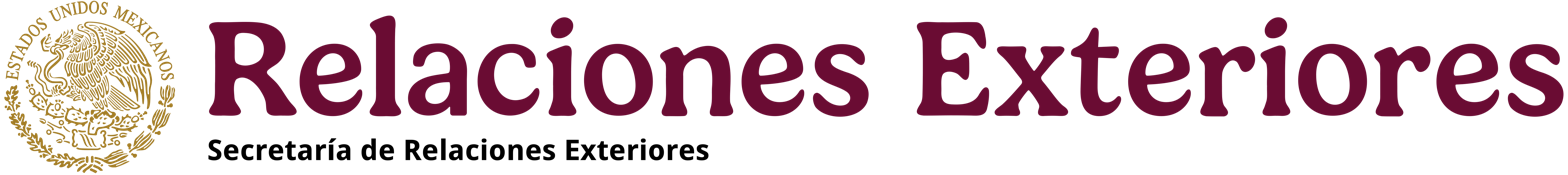

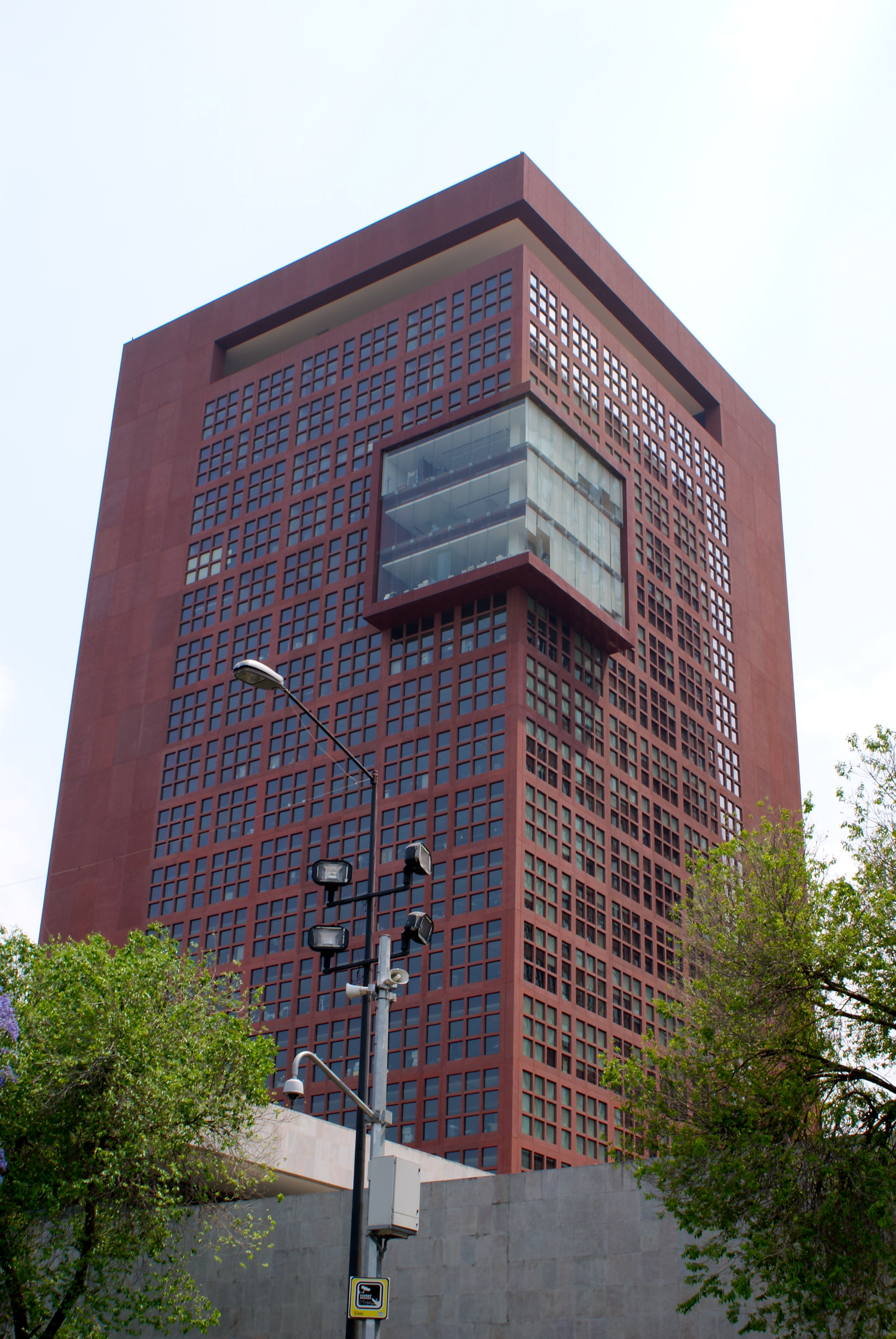
- Headquarters of the SRE in Mexico City

Agency overview
- Formed: 1821; 205 years ago
- Jurisdiction: Federal Government of Mexico
- Headquarters: Ave. Juárez #20, Col. Centro, CP 06010, Del. Cuauhtémoc, Mexico City; 19°26′01″N 99°08′39″W
- Employees: 11,500
- Annual budget: $27.4 billion (FY 2010)
- Minister responsible: Roberto Velasco Álvarez, Secretary of Foreign Affairs
- Child agency: Mexican Consulates and Embassies
- Website: http://www.sre.gob.mx

Footnotes
- flag

The Secretariat of Foreign Affairs (Spanish: Secretaría de Relaciones Exteriores, SRE, lit: Secretariat of External Relations) is the government department responsible for Mexico's foreign affairs.

Mexico currently has 80 embassies, 33 consulates-general, 35 consulates, 1 representative office in Ramallah, 1 trade office in Taiwan and 144 honorary consulates around the world. Mexico also has 2 permanent representations to the United Nations in New York City and Geneva, there are also permanent missions to the OAS in Washington, D.C., to UNESCO in Paris, to European Union in Brussels, to OECD in Paris, to ICAO in Montreal and to OPANAL in Mexico City. Mexico also has permanent observer mission status to the AU, CAN, CE, Mercosur, NAM and Unasur. The Secretariat also operates passport offices throughout Mexico where Mexican citizens can apply in person for passports for international travel.

The person in charge of the Secretariat of Foreign Affairs is the Secretary of Foreign Affairs, also known domestically as the canciller (Spanish, lit. chancellor).

The Secretary's subordinate officials and agencies include the Undersecretary for Foreign Relations, the Undersecretary for Latin America and the Caribbean, the Undersecretary for North America, the Undersecretary for Multilateral Affairs and Human Rights, the Mexican Agency for International Development Cooperation (AMEXCID) and the Legal Counselor.

== Functions ==
- To direct the foreign service in its daily aspects in the diplomatic and consular tasks under the terms of the Law of the Mexican Foreign Service and, through the agents of the same service, to watch abroad for the good name of Mexico; Impart protection to Mexicans; Collect consular fees and other taxes; To exercise notarial functions, of Civil Registry, of judicial assistance and the other federal functions that the laws indicate, and acquire, manage and conserve the properties of the Nation abroad
- To assist the commercial and tourist promotion of the country through its embassies and consulates
- Train members of the Mexican Foreign Service in the commercial and tourist areas, so that they can fulfill the responsibilities derived from the provisions of the previous section.
- To intervene in international commissions, congresses, conferences and exhibitions, and to participate in international organizations and institutes of which the Mexican government is a part
- Intervene in matters related to the territorial limits of the country and international waters
- To grant to the foreigners the licenses and authorizations that they require according to the laws to acquire the dominion of the lands, waters and their accessions in the Mexican Republic; Obtain concessions and enter into contracts, intervene in the exploitation of natural resources or to invest or participate in Mexican civil or mercantile societies, as well as to grant permits for the constitution of these or to amend its bylaws or to acquire real property or rights over them
- Keeping track of the operations performed according to the previous fraction
- Intervene on all issues related to nationality and naturalization
- Save and use the Great Seal of the Nation
- Collect autographs of all kinds of diplomatic documents
- Legalize the signatures of documents that must produce effects abroad and foreign documents that must produce them in the Republic
- To intervene, through the Attorney General of the Republic, in the extradition in accordance with the law or treaties, and in the international letters or letters rogatory to get them to their destination, after examining that they fulfill the formal requirements for their diligence and Its origin or unlawfulness, to make it known to the competent judicial authorities
- The others that expressly attribute the laws and regulations

== List of secretaries ==
- President Antonio López de Santa Anna
  - (1853–1853) : Lucas Alamán
  - (1853–1853) : José Miguel Arroyo
  - (1853–1855) : Manuel Diez de Bonilla
- President Martín Carrera
  - (1855–1855) : José Miguel Arroyo
- President Rómulo Díaz de la Vega
  - (1855–1855) : José Miguel Arroyo
- President Juan Nepomuceno Álvarez
  - (1855–1855) : Melchor Ocampo
  - (1855–1855) : Miguel María Arrioja
- President Ignacio Comonfort
  - (1855–1855) : Lucas de Palacio y Magarola
  - (1855–1856) : Luis de la Rosa
  - (1856–1856) : Juan Antonio de la Fuente
  - (1856–1856) : Miguel Lerdo de Tejada
  - (1856–1857) : Lucas de Palacio y Magarola
  - (1857–1857) : Ezequiel Montes
  - (1857–1857) : Lucas de Palacio y Magarola
  - (1857–1857) : Juan Antonio de la Fuente
  - (1857–1857) : Sebastián Lerdo de Tejada
  - (1857–1857) : Lucas de Palacio y Magarola
  - (1857–1857) : Juan Antonio de la Fuente
  - (1857–1858) : Lucas de Palacio y Magarola
- President Félix María Zuloaga
  - (1858–1858) : Luis G. Cuevas
  - (1858–1858) : Joaquín María del Castillo
  - (1859–1859) : Joaquín María del Castillo
- President Manuel Robles Pezuela
  - (1858–1859) : Joaquín María del Castillo
- President José Mariano Salas
  - (1859–1859) : Joaquín María del Castillo
- President Miguel Miramón
  - (1859–1859) : Joaquín María del Castillo
  - (1859–1859) : José Miguel Arroyo
  - (1859–1859) : Manuel Diez de Bonilla
  - (1859–1860) : Octaviano Muñoz Ledo
  - (1860–1860) : José Miguel Arroyo
  - (1860–1860) : Teodosio Lares
- President José Ignacio Pavón
  - (1860–1860) : José Miguel Arroyo
- Emperor Maximilian I
  - (1863–1864) : José Miguel Arroyo
  - (1864–1865) : José Fernando Ramírez
  - (1865–1866) : Martín de Castillo
  - (1866–1866) : Luis de Arroyo
  - (1866–1867) : Juan N. de Pereda
  - (1867–1867) : Tomás Murphy
- President Benito Juárez
  - (1858–1859) : Melchor Ocampo
  - (1859–1859) : Juan Antonio de la Fuente
  - (1859–1860) : Melchor Ocampo
  - (1860–1860) : Santos Degollado
  - (1860–1860) : José de Emparán
  - (1860–1861) : Melchor Ocampo
  - (1861–1861) : Juan de Dios Arias
  - (1861–1861) : Francisco Zarco
  - (1861–1861) : Lucas de Palacio y Magarola
  - (1861–1861) : León Guzmán
  - (1861–1861) : Lucas de Palacio y Magarola
  - (1861–1861) : Manuel María de Zamacona
  - (1861–1861) : Juan de Dios Arias
  - (1861–1862) : Manuel Doblado
  - (1862–1862) : Jesús Terán
  - (1862–1862) : Manuel Doblado
  - (1862–1862) : Juan de Dios Arias
  - (1862–1863) : Juan Antonio de la Fuente
  - (1863–1863) : Manuel Doblado
  - (1863–1868) : Sebastián Lerdo de Tejada
  - (1868–1868) : Manuel de Aspiroz
  - (1868–1871) : Sebastián Lerdo de Tejada
  - (1871–1871) : Manuel de Aspiroz
  - (1871–1872) : Ignacio Mariscal
  - (1872–1872) : José María Lafragua
- President Sebastián Lerdo de Tejada
  - (1872–1875) : José María Lafragua
  - (1875–1876) : Juan de Dios Arias
  - (1876–1876) : Manuel Romero Rubio
- President Porfirio Díaz
  - (1877–1878) : Ignacio Luis Vallarta
  - (1878–1878) : José María Malta
  - (1878–1879) : Eleuterio Ávila
  - (1879–1880) : Miguel Ruelas
  - (1884–1885) : José Fernández
  - (1885–1910) : Ignacio Mariscal
  - (1910–1910) : Federico Gamboa
  - (1911–1911) : Enrique C. Creel
  - (1911–1911) : Victoriano Salado Álvarez
  - (1911–1911) : Francisco León de la Barra
- President Juan Nepomuceno Méndez
  - (1876–1877) : Ignacio Luis Vallarta
- President Manuel González
  - (1880–1883) : Ignacio Mariscal
  - (1884–1884) : José Fernández
- President Francisco León de la Barra
  - (1911–1911) : Bartolomé Carvajal y Rosas
- President Francisco I. Madero
  - (1911–1912) : Manuel Calero
  - (1912–1913) : Pedro Lascuráin
- President Pedro Lascuráin
  - (1913-1913) : Pedro Lascuráin
- President Victoriano Huerta
  - (1913–1913) : Francisco León de la Barra
  - (1913–1913) : Carlos Pereyra
  - (1913–1913) : Manuel Garza Aldape
  - (1913–1913) : Federico Gamboa
  - (1913–1913) : Antonio de la Peña y Reyes
  - (1913–1914) : Querido Moheno
  - (1914–1914) : José López Portillo y Rojas
  - (1914–1914) : Roberto Esteva Ruiz
  - (1914–1914) : Francisco S. Carvajal
- President Francisco S. Carvajal
  - (1914–1914) : Rafael Díaz Iturbide
- President Venustiano Carranza
  - (1914–1914) : Isidro Fabela
  - (1914–1915) : Jesús Urueta y Siqueiros
  - (1915–1916) : Jesús Mario Acuña Fadul
  - (1916–1917) : Cándido Aguilar
  - (1917–1917) : Ernesto Garza Pérez
- President Adolfo de la Huerta
  - (1920–1920) : Miguel Covarrubias Acosta
  - (1920–1920) : Cutberto Hidalgo Téllez
- President Álvaro Obregón
  - (1920–1921) : Cutberto Hidalgo Téllez
  - (1921–1923) : Alberto J. Pani
  - (1923–1924) : Aarón Sáenz Garza
- President Plutarco Elías Calles
  - (1924–1927) : Aarón Sáenz Garza
  - (1927–1928) : Genaro Estrada
- President Emilio Portes Gil
  - (1928–1930) : Genaro Estrada
- President Pascual Ortiz Rubio
  - (1930–1932) : Genaro Estrada
  - (1932–1932) : Manuel C. Téllez
- President Abelardo L. Rodríguez
  - (1932–1934) : Manuel C. Téllez
- President Lázaro Cárdenas del Río
  - (1934–1935) : Emilio Portes Gil
  - (1935–1935) : José Ángel Ceniceros
  - (1935–1940) : Eduardo Hay
- President Manuel Ávila Camacho
  - (1940–1945) : Ezequiel Padilla
  - (1945–1946) : Francisco Castillo Nájera
- President Miguel Alemán
  - (1946–1948) : Jaime Torres Bodet
  - (1948–1952) : Manuel Tello Baurraud
- President Adolfo Ruiz Cortines
  - (1952–1958) : Luis Padilla Nervo
- President Adolfo López Mateos
  - (1958–1964) : Manuel Tello Baurraud
- President Gustavo Díaz Ordaz
  - (1964–1970) : Antonio Carrillo Flores
- President Luis Echeverría
  - (1970–1975) : Emilio O. Rabasa
  - (1975–1976) : Alfonso García Robles
- President José López Portillo
  - (1976–1979) : Santiago Roel García
  - (1979–1982) : Jorge Castañeda y Álvarez de la Rosa
- President Miguel de la Madrid
  - (1982–1988) : Bernardo Sepúlveda Amor
- President Carlos Salinas de Gortari
  - (1988–1993) : Fernando Solana
  - (1993–1994) : Manuel Camacho Solís
  - (1994–1994) : Manuel Tello Macías
- President Ernesto Zedillo
  - (1994–1998) : José Ángel Gurría
  - (1998–2000) : Rosario Green
- President Vicente Fox
  - (2000–2003) : Jorge Castañeda Gutman
  - (2003–2006) : Luis Ernesto Derbez
- President Felipe Calderón
  - (2006–2012) : Patricia Espinosa
- President Enrique Peña Nieto
  - (2012–2015) : José Antonio Meade
  - (2015–2016) : Claudia Ruiz Massieu
  - (2017–2018) : Luis Videgaray Caso
- President Andrés Manuel López Obrador
  - (2018–2023) : Marcelo Ebrard
  - (2023–2024) : Alicia Bárcena
- President Claudia Sheinbaum
  - (2024–2026) : Juan Ramón de la Fuente
  - (2026-present) : Roberto Velasco Álvarez
