= Secretariat of the Interior =

Executive department of the Mexican government

- Secretaría de Gobernación
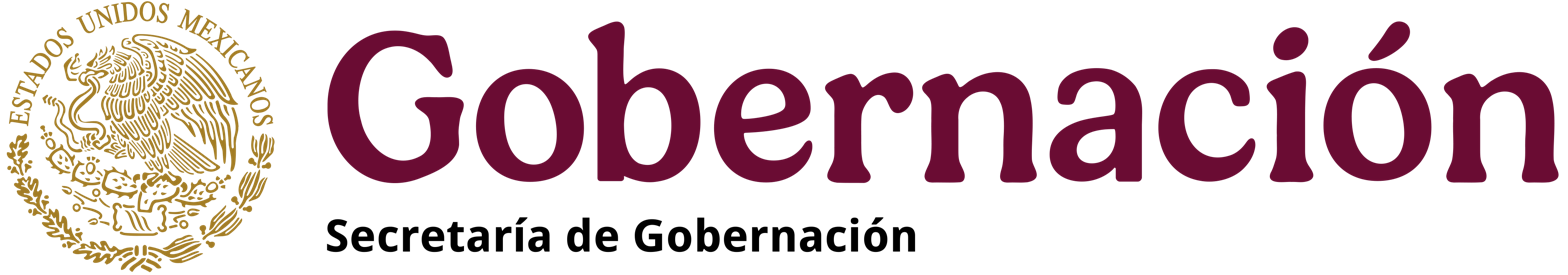
- Logo of the Secretariat of the Interior

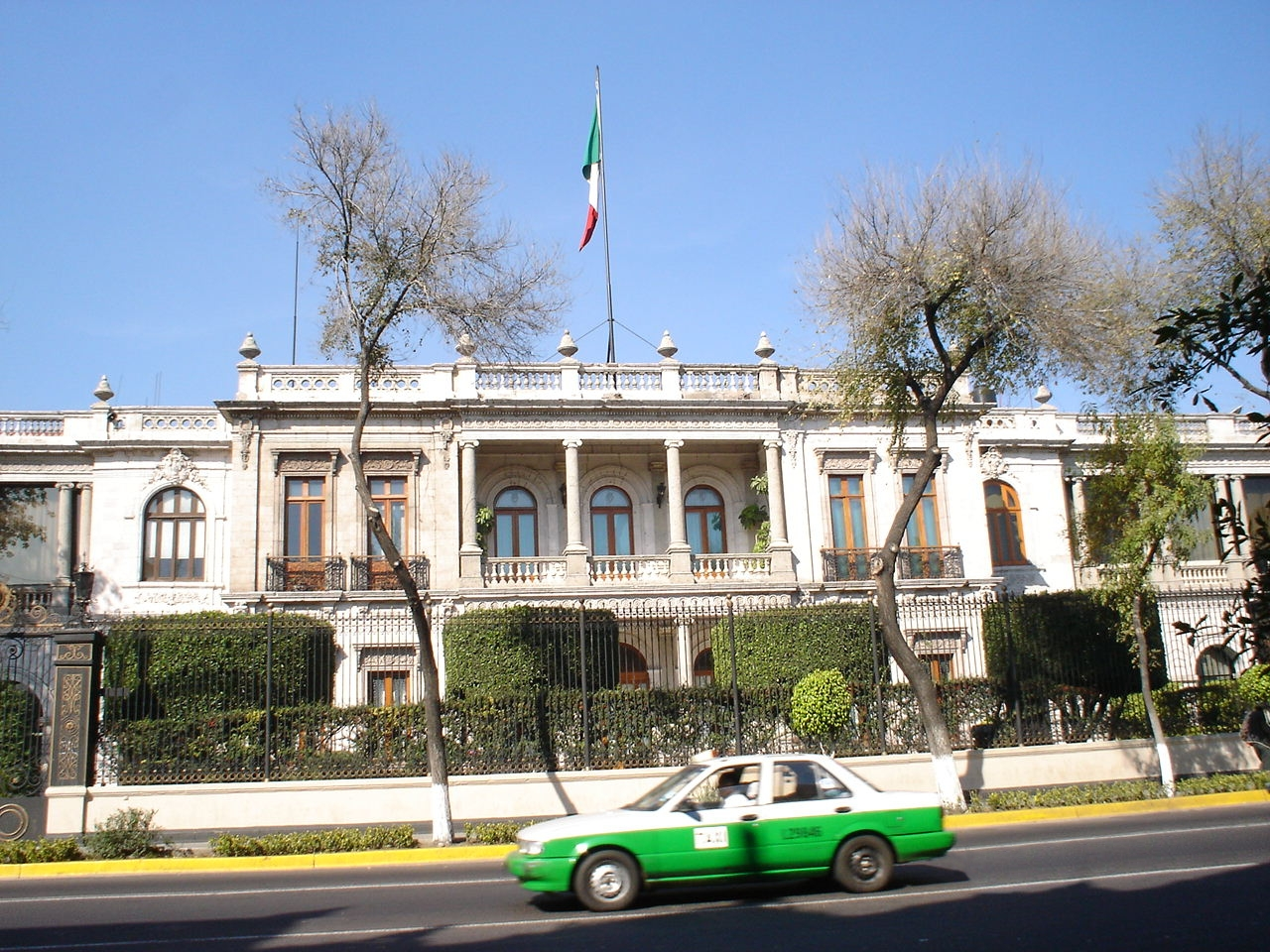
- Head Office of the Interior

Agency overview
- Formed: 1853
- Preceding agency: Office for Domestic and Foreign Affairs
- Jurisdiction: Federal government of Mexico
- Headquarters: Abraham González 49 Juárez 06600 Juárez, Mexico City; 19°25′52″N 99°09′11″W
- Agency executive: Rosa Icela Rodríguez, Secretary
- Child agencies: Federal Police (Mexico); General Directorate of Radio, Television and Film; Center for Research and National Security; National Institute of Migration
- Key document: Reglamento Interior
- Website: www.segob.gob.mx

The Secretariat of the Interior (Spanish: Secretaría de Gobernación, lit. 'Secretariat of Governance'; SEGOB) is the executive department of the Mexican government concerned with the country's domestic affairs, the presenting of the president's bills to Congress, their publication in the Official Journal of the Federation, and certain issues of national security. The country's principal intelligence agency, CNI, is directly answerable to the Secretary of the Interior. The Secretary is a member of the president's Cabinet and is, given the constitutional implications of the post, the most important cabinet member. Additionally, in case of both temporary and absolute absences of the president, the Secretary of the Interior assumes the president's executive powers provisionally. The Office is practically equivalent to Ministries of the Interior in most other countries (with the exception of the United States) and is occasionally translated to English as Ministry, Secretariat or Department of the Interior.

== History ==
In 1821, after the establishment of what was then the Provisional Cabinet (Junta Gubernativa Provisional), and given public urgings to organise the country's government, regulation was produced outlining the functions of a new governmental arm, then styled the "Office for Domestic and Foreign Affairs". The new agency was answerable for managing the functioning of the government in general. The first person to take up the Directorship of the Office was José Manuel de Herrera who held the post between 1821 and 1823. Later on, it became necessary to particularise the duties of certain government agencies, which, in 1843, lead to the creation of the 'Office for Home Affairs' (also styled 'Department of the Interior'), which would later be re-styled as the 'Office for Foreign Relations and Government' in 1841 and then again in 1843 as the 'Office for Home Affairs and Policing'. The Office eventually had some of its powers separated into other ministries and, in 1853, was once again named 'Office for Home Affairs' —as it is still called up to the present day.

The Secretariat of the Interior in its modern day form is concerned principally with the good management and proper application of the policies of the Federal Government within its national borders.

It is a department of the national executive branch, whose origins date back to article 222 of the 1812 Spanish Constitution, which received royal assent on 19 March 1812. Among the Cabinet Secretaries mentioned in the constitution were those of "Governance of the Realm in the Peninsula and Adjacent Islands" and "Governance of the Realm Overseas". On 22 October 1814, the "Constitutional Declaration for the Emancipation of Mexican America", known as the Constitution of Apatzingán, made provisions for a republican form of government by way of Article 134. The Apatzingán Constitution provided for an Executive Branch known as the Supreme Government which would be equipped with an Department for Home Affairs, among other governmental departments.

== Political significance ==
This position was historically seen as being a heartbeat away from the presidency, because several Secretaries of the Interior were chosen as presidential candidates for the following term by incumbent presidents Plutarco Elías Calles, Emilio Portes Gil, Lázaro Cárdenas, Miguel Alemán Valdés, Adolfo Ruiz Cortines, Gustavo Díaz Ordaz, Luis Echeverría. Francisco Labastida, Secretary of the Interior during the latter part of the Zedillo government, was seen as Zedillo's personal favorite during the Institutional Revolutionary Party's primaries (the first the party would ever hold) and during his unsuccessful bid which saw his political undoing at the hands of PAN candidate Vicente Fox. In turn, Fox's Secretary of the Interior, Santiago Creel, ran in the National Action Party's primaries in 2006, but was defeated by Felipe Calderón.

== Functions ==
According to Article 27 of the Organic Law of the Federal Public Administration the department is responsible for the following functions and duties:

- To present before the Congress of the Union the initiatives of law or decree of the Executive
- To publish the laws and decrees of the Congress of the Union, one of the two Chambers or the Standing Commission and the regulations issued by the President of the Republic, as well as the resolutions and provisions that by law must be published in the Official Journal of the Federation
- Manage and publish the Official Journal of the Federation
- Managing the National Personal Identification Service
- To deal with the administrative procedure for the expulsion of foreigners from the national territory
- To administer the islands of federal jurisdiction, except those whose administration corresponds, by provision of the law, to another dependence or entity of the federal public administration
- Conduct the internal policy that is the responsibility of the Executive and not explicitly attributed to another dependency
- To monitor the compliance of constitutional precepts by the authorities of the country, especially with regard to individual guarantees and to issue the necessary administrative measures for that purpose
- Conduct, as long as this power is not conferred on another Secretariat, the relations of the Executive Power with the other Powers of the Union, with the autonomous constitutional organs, with the governments of the federative entities, the municipalities and with the other federal and local authorities, As well as render the official information of the Federal Executive
- To conduct, within the scope of its competence, the political relations of the Executive Power with national political parties and groups, with social organizations, with religious associations and other social institutions
- Foster political development, contribute to the strengthening of democratic institutions; Promote active citizen participation and favor conditions that allow the construction of political agreements and social consensus so that, in terms of the Constitution and laws, the conditions of democratic governance
- Monitor compliance with constitutional and legal provisions in matters of public worship, churches, religious groups and associations
- To administer the General Archive of the Nation, as well as to monitor the fulfillment of the legal dispositions in matter of information of public interest
- To monitor, through the General Directorate of Radio, Television and Cinematography, that printed publications and radio and television transmissions, as well as cinematographic films, remain within the limits of respect for privacy, peace and Public morality and personal dignity, and do not attack the rights of third parties, nor cause the commission of any crime or disturb public order
- To regulate, authorize and supervise the game, the bets, the lotteries and raffles, in the terms of the relative laws
- Conduct and implement, in coordination with the authorities of the state governments, of Mexico City, with the municipal governments, and with the dependencies and entities of the Federal Public Administration, the policies and programs of civil protection of the Executive, Within the framework of the National System of Civil Protection, for the prevention, assistance, recovery and support of the population in disaster situations and to agree with institutions and organizations of the private and social sectors, actions leading to the same objective
- Establish and operate a research and information system, which contributes to preserving the integrity, stability and permanence of the Mexican State
- To contribute in what corresponds to the Executive of the Union, to give sustenance to the national unity, to preserve the social cohesion and to strengthen the institutions of government
- Compile and systematize the laws, international treaties, regulations, decrees, agreements and federal, state and municipal regulations, as well as establish the corresponding database, in order to provide information through electronic data systems

== List of secretaries ==
- President Antonio López de Santa Anna (Note: 11th Administration)

1853–1853: Manuel Díez de Bonilla
1853–1855: Ignacio Aguilar

- President Martín Carrera

1855: José Guadalupe Martínez

- President Rómulo Díaz de la Vega (Note: 12th Administration)

1855: José Guadalupe Martínez

- President Juan Nepomuceno Álvarez

1855: José Guadalupe Martínez
1855: Francisco de P. Cendejas

- President Ignacio Comonfort

1855: Francisco de P. Cendejas
1855–1857: José María Lafragua
1857: Ignacio de la Llave
1857: Jesús Terán Peredo
1857: Francisco del P. Cendejas
1857: José María Cortés y Esparza
1857: Benito Juárez García
1857–1858: José María Cortés y Esparza

- President Félix María Zuloaga

1858: Hilario Elguero
1858–1859: Juan Manuel Fernández de Jáuregui

- President Manuel Robles Pezuela

1859: Juan Manuel Fernández de Jáuregui

- President José Mariano Salas

1859: Juan Manuel Fernández de Jáuregui

- President Miguel Miramón

1859: Ignacio Anievas
1859: Teófilo Marín
1859: Antonio Corona
1860: José Ignacio de Anievas
1860: Isidro Díaz

- President José Ignacio Pavón

1859) : José Ignacio Anievas

- Emperor Maximilian I

1864: José María González de la Vega (Note: Minister of the Mexican Empire)
1864–1865: José María Cortés Esparza
1865–1866: José María Esteva
1866–1867: José Salazar Ilarregui
1867: Teófilo Marín
1867: José María Iribarren

- President Benito Juárez

1858–1858: Manuel Ruiz
1858–1858: Melchor Ocampo
1858–1858: Santos Degollado Sánchez
1858–1858: Ignacio de la Llave
1858–1859: Melchor Ocampo
1859–1860: Ignacio de la Llave
1860–1861: Manuel Ruiz
1861–1861: José Manuel de Emparan
1861–1861: Ignacio de la Llave
1861–1861: Pedro Ogazón
1861–1861: Francisco Zarco
1861–1861: León Guzmán
1861–1861: Manuel María de Zamacona
1861–1861: Juan José de la Garza
1861–1862: Manuel Doblado
1862–1862: Jesús Terán
1862–1862: Manuel Doblado
1862–1863: Juan Antonio de la Fuente
1863–1863: Manuel Doblado
1863–1863: Sebastián Lerdo de Tejada
1867–1868: Sebastián Lerdo de Tejada
1868–1868: Ignacio L. Vallarta
1868–1869: José María Iglesias
1869–1871: Manuel Saavedra
1871–1872: José María Castillo Velasco
1872–1872: Cayetano Gómez y Pérez

- President Sebastián Lerdo de Tejada

1876–1876: Cayetano Gómez Pérez
1876–1876: Juan José Baz

- President Porfirio Díaz

1876–1877: Protasio Tagle
1877–1879: Trinidad Garcia Brito
1879–1880: Eduardo Pankhurst
1880–1880: Felipe Berriozábal

- President Manuel González

1880–1884: Carlos Díez Gutiérrez

- President Porfirio Díaz

1884–1895: Manuel Romero Rubio
1895–1903: Manuel González Cosío
1903–1911: Ramón Corral

- President Francisco León de la Barra

1911–1911: Emilio Vázquez Gómez
1911–1911: Alberto García Granados

- President Francisco I. Madero

1911–1912: Abraham González
1912–1912: Jesús Flores Magón
1912–1913: Rafael Lorenzo Hernández

- President Pedro Lascuráin

1913–1913: Victoriano Huerta

- President Victoriano Huerta

1913–1913: Alberto García Granados
1913–1913: Aureliano Urrutia
1913–1913: Manuel Garza Aldape
1913–1914: Ignacio Alcocer

- President Francisco Carvajal

1914–1914: José María Luján

- President Venustiano Carranza

1914–1914: Eliseo Arredondo
1914–1915: Rafael Zubarán Capmany
1915–1915: Jesús Acuña
1915–1915: Adolfo de la Huerta
1917–1917: Jesús Acuña

- President Adolfo de la Huerta

1920–1920: Gilberto Valenzuela
1920–1920: José Inociencio Lugo

- President Álvaro Obregón

1920–1923: Plutarco Elías Calles
1923–1923: Gilberto Valenzuela
1923–1924: Enrique Colunga
1924–1924: Romeo Ortega

- President Plutarco Elías Calles

1924–1925: Romeo Ortega
1925: Gilberto Valenzuela
1925–1928: Adalberto Tejeda
1928: Gonzalo Vázquez Vela
1928: Emilio Portes Gil

- President Emilio Portes Gil

1928–1930: Felipe Canales

- President Pascual Ortiz Rubio

1930: Emilio Portes Gil
1930–1931: Carlos Riva Palacio
1931: Octavio Mendoza González
1931: Lázaro Cárdenas del Río
1931–1932: Manuel C. Téllez
1932–1934: Juan José Ríos

- President Abelardo L. Rodríguez

1932–1934: Eduardo Vasconcelos
1934: Narciso Bassols
1934: Juan D. Cabral

- President Lázaro Cárdenas del Río

1934–1935: Juan de Dios Bojórquez
1935–1936: Silvano Barba González
1936–1938: Silvestre Guerrero
1938–1940: Ignacio García Téllez

- President Manuel Ávila Camacho

1940–1945: Miguel Alemán
1945–1946: Primo Villa Michel

- President Miguel Alemán Valdés

1946–1948: Héctor Pérez Martínez
1948: Ernesto P. Uruchurtu
1948–1951: Adolfo Ruiz Cortines
1951–1952: Ernesto P. Uruchurtu

- President Adolfo Ruiz Cortines

1952–1958: Ángel Carvajal Bernal

- President Adolfo López Mateos

1958–1963: Gustavo Díaz Ordaz
1963–1964: Luis Echeverría Álvarez

- President Gustavo Díaz Ordaz

1964–1969: Luis Echeverría Álvarez
1969–1970: Mario Moya Palencia

- President Luis Echeverría

1970–1976: Mario Moya Palencia

- President José López Portillo

1976–1979: Jesús Reyes Heroles
1979–1982: Enrique Olivares Santana

- President Miguel de la Madrid

1982–1988: Manuel Bartlett

- President Carlos Salinas de Gortari

1988–1993: Fernando Gutiérrez Barrios
1993–1994: Patrocinio González Garrido
1994–1994: Jorge Carpizo McGregor

- President Ernesto Zedillo

1994–1995: Esteban Moctezuma
1995–1998: Emilio Chuayffet
1998–1999: Francisco Labastida
1999–2000: Diódoro Carrasco Altamirano

- President Vicente Fox

2000–2005: Santiago Creel
2005–2006: Carlos Abascal

- President Felipe Calderón

2006–2008: Francisco Javier Ramírez Acuña
2008: Juan Camilo Mouriño (died in office)
2008–2010: Fernando Gómez Mont
2010–2011: Francisco Blake Mora (died in office)
2011–2012: Alejandro Poiré Romero

- President Enrique Peña Nieto

2012–2018: Miguel Ángel Osorio Chong
2018: Alfonso Navarrete Prida

- President Andrés Manuel López Obrador

2018–2021: Olga Sánchez Cordero
2021–2023: Adán Augusto López Hernández
2023: Alejandro Encinas Rodríguez
2023–2024: Luisa María Alcalde Luján

- President Claudia Sheinbaum

2024–present: Rosa Icela Rodríguez

== See also ==
- Interior minister
