= Federico Gamboa =

Mexican author and diplomat (1864–1939)

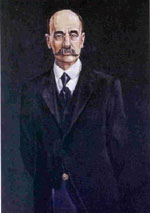

Lieutenant Secretary of Foreign Relations of Mexico
- In office April – May 1910
- President: Porfirio Díaz
- Preceded by: Ignacio Mariscal
- Succeeded by: Enrique C. Creel

Secretary of Foreign Affairs
- In office 11 August – 24 September 1913
- President: Victoriano Huerta
- Preceded by: Manuel Garza Aldape
- Succeeded by: Antonio de la Peña y Reyes

Personal details
- Born: December 22, 1864 Mexico City, Mexico
- Died: August 15, 1939 (74 years) Mexico City, Mexico
- Party: Partido Católico Nacional
- Spouse: María Sagaseta

Federico Gamboa Iglesias (22 December 1864 – 15 August 1939) was a writer and diplomat from Mexico. He has been considered as one of the top representatives of Naturalism in México. Gamboa wrote novels, theater pieces, articles for newspapers and magazines and an autobiography when he was 28 years old. For many years he took notes of his travels, experiences and thoughts, which he later published as five diaries. Posthumously another two volumes of his diaries were published.

== Life as a Mexican diplomat ==
Federico Gamboa was born and died in Mexico City. He studied to become a notary in the National School of Law, but both of his parents died and he was forced to drop out and start working in 1884. He began as an assistant in a Civil Court and also began on his journalist career. In El Diario del Hogar newspaper he had a regular article called Desde mi mesa (From my table), which he signed as «La Corcadiere». Even though he was doing well for himself, he was not satisfied and joined the public service.

After passing all the tests, he joined the Mexican Foreign Affairs Service as second secretary on 9 October 1888. Gamboa was 24 years old when he was sent to Guatemala; afterwards he worked for the Mexican Embassy in Argentina. From 12 August to 24 September 1913 he was the Secretary of Foreign Affairs but he ended his diplomatic career after only forty four days to run for President, along with general Eugenio Rascón as vicepresident, for the National Catholic Party on 26 October 1913. He lost to Victoriano Huerta and Aureliano Blanquet.

== Porfiriato ==
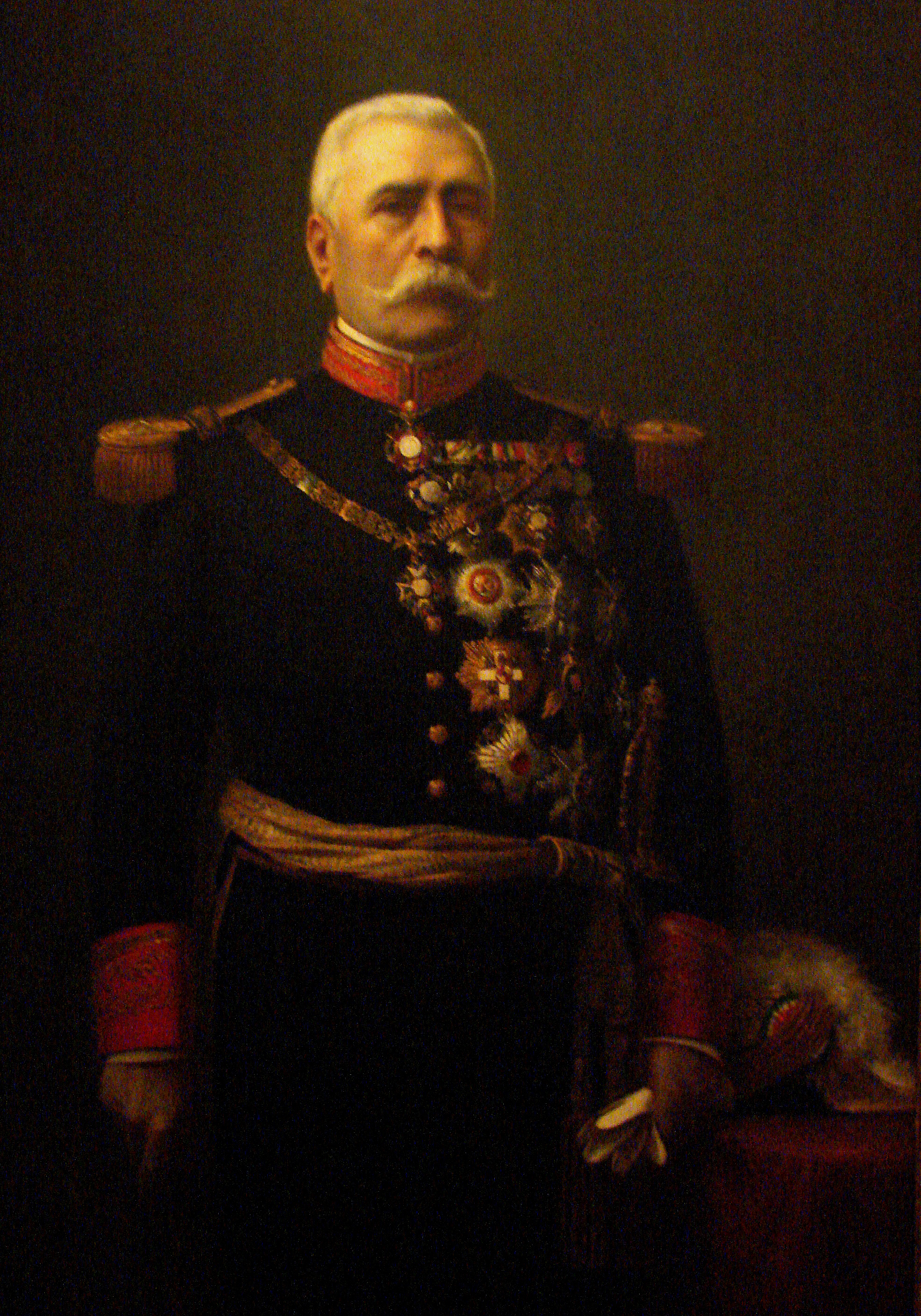
Porfirio Díaz, president of Mexico.

Federico Gamboa is well known as one of the most representative Mexican novelist of Porfirio Díaz regime; José Emilio Pacheco pointed out that Gamboa was «a geographic anomaly that found its place in the Porfirian society». Gamboa was, primarily, a man that searched for a good life from that time as the end of his life. For the writer and diplomat, being part of Porfirio Díaz government was more than a chance event: it was for him an inevitable destiny. However, the reality of the Mexican Revolution changed his destiny. Porfirio Díaz left office in May 1911 and Gamboa received him in Europe and was able to keep his diplomatic post as ambassador in the Netherlands. During the Victoriano Huerta presidency he was invited to lead the Secretariat of Foreign Affairs; he led the Secretariat for forty-four days and then left to run for president, but lost against Huerta. His return to México marked the end of Gamboa's good life as a public servant. Furthermore, during Venustiano Carranza presidency, Gamboa had to leave Mexico along with his wife María Sagaseta and his only child, going first to the United States and then to La Habana, Cuba, from 1914 to 1919.

== Works ==
=== Novels ===
His novels are:

- Del natural. Esbozos contemporáneos. (1889)
- Apariencias
- Unauthorized version of Apariencias (1892) in El Oeste in Mercedes, Argentina
- Suprema Ley (1896)
- Unauthorized version of Suprema Ley (1913) in a Caracas, Venezuela newspaper.
- Metamorfosis (1899)
- Santa (1903)
- Reconquista (1908)
- La llaga (1913)
- El evangelista: novel about Mexican customs (1922)

=== Autobiography and memoirs ===
- Impresiones y recuerdos (1893)
- Mi Diario. Primera Serie I: 1892–1896, (1908)
- Mi Diario I (1892–1896) Mucho de mi vida y algo de la de otros Introducción de José Emilio Pacheco
- Mi Diario, Primera Serie II: 1897–1900, (1910)
- Mi Diario, Primera Serie III: 1901–1904, (1920)
- Mi Diario, Mucho de mi vida y algo de la de otros, Segunda Serie I: 1905–1908, (1934)
- Mi Diario IV (1905–1908) Mucho de mi vida y algo de la de otros
- Mi Diario, Mucho de mi vida y algo de la de otros, Segunda Serie II: 1909–1911(1938)
- Mi Diario VI (1912–1919) Mucho de mi vida y algo de la de otros (1995) Posthumous.
- MI Diario VII (1920–1939) Mucho de mi vida y algo de la de otros (1996) Posthumous.

=== Theater ===
His theater pieces are :

- La última campaña (1894): social comedy in three acts and prose; opened in Teatro Principal of Mexico City on 11 May 1894.
- Divertirse (1894): Monologue in prose. Opened on 6 June 1894 in the National Theatre in Mexico City.
- La venganza de la Gleba (1904)
- A buena cuenta (1907) Drama, San Salvador. Opened on 6 February 1914 in Teatro Ideal in Mexico City.
- Entre hermanos (1925), Tragedy; opened on 19 May 1928 in Teatro Arbeu, México.

=== Journalism ===
- (1884) Proof reader of El Foro, a journal of Law.
- (1885–1887) Reporter, writer and chronicler for El Diario del Hogar. Finally, has his own space in 1886:Celajes de la ópera sign with the pseudonym «La Cocardière». A short while later, the column is called Desde mi mesa (From my table).
- (1888) writer for El Lunes. Starts to sign the articles under his name.
- (1894–1895) Federico Gamboa and Ángel de Campo published in El Mundo the article Siluetas que pasan, that they wrote under the pseudonyms of Bouvard or Pécuchet.
- (1915–1917) Interim director (1915), writer, in charge of translating into Spanish articles originally in English, French and Italian; in charge of the bibliographic section La Reforma Social magazine, in La Habana, Cuba.
- (1926–1939) wrote an article on a weekly basis for El Universal.

=== Essays ===
- La novela mexicana (1914). This was a conference presented in the General Bookstore of Francisco Gamoneda on 3 January 1914. Printed the same year in México by México Eusebio Gómez de la Puente.
- La confesión de un palacio. Essay about Mexican national history.
- Un baile en Palacio, in collaboration with Gustavo Baz (1887)

=== Motion pictures based on his novels ===
- Suprema Ley (1896): made into a movie in 1936 and opened on 19 March 1937 in the Rex Cinema. Directed by Rafael E. Portas, it starred Andrés Soler and Gloria Morel.
- Santa (1903) has been made into a movie four times in Mexico: in 1918, silent version directed by Luis G. Peredo with Elena Sánchez Valenzuela; in 1932, directed by Antonio Moreno, with a song from Agustín Lara and starring Lupita Tovar -this movie has been named within the best 100 films ever made in Mexico. In 1943, another version, directed by Norman Foster and starring Esther Fernandez, opened on June 10 in cinema Palacio and its showings lasted four weeks. Finally, in 1969 there Emilio Gómez Muriel directed the latest version.

There is a version made in Spain in 1991, directed by Paul Leduc and called Latino Bar and a free adaptation made in 1949, directed by Fernando de Fuentes, starring Esther Fernández and called Hipólito el de Santa.

- La Llaga (1913)
- Entre Hermanos (1928): made into a movie in 1945 directed by Ramón Peón on a script written by Emilio Fernández, Mauricio Magdaleno and Carlos Velo. It starred Pedro Armendáriz, Carmen Montejo, Rafael Baledón and Anita Blanch.

== Notes and references ==
=== Bibliography ===
- Academia Mexicana correspondiente de la española (1940). Homenaje a don Federico Gamboa (in Spanish). México: Imprenta Universitaria de México.
- Carreño, Alberto María (1946). "La obra personal de los miembros de la Academia Mexicana correspondiente de la Española". Memorias de la Academia Mexicana de la Lengua correspondiente de la Española (in Spanish). VIII. México: SEP.
- Chasteen, John Charles (2010). Santa: A Novel of Mexico City by Federico Gamboa (in Spanish). EE.UU.: University of North Carolina Press.
- Domínguez Michael, Christopher (1996). Antología de la narrativa mexicana del siglo XX (in Spanish). Vol. I. México: Fondo de Cultura Económica. ISBN 968-16-4394-1.
- García Barragán, María Guadalupe (1988). "Bibliografía de Federico Gamboa". Boletín de Investigaciones Bibliográficas (in Spanish) (2). México: UNAM: 109–148.
- Gutiérrez, Harim B. (2005). En el país de la tristeza. Las misiones diplomáticas de Federico Gamboa en Guatemala (in Spanish). México: SRE/Acervo Histórico diplomático.
- Junco, Alfonso (1975). Semblanzas de académicos (ed.). "Nuestros centenarios: humanistas mexicanos" (in Spanish). México: Ediciones del Centenario de la Academia Mexicana. pp. 99–101.
- Moore, Ernest R. (1940). "Bibliografía de obras y crítica de Federico Gamboa, 1864–1930". Revista Iberoamericana (in Spanish). II (3). Pittsburgh, Pennsylvania: University of Pittsburgh.
- Olea Franco, Rafael (2005). Santa, Santa nuestra (in Spanish). México: El Colegio de México.
- Pacheco, José Emilio (1977). "Selección, notas y prólogo". Diario de Federico Gamboa 1892–1939 (in Spanish). México: Siglo XXI.
- Prendes Guardiola, Manuel (2002). La novela naturalista de Federico Gamboa (in Spanish). Logroño: Universidad de la Rioja.
- Sandoval, Adriana (2012). Todos somos iguales frente a las tentaciones. Una Antología General. Federico Gamboa. Biblioteca Americana, serie Viajes al Siglo XIX (in Spanish). México: Fondo de Cultura Económica, Universidad Nacional Autónoma de México (UNAM), Fundación para las letras Mexicanas (f,l,m.).
- Secretaría de Relaciones Exteriores (2003). Escritores en la diplomacia Mexicana. 3 Tomos (in Spanish). México: SRE.

=== Works by Gamboa ===
- Gamboa, Federico (1892). Jacobo Peuser (ed.). Apariencias (in Spanish). Buenos Aires, Argentina.
- Gamboa, Federico (1922) [1893]. Gómez de la Puente, Eusebio (ed.). Impresiones y recuerdos (in Spanish) (2nd ed.). México.
- Gamboa, Federico (1994) [1893]. Impresiones y recuerdos (in Spanish) (1st ed.). México: Consejo Nacional para la Cultura y las Artes.
- — (2012a) [1893]. "Impresiones y recuerdos". Todos somos iguales frente a las tentaciones. Una Antología General. Federico Gamboa. Biblioteca Americana, serie Viajes al Siglo XIX (in Spanish) (1st ed.). México: Fondo de Cultura Económica (FCE), Universidad Nacional Autónoma de México (UNAM), Fundación para las letras Mexicanas (f,l,m.).
- — (1894). La última campaña (in Spanish) (1st ed.). México: Tipografía, litografía y encuadernación de I. Paz.
- — (1896). Suprema Ley (in Spanish) (1st ed.). París; México: Librería de la Vda. De Ch. Bouret.
- — (1915) [1899]. Gómez de la Puente, Eusebio (ed.). Del natural. Esbozos contemporáneaos (in Spanish) (3rd ed.). México.
- — (2012b) [1899]. "Del natural. Esbozos contemporáneaos". Todos somos iguales frente a las tentaciones. Una Antología General. Federico Gamboa. Biblioteca Americana, serie Viajes al Siglo XIX (in Spanish) (1st ed.). México: Fondo de Cultura Económica (FCE), Universidad Nacional Autónoma de México (UNAM), Fundación para las letras Mexicanas (f,l,m.).
- — (1900). La última campaña (in Spanish) (2nd ed.). Guatemala: Síguere y Cía.
- — (1938) [1903]. Santa (in Spanish) (11th ed.). México: Botas.
- — (1937) [1908]. Gómez de la Puente, Eusebio (ed.). Reconquista (in Spanish) (2nd ed.). México: Botas.
- — (1947) [1913]. La llaga (in Spanish) (3rd ed.). México: Botas, COLI.
- — (1910). Gómez de la Puente, Eusebio (ed.). Mi diario, primera serie (PDF) (in Spanish). México: La Europea. Archived from the original (PDF) on 2015-06-04.
- — (1920a). Gómez de la Puente, Eusebio (ed.). Mi diario, primera serie (in Spanish). Vol. III. México: Hispano Americana. Archived from the original on 2015-06-05.
- — (1920b). Gómez de la Puente, Eusebio (ed.). Suprema Ley (in Spanish) (2nd ed.). México: México, Eusebio Gomez de la Puente.
- — (1927) [1922]. El evangelista: novela de costumbres mexicanas (in Spanish) (2nd ed.). México: Librería Guadalupana.
- — (1965a) [1922]. El evangelista: novela de costumbres mexicanas (in Spanish). México: La Prensa.
- — (1965b). Novelas, prólogo de Francisco Monterde (in Spanish). México: Fondo de Cultura Económica.
- — (2000). Teatro; edición, estudio preliminar, biografía, cronología, bibliografía y notas de María Guadalupe García Barragán (in Spanish). México: UNAM, Coordinación de Humanidades.
- — (2005) [1922]. "El evangelista: novela de costumbres mexicanas". Colección Relato, Licenciado Vidriera (in Spanish). 27. México: UNAM, Coordinación de Difusión Cultural, Dirección General de Publicaciones y Fomento Editorial.

Preceded by Ignacio Mariscal	Secretary of Foreign Affairs of Mexico; 1910	Succeeded by Enrique C. Creel Cuilty
Preceded by Manuel Garza Aldape	Secretary of Foreign Affairs of Mexico; 1913	Succeeded by Antonio de la Peña y Reyes
