= Aureliano Urrutia =

Mexican politician

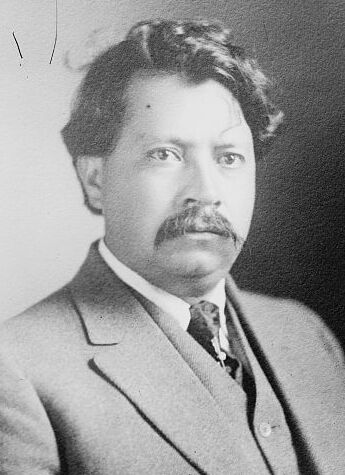

Secretary of the Interior
- In office 13 June 1913 – 14 September 1913
- President: Victoriano Huerta
- Preceded by: Alberto García Granados
- Succeeded by: Manuel Garza Aldape

Personal details
- Born: Aureliano Urrutia Sandoval; 6 June 1872 Xochimilco, Mexico City, Mexico
- Died: 14 August 1975 (aged 103) San Antonio, Texas, United States

Aureliano Urrutia, Sr. (6 June 1872 – 14 August 1975) was a Mexican-born physician. He served as the Minister of Interior under Victoriano Huerta in Mexico but subsequently spent most of his life and career in the United States.

== Biography ==
Urrutia was born in Xochimilco, Federal District, Mexico, on 6 June 1872, the son of Pedro Urrutia and Refugio Sandoval, of indigenous descent. He studied in Xochimilco and Mexico City. Urrutia earned a degree in medicine from the National School of Medicine in 1890 and was considered the best student of his generation. In 1893 he served as a military doctor in the territory of Quintana Roo. Later he became a member of the 3rd battalion stationed in Chilpancingo; there he met General Victoriano Huerta, who many years later, in June 1913, appointed Urrutia to the position of Minister of the Interior. After a few months, he resigned from that post and returned to his profession as a surgeon. As the political situation across Mexico was deteriorating around this time, Urrutia in 1914 moved his family to Veracruz, and later moved to Galveston, Texas during the American occupation of Veracruz. From there they moved to San Antonio, where he lived for the remainder of his life, practicing and teaching medicine.

In San Antonio, Urrutia built a home, which he named Quinta Urrutia, then, in 1921, another property named Miraflores. The grounds and gardens of Miraflores feature extensive statuary and other classical and Mexican indigenous art. Miraflores has been preserved and as of the 2020s there are no plans for restoration.

Urrutia died on 14 August 1975 in San Antonio at the age of 103, and was buried at the San Fernando No. 2 cemetery there.

== Publications ==
- Dr. Urrutia's clinic: One month's work (1922)
