= José María Montoya =

Mexican diplomat

Jose María Montoya

Chargé d'affaires of Mexico to the United States (ad interim)
- In office 10 September 1828 – February 1830
- President: Pablo Obregón
- Preceded by: José María Tornel
- In office 6 June 1831 – 31 December 1833
- Preceded by: José María Tornel
- Succeeded by: Joaquín María del Castillo y Lanzas

Jose María Montoya was a Mexican diplomat who served twice as ad interim chargé d'affaires of Mexico to the United States of America (1828–1830 and 1831–1833).

During his first stint as chargé d'affaires, Montoya substituted Envoy Pablo Obregón, a former colonel in the Army of the Three Guarantees who committed suicide at the embassy in August 1828.

From February 1830 to June 1831, he was substituted by José María Tornel, who served several times as secretary of War in the cabinet of Antonio López de Santa Anna. When Tornel returned to Mexico, Montoya was reappointed as chargé and held the post until 31 December 1833, when he was substituted by Joaquín María del Castillo y Lanzas.

Montoya kept working at the embassy as trade commissioner (in Spanish: encargado de negocios), and was substituted in that post by the ephemeral Mexican emperor, Agustín de Iturbide.
