= Jesús Mario Acuña Fadul =

Mexican politician

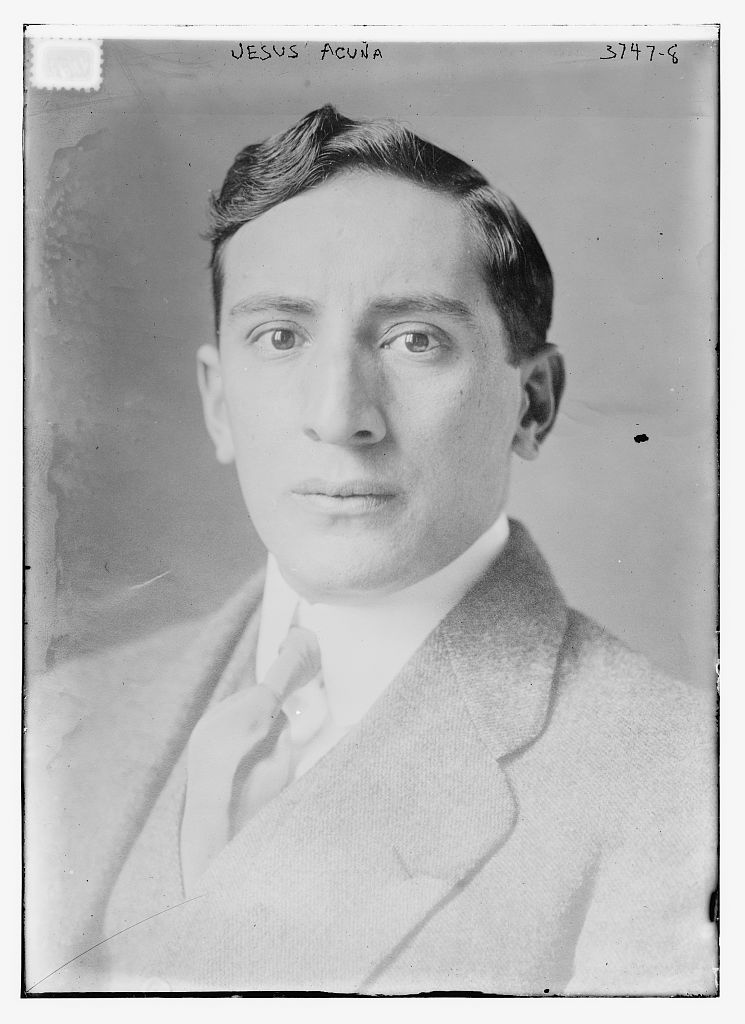
Jesús Mario Acuña Fadul

Jesús Mario Acuña Fadul (1886–1931) was the Secretary of Foreign Affairs under Venustiano Carranza in Mexico from 1915 to 1916.

== Biography ==
He was born in Coahuila, Mexico and attended the College of San Juan Nepomuceno in Saltillo. He was the Secretary of Foreign Affairs under Venustiano Carranza in Mexico from 1915 to 1916.
