= Francisco Pizarro Martínez =

Mexican diplomat

Envoy Extraordinary and Minister Plenipotentiary of Mexico to the United States
- In office 17 October 1837 – 9 February 1840
- Preceded by: Joaquín María del Castillo (interim)
- Succeeded by: Joaquín Velázquez de León (interim)

Personal details
- Born: Francisco Xavier de la Paz Pizarro Martínez; 24 January 1787 Mexico City, New Spain
- Died: 9 February 1840 (aged 53) Washington, D.C., United States
- Resting place: Mount Olivet Cemetery, section 61, lot 62. 38.911372°N 76.979449°W
- Spouse: Marie Thérèse Visoso (m. 1814)
- Children: Victoria (1815), Juan Bautista Francisco (1816-1819), Mauricio Carlos Francisco Antonio (1819), Antoinette Victoria Luisa (1823-1853), Francisco Xavier Luis (1824-1889), Sebastian (1827-1878), Teresa (1829), Eugenio Juan Bautista Evaristo (1830), Teresa Helena (1833-1895).
- Parent(s): Timoteo Antonio Pizarro and Antonia San Martin

Francisco Xavier de la Paz Pizarro Martínez (24 January 1787 – 9 February 1840) was a Mexican diplomat who served as Envoy Extraordinary and Minister Plenipotentiary of Mexico to the United States from 17 October 1837 until his death on 9 February 1840. Previously, Pizarro served as Mexican consul to New Orleans.

== Biography ==
Francisco Pizarro was born in Mexico City on 24 January 1787 to Timoteo Antonio Pizarro López and Antonia San Martín Pérez, a Spanish couple from Alcántara, Extremadura, and Cádiz, respectively. At 27, he married Marie Thérèse Visoso, a native of New Orleans, Louisiana, and daughter of a Galician immigrant, on 27 April 1814.

In 1833, as Mexican consul of New Orleans, Pizarro refused entry to blacks and other "people of color" to the then-Mexican state of Coahuila y Texas, claiming that they were slaves in disguise and inherently lazy and immoral. After the Texas Revolution, he negotiated a prisoner exchange with Stephen F. Austin in the winter of 1836.

In May 1837, he was appointed Envoy Extraordinary and Minister Plenipotentiary of Mexico to the United States by President Anastasio Bustamante. As envoy, he negotiated the Convention for the adjustment of claims of citizens of the United States of America upon the Government of the Mexican Republic with John Forsyth in 1838.

Shortly thereafter, Pizarro died while on duty on 9 February 1840, at the age of 53, in Washington, D.C. The President of the United States, his cabinet, and members of the diplomatic corps were present at his Catholic funeral. He was originally interred behind the Chapel of St. Francis Xavier on College Ground (a burial ground of the Holy Trinity Church) in the historical neighborhood of Georgetown. In 1953, when Georgetown University cleared the cemetery for the construction of new buildings, his remains were transferred to Mount Olivet Cemetery.
