= Pablo Obregón =

Mexican politician

Envoy of Mexico to the United States
- In office 18 November 1824 – 10 September 1828
- Preceded by: José Anastasio Torrens
- Succeeded by: José María Montoya (interim)

Member of the Chamber of Deputies (Mexico)
- In office 24 February 1822 – 21 July 1824

Personal details
- Born: c. 1796 León, Guanajuato, New Spain
- Died: 10 September 1828 (aged 31–32) Philadelphia, United States

Pablo Obregón (c. 1796 – 10 September 1828) was a young Mexican colonel in the Army of the Three Guarantees who served as minister plenipotentiary of Mexico to the United States from 18 November 1824 until his death by suicide on 10 September 1828.
