= Romeo Ortega =

Mexican-French control scientist

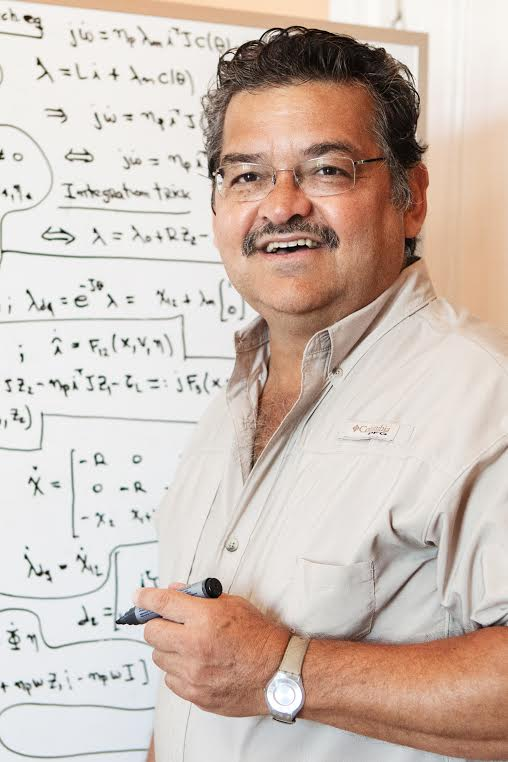
- Born: Mexico
- Citizenship: Mexican
- Education: National University of Mexico
- Known for: Nonlinear and adaptive control methods
- Scientific career
- Fields: Control systems
- Workplaces: Supélec, ITMO University, ITAM
- Doctoral advisor: Ioan Doré Landau

Romeo Ortega, born in Mexico, is a Mexican-French control scientist and distinguished professor. He is head of the Adaptive and Nonlinear Control Systems Lab in St. Petersburg, Russia, and a full professor at the Mexico Autonomous Institute of Technology (ITAM) in Mexico City.

== Education ==
Year	Degree	University
1974	BSc in Electrical and Mechanical Engineering	National University of Mexico, Mexico
1978	Master of Engineering	Polytechnical Institute of Leningrad (now Saint Petersburg), USSR
1984	Docteur D'Etat	Polytechnical Institute of Grenoble, France

== Career ==
Year	Position	University
1984–1989	Lecturer	Polytechnical Institute of Grenoble, France
1987–1988	Visiting professor	University of Illinois, USA
1991–1992	Visiting professor	McGill University, Canada
1992–present	CNRS Research Director	Laboratoire de Signaux et Systemes (SUPELEC), France
2013–present	Head of laboratory	Adaptive and nonlinear control systems lab of ITMO University
2020–present	Full professor	Mexico Autonomous Institute of Technology (ITAM)

=== Membership ===
In 1990-1991 Romeo Ortega was a fellow of the Japan Society for Promotion of Science. Since June 1992 Romeo Ortega is a member of the French National Researcher Council CNRS). Since 1999 he is a Fellow Member of the IEEE. From January 2020, Romeo Ortega is member of the Mexico National Researchers System (SNI) level 3.

== Publications ==
Professor Ortega authored and co-authored more than 550 papers with more than 25000 citations. His h-index is 97 (Dec 2024).

== See also ==
- Adaptive control
- Control theory
