= Manuel de Aspiroz =

Mexican statesman and diplomat

Manuel de Azpiroz (c. 1836–April 24, 1905) was a Mexican statesman and diplomat.

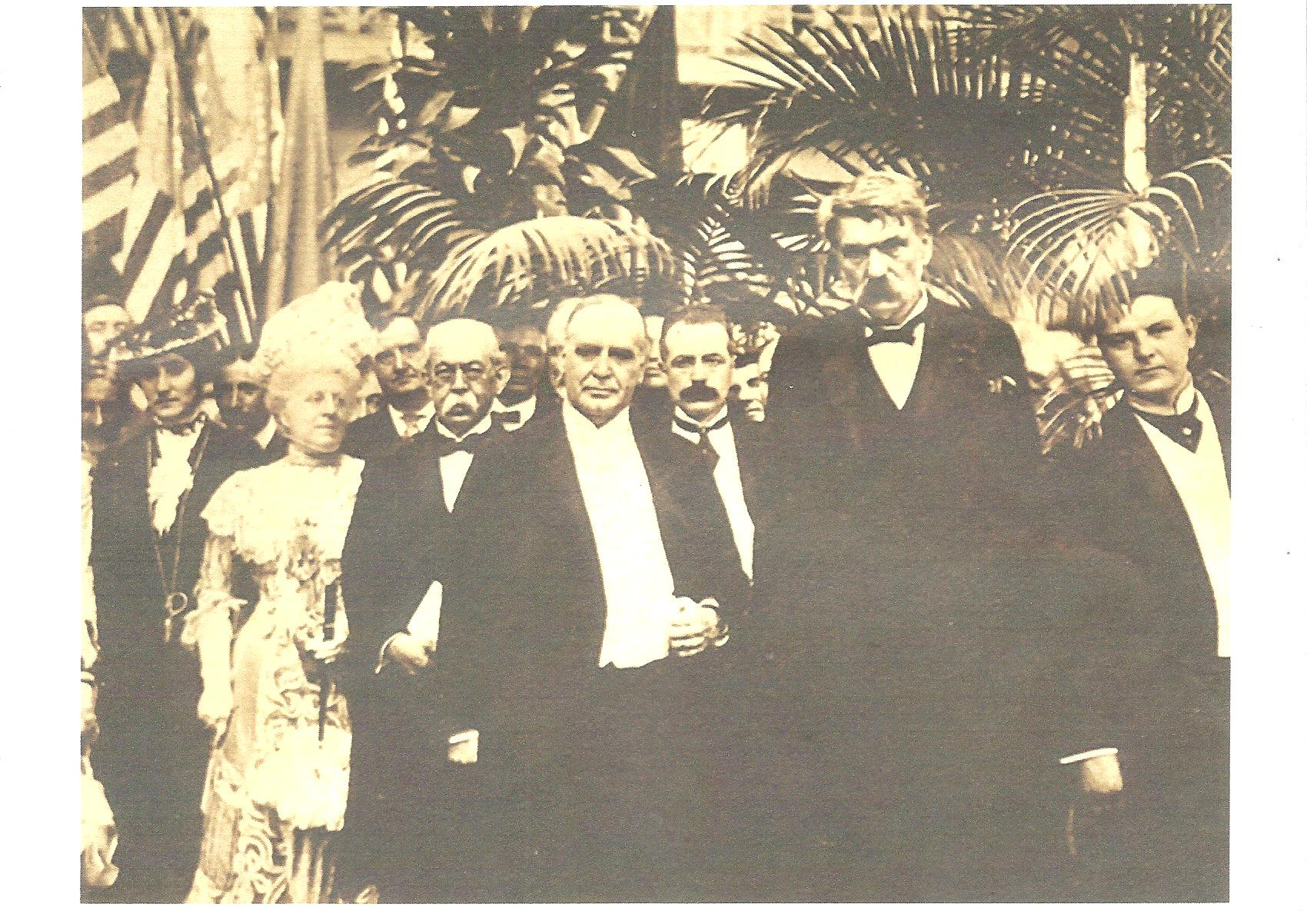
The "Last Posed Photograph" of President McKinley. Ambassador Azpiroz can be seen to the left of President McKinley (center). September 5, 1901.

== Life ==
He was born in Puebla, Puebla, and was educated at the University of Mexico (now UNAM), where he took his degree in 1855. He took part in the overthrowing of the emperor Maximilian I of Mexico, and in 1867, on the establishment of the republic, was appointed assistant secretary of state for foreign affairs (1868-1872). In 1873 he became Mexican consul at San Francisco, where he remained till his election to the Senate (1875). He was professor of jurisprudence at the college of Puebla from 1883 to 1890, when he was again appointed assistant Secretary of Foreign Affairs. From 1899 until he died in 1905 he served as Mexican ambassador to the United States; he was present at the Pan-American Exposition in 1901, when William McKinley was fatally shot.

He participated in the war council that condemned and executed Emperor Maximilian, Miguel Miramón and Tomás Mejía, after capture by the Liberals, in 1867. He also served as Mexican consul in San Francisco and was the first Mexican ambassador in the United States. His remains were interred on April 24, 1905 at the Rotunda of Illustrious Persons.

Among his writings may be mentioned; Código de extranjería de los Estados Unidos Mexicanos (1876), and La liberdad civil como base del derecho internacional privado (1896).
