= Ignacio Mariscal =

Mexican politician

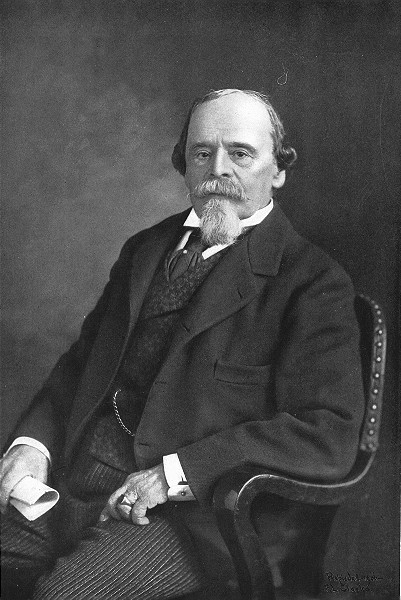

Secretary of Foreign Affairs
- In office 1 December 1885 – 17 April 1910
- President: Porfirio Díaz
- Preceded by: Joaquin Baranda
- Succeeded by: Federico Gamboa
- In office 29 November 1880 – 15 September 1883
- President: Porfirio Díaz; Manuel González
- Preceded by: Miguel Ruelas
- Succeeded by: José Fernández
- In office 25 May 1871 – 12 June 1872
- President: Benito Juárez
- Preceded by: Manuel Azpíroz
- Succeeded by: José María Lafragua

Personal details
- Born: July 5, 1829
- Died: April 17, 1910 (aged 80)
- Relations: Married
- Education: Oaxaca Institute of Arts and Sciences
- Profession: Diplomat
- Website: sre.gob.mx

Ignacio Mariscal (Oaxaca, Mexico July 5, 1829 – Mexico City April 17, 1910) was a Mexican liberal lawyer, politician, writer, and diplomat. He was named Secretary of Foreign Affairs in 1871–72, for the first time during the Benito Juárez administration. During the Porfirio Díaz's government, he held the office in 1880–83 and 1885–1910. In 1909, he was the President of Mexican Academy of the Language.

== Biography ==
Mariscal was born in Oaxaca, Mexico on July 5, 1829; his father were deputy during the Mexican–American War. He studied law at the Oaxaca Institute of Arts and Sciences, where he obtained his bachelor's degree in 1849.

For his opposition to the pro Santa Anna's governor, Ignacio Martínez Pinillo, he moved to Mexico City in 1854. With the triumph of the liberals, Juárez invited him to take part of the Juan Álvarez administration. He was named advisor on the implementation of Ecclesiastical Confiscations Law.

For his law knowledge and experience, his was elected as deputy of the 1857 Constituent Congress of Mexico. This Congress drew up the Constitution of 1857. He was member of the Judicial Committee where he took part on the debates related to the military and ecclesiastical Fuero. With the beginning of the Reform War, he traveled with President Juárez to Veracruz.

== Writings ==
He wrote several books; among them:

- Exposición sobre el código de procedimientos penales (1880) México;
- Historia de las dificultades entre México y Guatemala. Proyectada Intervención de Estados Unidos. Algunos documentos oficiales (1882);
- Discursos de los Exmos. Señores L. Marroquín é I. Mariscal en la Academia Mexicana de la Lengua (1899) México: Imp. Francisco Díaz de León.
- Memoria que en cumplimiento del precepto constitucional presenta al duodécimo Congreso de la Unión, el C. Ignacio Mariscal rendido ante el Senado acerca del tratado de límites entre Yucatán y Belice (1893) México;
- El Cuervo, original de Edgar Allan Poe, traducción (1895);
- Concurso científico nacional (1897);
- Don Nicolás Bravo o la clemencia mexicana (1900);
- Juárez y el libro de Bulnes (1904);
- Episodios en la vida de Juárez (1906);
- Poesías (1911) Madrid. Editor Balbino Dávalos.
