= José Manuel Zozaya =

Mexican politician

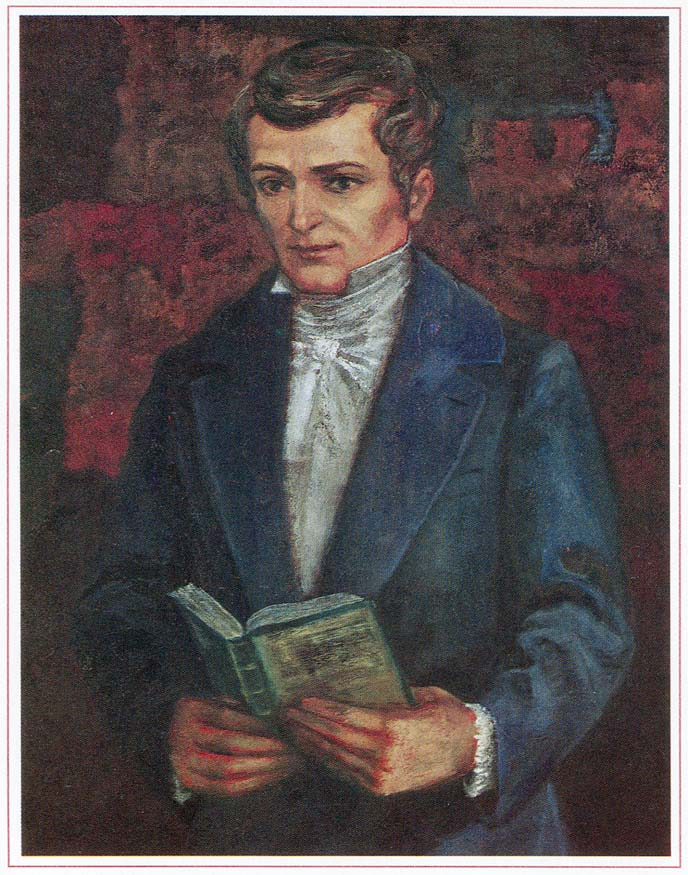

Envoy Extraordinary and Minister Plenipotentiary of Mexico to the United States
- In office 12 December 1822 – 20 May 1823
- Succeeded by: José Anastasio Torrens (interim)

Personal details
- Born: José Manuel Zozaya y Bermúdez; 4 July 1778 Salvatierra, Guanajuato
- Died: 21 June 1853 (aged 74) Mexico City
- Spouse(s): His niece, Joaquina de Zozaya y Gurtubay (m. 1803–1820) and María de los Ángeles Gómez de la Casa y Gallo
- Parent(s): Francisco Zozaya y Zorilla (city councillor) and Gertruidis Bermúdez y de la Fuente
- Education: San Ildefonso College

José Manuel Zozaya y Bermúdez (4 July 1778 – 21 June 1853) was the first Mexican diplomat to ever represent his country in the United States, serving as Envoy Extraordinary and Minister Plenipotentiary from 12 December 1822 to 20 May 1823.

Aside from his diplomatic activities, Zozaya served as attorney-in-fact of Agustín de Iturbide, as congressman for Guanajuato (1820), as auditor for the Army, and operated the first paper mill in the history of Mexico.

== Works ==
- Apelacion al tribunal de la opinion publica que interpone el C. José Manuel Zozaya por la injusta y atroz esclusiva ejercida por el señor Gobernador y Junta Departamental de México, para la provision de los juzgados de primera instancia (1839).
- Oración cívica pronunciada en la Alameda el 27 de octubre de 1841, por el Sr. Lic. d. Manuel Bermúdez Zozaya, [sic] Auditor de Guerra de la Comandancia General de México (1841).
