= Joaquín María del Castillo y Lanzas =

Mexican politician

Secretary of the Interior, Foreign Affairs and Police
- In office 7 January 1846 – 1846
- President: Mariano Paredes
- In office 10 July 1858 – 1859

Secretary of Finance (ad interim)
- In office 20 April 1846 – 1 May 1846
- President: Mariano Paredes

Envoy Extraordinary and Minister Plenipotentiary of Mexico to the United Kingdom
- In office 8 August 1853 – 6 December 1855
- Preceded by: Francisco Facio
- Succeeded by: José María González de la Vega

Chargé d'affaires of Mexico to the United States (ad interim)
- In office 1 January 1834 – 19 March 1836
- Preceded by: José María Montoya
- Succeeded by: Manuel Eduardo de Gorostiza
- In office 5 November 1836 – 13 October 1837
- Preceded by: Manuel Eduardo de Gorostiza
- Succeeded by: Francisco Pizarro Martínez

Personal details
- Born: 11 November 1801 Xalapa, Veracruz
- Died: 6 July 1878 (aged 76) Mexico City
- Education: University of Glasgow

Joaquín María del Castillo y Lanzas (11 November 1801 – 6 July 1878) was a Mexican politician who served twice as Secretary of Foreign Affairs (1846 and 1858–1859) and ten days as interim Secretary of Finance (1846) in the cabinet of Mariano Paredes.

As a diplomat, he also served as Envoy Extraordinary and Minister Plenipotentiary of Mexico to the United Kingdom (1853–1855) and twice as chargé d'affaires of Mexico to the United States (1834–1836 and 1836–1837).

Aside from his political and diplomatic activities, Del Castillo wrote poetry, worked as a journalist and editor for several publications and translated the works of Lord Byron.

== Biography ==
He was born on 11 November 1801. He served as Envoy Extraordinary and Minister Plenipotentiary of Mexico to the United Kingdom from 1853 to 1855. He died on 6 July 1878

== Works ==
- Poesías de Joaquín María de Castillo y Lanzas, nativo de Jalapa (1826)
- La victoria de Tamaulipas (1832)
- Discurso pronunciado en la Alameda de México el 16 de setiembre de 1863 por D. Joaquín de Castillo y Lanzas (1865)
- Memorias históricas de Napoleón (1882)
