= Guadalupe Martínez =

Mexican footballer (born 1983)

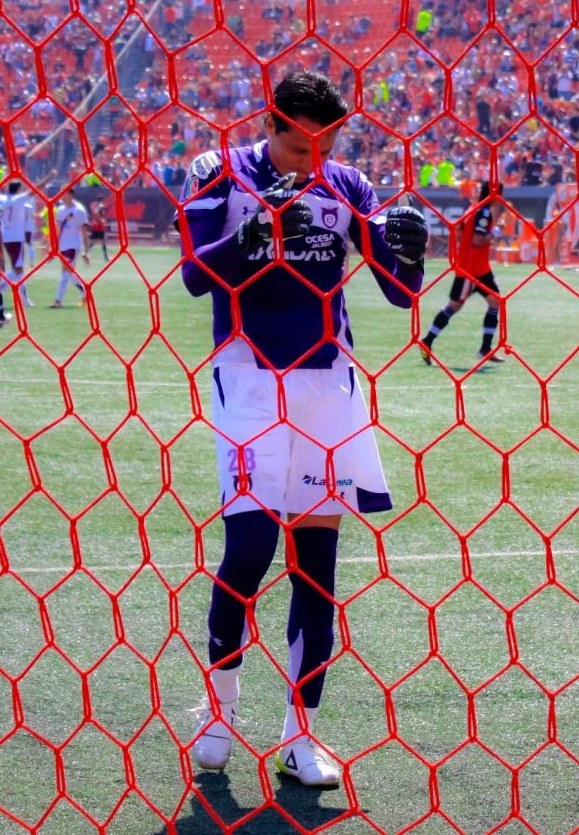

Personal information
- Full name: Jose Guadalupe Martínez Álvarez
- Date of birth: 27 January 1983 (age 43)
- Place of birth: León, Guanajuato, Mexico
- Height: 1.89 m (6 ft 2 in)
- Position: Goalkeeper

Senior career*
Years	Team	Apps	(Gls)
2002–2014	Tecos	36	(0)
2005	→ Querétano (loan)	0	(0)
2005–2006	→ Tijuana (loan)	33	(0)
2007–2008	→ Puebla (loan)	18	(0)
2008–2010	→ Querétano (loan)	30	(0)
2010	→ Leones Negros (loan)	17	(0)
2011	→ Irapuato (loan)	5	(0)
2014–2015	Mineros de Zacatecas	0	(0)
2016–2017	Cafetaleros de Tapachula	18	(0)

International career
2002–2003	Mexico U-20	2	(0)
- * Club domestic league appearances and goals as of 29 April 2012

José Guadalupe Martínez Álvarez (born January 27, 1983) is a former Mexican goalkeeper for the team Estudiantes Tecos, the Mexican professional football club associated with the Universidad Autónoma de Guadalajara AC. Álvarez made his debut with the club Tecos UAG in 2002.
