= José Anastasio Torrens =

Mexican colonel

Chargé de affaires of Mexico to the United States (interim)
- In office 3 May 1823 – 18 November 1824
- Preceded by: José Manuel Zozaya
- Succeeded by: Pablo Obregón

Chargé d'affaires of Mexico to Colombia
- In office 6 September 1824 – 9 November 1829
- Preceded by: Francisco Molinos del Campo
- Succeeded by: Manuel Diez de Bonilla

Personal details
- Born: 1790 Huatusco, Veracruz
- Died: 1857 (aged 66–67) Mexico City

José Anastasio Torrens (1790 – 1857) was a Mexican colonel in the army of José María Morelos who served as chargé d'affaires of Mexico to the United States from 3 May 1823 to 18 November 1824 and as chargé d'affaires of Mexico to Colombia from 6 September 1824 to 9 November 1829.

While living in Colombia, he was accused of supporting José María Córdova's revolt against Simón Bolívar along the minister plenipotentiary and future president of the United States, William H. Harrison. As a result of his secondary participation in a plot against the Colombian President and his systematic involvement in local politics, Colombian Foreign Affairs Minister cancelled his diplomatic passport and asked him to leave the country.

== Biography ==
Torres was born on 1790 in Huatusco, Veracruz, and studied in the United States along Juan Nepomuceno Almonte, son of José María Morelos. Both were part of a group of young army officers sent by the Mexican rebel to complete their education overseas. Once Mexico and the United States established diplomatic relations, Torrens —who had developed a close relationship with José Manuel de Herrera, minister of Foreign Affairs of Emperor Agustín de Iturbide, during an 1816 trip to New Orleans— was appointed secretary in the first legation ever to represent Mexico in the United States.

The team was led by José Manuel Zozaya, whom Torrens substituted in May 1823. As chargé d'affaires of Mexico to the United States, Torrens endured economic hardships but actively reported on the United States' territorial ambitions. He was substituted the following year by Colonel Pablo Obregón, a veteran of the Army of the Three Guarantees, and transferred to South America, where he was appointed chargé d'affaires of Mexico to Colombia.

Torrens arrived to Colombia with his secretary, Colonel Ignacio Basadre —former agent of Vicente Guerrero in the Caribbean— through the port of La Guaira. They stayed for five years in the country and both sympathized with Vice President Francisco de Paula Santander but deeply distrusted South American liberator Simón Bolívar, who had been declared president-for-life with the power to select a successor by the 1828 Constitution. Torrens believed Bolívar had expansionist ambitions and antagonized with republican ideals, and that same year he was accused, along both the minister plenipotentiary and future president of the United States, William H. Harrison, and the British consul, James Herderson, of supporting a revolt organized by General José María Córdova. As a result of his secondary participation in a plot against the Colombian President, and his systematic involvement in local politics, Colombian Foreign Affairs Minister cancelled his diplomatic passport and asked him to leave the country.

Back in Mexico, Torrens was ignored for other public missions until he was appointed brigadier general in Michoacán, on 4 February 1854, and died three years later in Mexico City.
