= Manuel Garza Aldape =

Mexican attorney

Manuel Garza Aldape

Manuel Garza Aldape (April 6, 1871 – February 28, 1924) was a prominent attorney in Mexico City. From 1912 to 1913 he served as Secretary of Education, Secretary of State, and Secretary of Foreign Affairs for President Victoriano Huerta. Due to his disagreement with Huerta's policies, he was approached by an unknown individual one Sunday outside of a bullfighting arena. The individual had given him a letter written and signed by Victoriano Huerta asking him to leave Mexico in 24 hours or be killed, an event described in A Diplomat's Wife In Mexico by Edith Louise O'Shaughnessy (1916).

He lived in Paris until 1914, when he moved with his family to Maine and New York City. There, he worked for Curtis, Mallet-Prevost, Colt & Mosle until 1924, when he moved back to Mexico City.
