= Manuel Tello =

Manuel Tello may refer to:

- Manuel Tello Baurraud (1898–1971), Mexican politician and diplomat, two-time foreign secretary
- Manuel Tello Macías (1935–2010), Mexican politician and diplomat, foreign secretary and permanent representative to the UN
- Manuel Tello (footballer) (born 1984), Spanish footballer with CDA Navalcarnero
- Manuel Tello Céspedes, Peruvian politician, head of the Regional Government of Ica in 2003–2006
