= Mexico and the United Nations =

United Mexican States

United Nations membership
- Membership: Full member
- Since: November 7, 1945
- UNSC seat: Non-permanent
- Permanent Representative: Héctor Vasconcelos

Mexico is one of the 51 founding members of the United Nations and was admitted into the organization in 1945. Since then, Mexico is a full member of all the UN agencies and participates actively within the organization and has diplomatic relations with most member states.

== Mexico's role in the UN ==
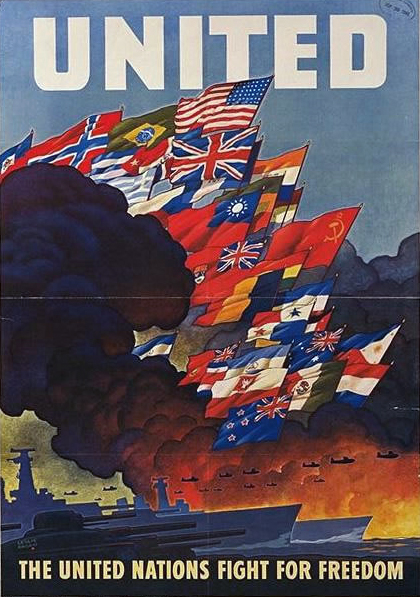
Mexico as a founding member of the United Nations.

On 26 June 1945, Mexico was represented in San Francisco by Ezequiel Padilla Peñaloza, Francisco Castillo Nájera and Manuel Tello Baurraud in the signing of the United Nations Charter. The country was formally admitted into the organization on 7 November 1945.

Since the beginning, Mexico has participated actively in the social and economic activities of the UN's various specialized agencies and other international organizations concerned with social, cultural, and economic improvement. However, due to restraints in the Mexican constitution, Mexico is prohibited from contributing troops for peacekeeping missions abroad unless Mexico has formally declared war on a country. Calls have been made from Mexican politicians to amend the constitution (mainly article 76) in order to partake in UN peacekeeping missions. This situation started to change after President Enrique Peña Nieto's address to the General Assembly on 24 September 2014, when he stated that "Mexico has taken the decision to participate in U.N. peacekeeping missions, taking part in humanitarian tasks that benefit civil society".

== Security Council ==
Mexico has been elected five times to the United Nations Security Council. The Mexican Government is vehemently opposed to adding new members to the Security Council. Mexico and eight other countries created a group called the "Uniting for Consensus" (also known as the Coffee Club), where they are opposed to new permanent members, however they would like to raise the number of more non-permanent members to 20.

List of terms as an elected member to the Security Council:

- 1946
- 1980–1981
- 2002–2003
- 2009–2010
- 2021–2022

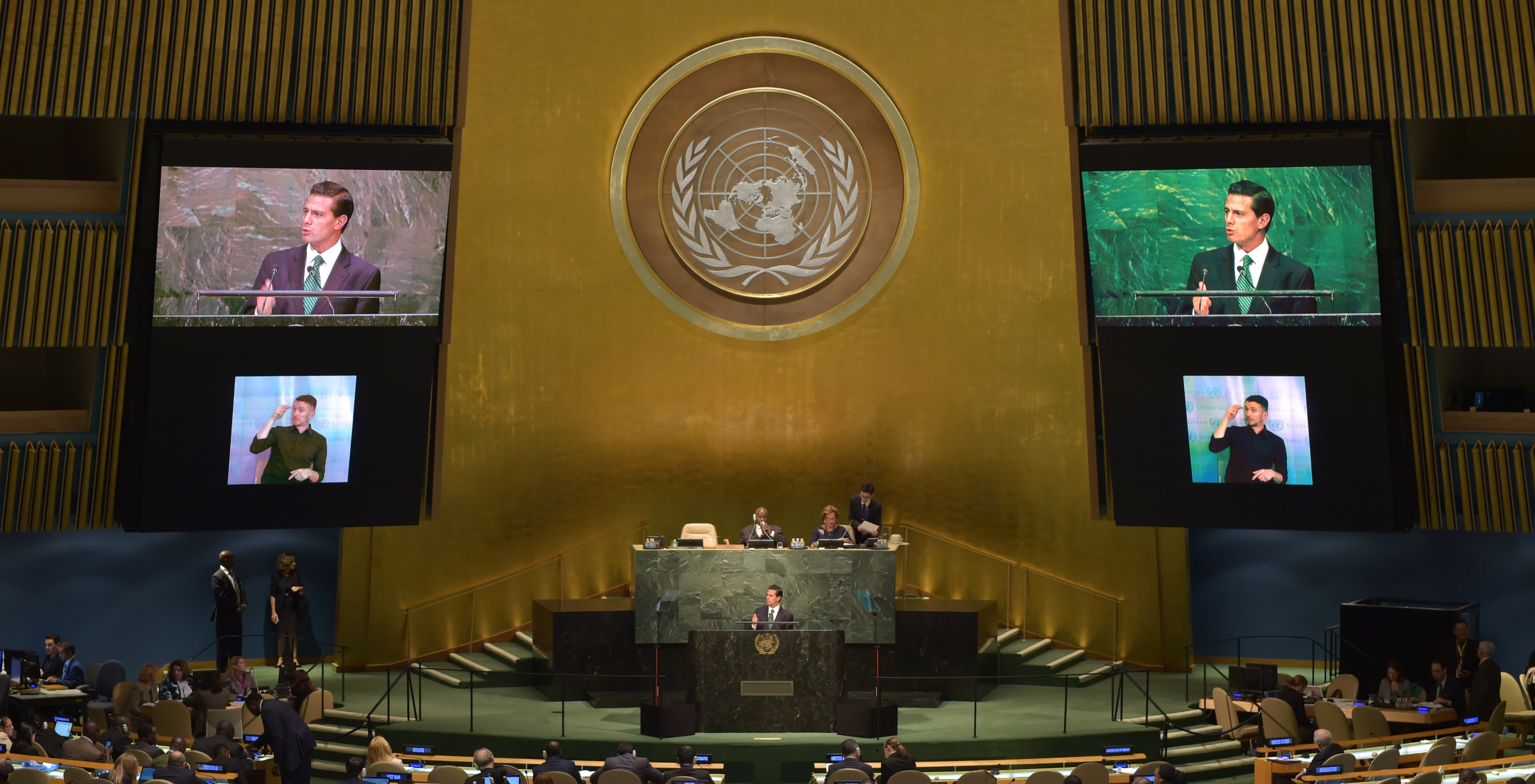
President Enrique Peña Nieto speaking at the seventieth session of the United Nations General Assembly.

== Representation ==
Mexico maintains permanent representation to the United Nations headquarters in New York City and to the other main UN agencies based in Geneva, Nairobi, Paris, Rome and Vienna.

== See also ==
- Foreign relations of Mexico
- League of Nations
- Permanent Mission of Mexico to the United Nations in Geneva
- Permanent Mission of Mexico to the United Nations in New York
- United Nations
