= List of diplomatic missions of Mexico =

Mexico's foreign service started in 1822, the year after the signing of the Treaty of Cordoba which marked the beginning of Mexico's independence. In 1831, legislation was passed that underpinned the establishment of diplomatic representations with other states in Europe and the Americas. As of 2026, Mexico has diplomatic relations with 193 countries.

Today, Mexico has a significant worldwide presence, with over 150 representations, including 53 consulates in the United States alone (no other country has as many consulates in any single host country).

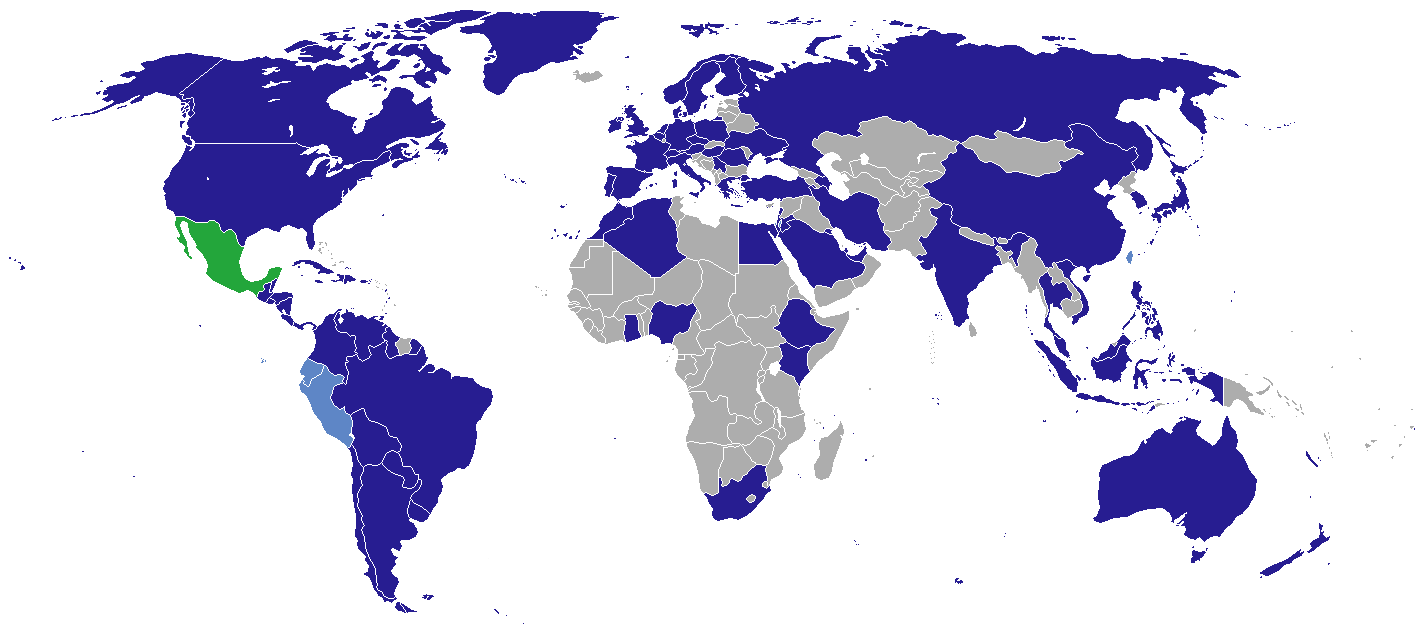
Mexican diplomatic missions

== Current missions ==
=== Africa ===
Host country	Host city	Mission	Concurrent accreditation	Image	Ref.
Algeria	Algiers	Embassy	Countries: Libya; Mauritania; Tunisia		
Egypt	Cairo	Embassy	Countries: Chad; Eritrea; Sudan		
Ethiopia	Addis Ababa	Embassy	Countries: Djibouti; Somalia; South Sudan; International Organizations: African Union (Note: Accredited as an observer mission.)		
Ghana	Accra	Embassy	Countries: Gambia; Liberia; Sierra Leone		
Kenya	Nairobi	Embassy	Countries: Burundi; Comoros; Rwanda; Seychelles; Tanzania; Uganda; International Organizations: United Nations; United Nations Environment Programme; United Nations Human Settlements Programme		
Morocco	Rabat	Embassy	Countries: Guinea-Bissau; Ivory Coast; Mali; Senegal		
Nigeria	Abuja	Embassy	Countries: Benin; Burkina Faso; Cameroon; Central African Republic; Congo-Brazzaville; Equatorial Guinea; Gabon; Guinea; Niger; Togo; International Organizations: Economic Community of West African States		
South Africa	Pretoria	Embassy	Countries: Angola; Botswana; Eswatini; Lesotho; Madagascar; Malawi; Mauritius; Mozambique; Namibia; Zambia; Zimbabwe		

=== Americas ===
Host country	Host city	Mission	Concurrent accreditation	Image	Ref.
Argentina	Buenos Aires	Embassy			
Belize	Belmopan	Embassy			
Belize	Belize City	Consular Section			
Bolivia	La Paz	Embassy			
Brazil	Brasília	Embassy			
Brazil	Rio de Janeiro	Consulate-General			
Brazil	São Paulo	Consulate-General			
Canada	Ottawa	Embassy			
Canada	Montreal	Consulate-General			
Canada	Toronto	Consulate-General			
Canada	Vancouver	Consulate-General			
Canada	Calgary	Consulate			
Canada	Leamington	Consulate			
Chile	Santiago de Chile	Embassy			
Colombia	Bogotá	Embassy			
Costa Rica	San José	Embassy			
Cuba	Havana	Embassy			
Cuba	Havana	Consulate			
Dominican Republic	Santo Domingo	Embassy			
Ecuador	Quito	Interest Section (Note: Under the protecting power of Switzerland.)			
El Salvador	San Salvador	Embassy			
Guatemala	Guatemala City	Embassy			
Guatemala	Ayutla	Consulate			
Guatemala	Flores	Consulate			
Guatemala	Quetzaltenango	Consulate			
Guyana	Georgetown	Embassy	International Organizations: Caribbean Community		
Haiti	Port-au-Prince	Embassy			
Honduras	Tegucigalpa	Embassy			
Honduras	San Pedro Sula	Consulate			
Jamaica	Kingston	Embassy	Countries: Bahamas; International Organizations: International Seabed Authority		
Nicaragua	Managua	Embassy			
Panama	Panama City	Embassy			
Paraguay	Asunción	Embassy			
Peru	Lima	Embassy			
Saint Lucia	Castries	Embassy	Countries: Antigua and Barbuda; Dominica; Grenada; Saint Kitts and Nevis; Saint Vincent and the Grenadines; International Organizations: Organisation of Eastern Caribbean States		
Trinidad and Tobago	Port of Spain	Embassy	Countries: Barbados; Suriname; International Organizations: Association of Caribbean States		
United States	Washington, D.C.	Embassy			
United States	Washington, D.C.	Consular Section			
United States	Atlanta (Georgia)	Consulate-General			
United States	Austin (Texas)	Consulate-General			
United States	Boston (Massachusetts)	Consulate-General			
United States	Chicago (Illinois)	Consulate-General			
United States	Dallas (Texas)	Consulate-General			
United States	Denver (Colorado)	Consulate-General			
United States	El Paso (Texas)	Consulate-General			
United States	Houston (Texas)	Consulate-General			
United States	Laredo (Texas)	Consulate-General			
United States	Los Angeles (California)	Consulate General			
United States	Miami (Florida)	Consulate-General			
United States	New York City (New York)	Consulate-General			
United States	Nogales (Arizona)	Consulate-General			
United States	Phoenix (Arizona)	Consulate-General			
United States	Raleigh (North Carolina)	Consulate-General			
United States	Sacramento (California)	Consulate-General			
United States	San Antonio (Texas)	Consulate-General			
United States	San Diego (California)	Consulate-General			
United States	San Francisco (California)	Consulate-General			
United States	San Jose (California)	Consulate-General			
United States	San Juan (Puerto Rico)	Consulate-General			
United States	Albuquerque (New Mexico)	Consulate			
United States	Boise (Idaho)	Consulate			
United States	Brownsville (Texas)	Consulate			
United States	Calexico (California)	Consulate			
United States	Del Rio (Texas)	Consulate			
United States	Detroit (Michigan)	Consulate			
United States	Douglas (Arizona)	Consulate			
United States	Eagle Pass (Texas)	Consulate			
United States	Fresno (California)	Consulate			
United States	Indianapolis (Indiana)	Consulate			
United States	Kansas City (Missouri)	Consulate			
United States	Las Vegas (Nevada)	Consulate			
United States	Little Rock (Arkansas)	Consulate			
United States	McAllen (Texas)	Consulate			
United States	Milwaukee (Wisconsin)	Consulate			
United States	New Brunswick (New Jersey)	Consulate			
United States	New Orleans (Louisiana)	Consulate			
United States	Oklahoma City (Oklahoma)	Consulate			
United States	Omaha (Nebraska)	Consulate			
United States	Orlando (Florida)	Consulate			
United States	Oxnard (California)	Consulate			
United States	Philadelphia (Pennsylvania)	Consulate			
United States	Portland (Oregon)	Consulate			
United States	Presidio (Texas)	Consulate			
United States	Saint Paul (Minnesota)	Consulate			
United States	Salt Lake City (Utah)	Consulate			
United States	San Bernardino (California)	Consulate			
United States	Santa Ana (California)	Consulate			
United States	Seattle (Washington)	Consulate			
United States	Tucson (Arizona)	Consulate			
United States	Yuma (Arizona)	Consulate			
Uruguay	Montevideo	Embassy	International Organizations: ALADI; Mercosur		
Venezuela	Caracas	Embassy	Constituent countries: Aruba; Curaçao		

=== Asia ===
Host country	Host city	Mission	Concurrent accreditation	Image	Ref.
Azerbaijan	Baku	Embassy			
China	Beijing	Embassy			
China	Chongqing	Consulate			
China	Guangzhou	Consulate-General			
China	Hong Kong	Consulate-General			
China	Shanghai	Consulate-General			
India	New Delhi	Embassy	Countries: Bangladesh; Maldives; Nepal; Sri Lanka		
India	Mumbai	Consulate			
Indonesia	Jakarta	Embassy	Countries: East Timor; International Organizations: Association of Southeast Asian Nations		
Iran	Tehran	Embassy	Countries: Afghanistan; Kyrgyzstan; Pakistan; Tajikistan; Uzbekistan		
Israel	Tel Aviv	Embassy			
Japan	Tokyo	Embassy			
Jordan	Amman	Embassy			
Kuwait	Kuwait City	Embassy			
Lebanon	Beirut	Embassy	Countries: Syria		
Malaysia	Kuala Lumpur	Embassy	Countries: Kiribati; Nauru		
Palestine	Ramallah	Representative Office			
Philippines	Manila	Embassy	Countries: Marshall Islands; Micronesia; Palau		
Qatar	Doha	Embassy			
Saudi Arabia	Riyadh	Embassy	Countries: Bahrain; Oman; Yemen		
Singapore	Singapore	Embassy	Countries: Brunei; Myanmar		
South Korea	Seoul	Embassy	Countries: Mongolia; North Korea		
Republic of China (Taiwan)	Taipei	Trade Services Documentation & Cultural Office			
Thailand	Bangkok	Embassy	Countries: Cambodia		
Turkey	Ankara	Embassy	Countries: Georgia; Kazakhstan; Turkmenistan		
Turkey	Istanbul	Consulate	Countries: Georgia; Kazakhstan; Turkmenistan		
United Arab Emirates	Abu Dhabi	Embassy	Countries: Iraq		
Vietnam	Hanoi	Embassy	Countries: Laos		

=== Europe ===
Host country	Host city	Mission	Concurrent accreditation	Image	Ref.
Austria	Vienna	Embassy	Countries: Slovakia; Slovenia; International Organizations: United Nations; International Atomic Energy Agency; United Nations Industrial Development Organization; United Nations Office on Drugs and Crime; UNCITRAL		
Belgium	Brussels	Embassy	Countries: Luxembourg; International Organizations: European Union		
Czech Republic	Prague	Embassy			
Denmark	Copenhagen	Embassy	Countries: Iceland		
Finland	Helsinki	Embassy	Countries: Estonia		
France	Paris	Embassy	Countries: Monaco		
France	Paris	Consular Section	Countries: Monaco		
Germany	Berlin	Embassy			
Germany	Frankfurt	Consulate			
Greece	Athens	Embassy	Countries: Cyprus		
Holy See (Note: The Mexican Embassy to the Holy See is located outside Vatican territory in Rome.)	Rome	Embassy			
Hungary	Budapest	Embassy	Countries: Bulgaria; Croatia		
Ireland	Dublin	Embassy			
Italy	Rome	Embassy	Countries: Albania; Malta; San Marino		
Italy	Milan	Consulate-General	Countries: Albania; Malta; San Marino		
Netherlands	The Hague	Embassy	International Organizations: Organisation for the Prohibition of Chemical Weapons		
Norway	Oslo	Embassy			
Poland	Warsaw	Embassy			
Portugal	Lisbon	Embassy			
Romania	Bucharest	Embassy	Countries: Moldova		
Russia	Moscow	Embassy	Countries: Armenia; Belarus		
Serbia	Belgrade	Embassy	Countries: Bosnia and Herzegovina; Montenegro; North Macedonia		
Spain	Madrid	Embassy	Countries: Andorra		
Spain	Barcelona	Consulate	Countries: Andorra		
Sweden	Stockholm	Embassy	Countries: Latvia; Lithuania		
Switzerland	Bern	Embassy	Countries: Liechtenstein		
Ukraine	Kyiv	Embassy			
United Kingdom	London	Embassy	International Organizations: International Maritime Organization; International Coffee Organization; International Sugar Organization; International Whaling Commission		

=== Oceania ===
Host country	Host city	Mission	Concurrent accreditation	Image	Ref.
Australia	Canberra	Embassy	Countries: Fiji; Papua New Guinea; Solomon Islands; Vanuatu		
New Zealand	Wellington	Embassy	Countries: Samoa; Tonga; Tuvalu		

=== Multilateral organizations ===
Organization	Host city	Host country	Mission	Concurrent accreditation	Image	Ref.
Agency for the Prohibition of Nuclear Weapons in Latin America and the Caribbean (OPANAL)	Mexico City	Mexico	Permanent Mission			
Council of Europe	Strasbourg	France	Liaison Office (Note: Accredited as a permanent observer mission.)			
Food and Agriculture Organization	Rome	Italy	Permanent Mission	International Organizations: International Fund for Agricultural Development; World Food Programme		
ICAO	Montreal	Canada	Permanent Mission			
OECD	Paris	France	Permanent Mission			
Organization of American States	Washington, D.C.	United States	Permanent Mission			
United Nations	Geneva	Switzerland	Permanent Mission			
United Nations	New York City	United States	Permanent Mission	Countries: Cape Verde; Congo-Kinshasa; Sahrawi Republic; São Tomé and Príncipe		
UNESCO	Paris	France	Permanent Mission			

== Closed missions ==
=== Africa ===
Host country	Host city	Mission	Year closed	Ref.
Angola	Luanda	Embassy	2009	
Namibia	Windhoek	Embassy	2002	
Senegal	Dakar	Embassy	1991	
Tanzania	Dar es Salaam	Embassy	1980	
Zimbabwe	Harare	Embassy	1994	

=== Americas ===
Host country	Host city	Mission	Year closed	Ref.
Brazil	Porto Alegre	Consulate-General	2009	
Ecuador	Quito	Embassy (Note: Continues as an interest section.)	2024	
Ecuador	Guayaquil	Consulate-General	2009	
Guatemala	Malacatán	Consulate	1982	
United States	Anchorage	Consulate	2015	
United States	Corpus Christi	Consulate	2002	
United States	Midland	Consulate	2002	

=== Asia ===
Host country	Host city	Mission	Year closed	Ref.
Iraq	Baghdad	Embassy	1986	
Japan	Osaka	Consulate-General	2001	
Empire of Japan	Yokohama	Consulate	1941	
Pakistan	Islamabad	Embassy	2009	
United Arab Emirates	Dubai	Consulate-General	2011	

=== Europe ===
Host country	Host city	Mission	Year closed	Ref.
People's Socialist Republic of Albania	Tirana	Embassy	1979	
People's Republic of Bulgaria	Sofia	Embassy	1989	
French State	Marseille	Consulate-General	1942	

=== Oceania ===
Host country	Host city	Mission	Year closed	Ref.
Australia	Sydney	Consulate-General	2001	

== See also ==
- Foreign relations of Mexico
- List of diplomatic missions in Mexico
- Visa policy of Mexico
