= Permanent Mission of Mexico to the United Nations in Geneva =

Permanent Mission of Mexico to the United Nations and other International Organizations based in Switzerland
- Misión Permanente de México ante la ONU y otros Organismos Internacionales con sede en Suiza

- Incumbent; Socorro Flores Liera since 1 November 2017
- Style: Excellency
- Type: Diplomatic mission
- Status: Active
- Reports to: Secretariat of Foreign Affairs
- Seat: Geneva, Switzerland
- Appointer: President of Mexico with Senate advice and consent
- Formation: 1950; 76 years ago
- First holder: Emilio Calderón Puig
- Website: mision.sre.gob.mx/oi

The Permanent Mission of Mexico to the United Nations and other International Organizations based in Switzerland is a diplomatic mission of Mexico to the United Nations, and other international organizations, based in Geneva.

== Location ==
The Permanent Mission is located on the fifth floor of 15 Chemin Louis-Dunant. Other missions to the United Nations in Geneva located in the building include those of Lithuania, Namibia, Ecuador and Brazil.

== Role ==
Similar to its Mission in New York, the Mission in Geneva has similar functions, including:

- Collaborating in the formulation of strategies that govern Mexico's actions before the United Nations and its subsidiary bodies
- Participating in all meeting convened by United Nations bodies, as well as specialized agencies, keeping in mind Mexican national interests
  - This includes negotiating international treaties and agreements that are of interest to Mexico
- Carrying out necessary actions to promote the initiatives of Mexico before the United Nations and it subsidiary bodies, as well as other international organizations
- Promoting candidacies that are of interest to Mexico within the framework of the United Nations
- Participating in the mechanisms of establishing quotas, as well as allocation of the budget of the United Nations
- Accrediting the actions of Mexican delegates participating in United Nations meetings

== Organizations represented ==
The Permanent Mission represents Mexico, and its interests, in the following organizations:

- Economic affairs:
  - United Nations Conference on Trade and Development
  - International Trade Center
  - World Economic Forum
  - Universal Postal Union
- Financial affairs:
  - Geneva Group
- Migratory and humanitarian affairs:
  - International Organization for Migration
  - Office of the United Nations High Commissioner for Refugees
  - International Committee of the Red Cross
- Human rights:
  - Office of the United Nations High Commissioner for Human Rights
- Disarmament:
  - Conference on Disarmament
- Disaster relief:
  - United Nations Office for the Coordination of Humanitarian Affairs
  - International Federation of the Red Cross
  - United Nations International Strategy for Disaster Reduction
  - Global Fund for Disaster Reduction and Recovery
- The environment:
  - World Meteorological Organization
  - Geneva Environment Network
  - Intergovernmental Panel on Climate Change
  - Group on Earth Observations
- Intellectual property:
  - World Intellectual Property Organization
  - International Union for the Protection of New Varieties of Plants
- Telecommunications:
  - International Telecommunication Union
- Health:
  - World Health Organization
  - Joint United Nations Program on HIV/AIDS
  - The Global Fund to Fight AIDS, Tuberculosis and Malaria
- Work:
  - International Labour Organization

== Permanent representatives of Mexico to the United Nations in Geneva ==
Below is a list of the permanent representatives of Mexico at the United Nations in Geneva since its creation:

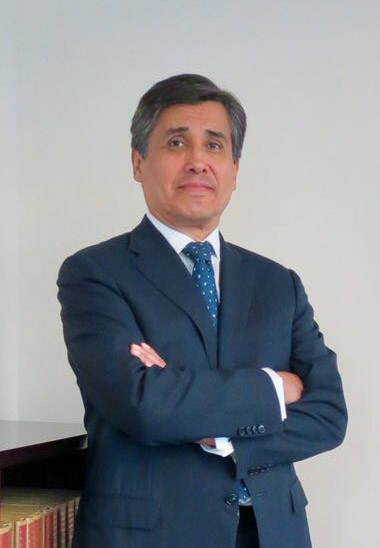
Juan José Gómez Camacho

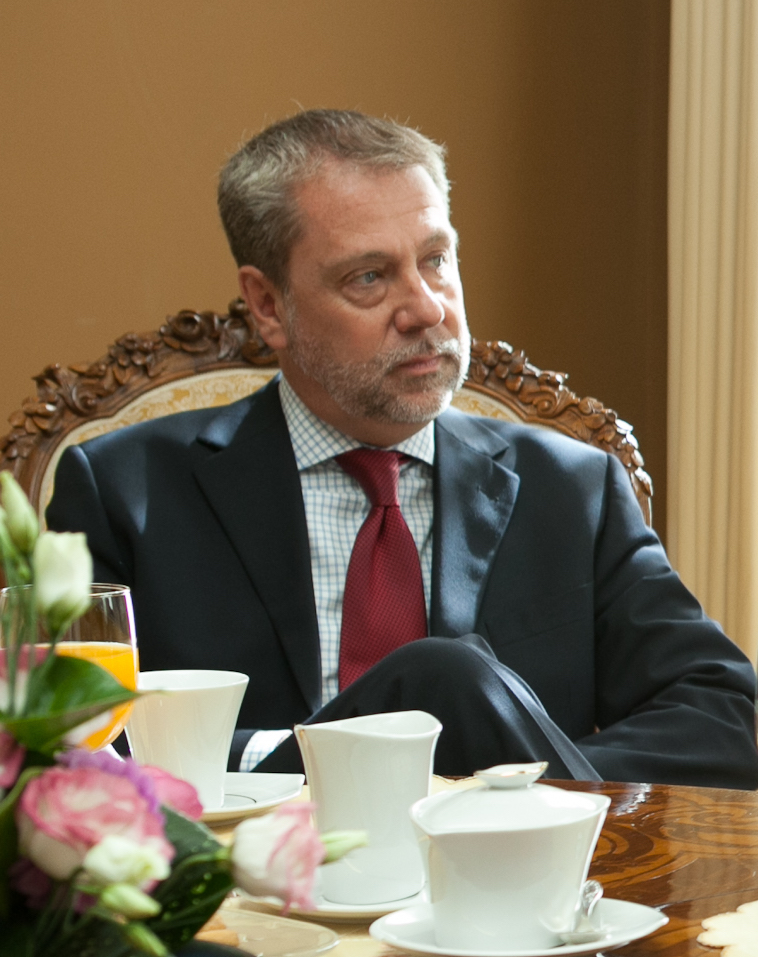
Jorge Lomónaco Tonda

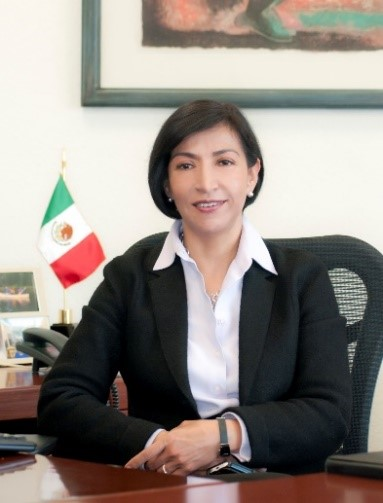
María del Socorro Flores Liera

- Under President Miguel Alemán Valdés
  - 1950 – 1953: Pedro de Alba Pérez
- Under President Adolfo Ruiz Cortines
  - 1952 – 1953: Pedro de Alba Pérez
  - 1953 – 1953: Octavio Irineo Paz y Lozano
  - 1953 – 1957: Emilio Calderón Puig
  - 1957 – 1958: Pedro de Alba Pérez
- Under President Adolfo López Mateos
  - 1958 – 1961: Pedro de Alba Pérez
  - 1961 – 1964: Emilio Calderón Puig
- Under President Gustavo Díaz Ordaz
  - 1964 – 1966: Antonio Gómez Robledo
  - 1966 – 1969: Ernesto de Santiago López
  - 1969 – 1970: Juan Gallardo Moreno
- Under President Luis Echeverría
  - 1970 – 1971: Juan Gallardo Moreno
  - 1971 – 1976: Jorge Castañeda y Álvarez de la Rosa
- Under President José López Portillo
  - 1976 – 1977: Manuel Armendáriz Etchegaray
  - 1977 – 1978: Antonio González de León Quintanilla
  - 1978 – 1979: Roberto Martínez Le Clainche
  - 1979 – 1982: Plácido García Reynoso
- Under President Miguel de la Madrid
  - 1982 – 1983: Andrés Rozental Gutman
  - 1983 – 1988: Manuel Tello Macías
- Under President Carlos Salinas de Gortari
  - 1988 – 1989: Manuel Tello Macías
  - 1989 – 1994: Miguel Marín Bosch
- Under President Ernesto Zedillo
  - 1994 – 1995: Miguel Marín Bosch
  - 1995 – 2000: Eusebio Antonio de Icaza González
- Under President Vicente Fox
  - 2000 – 2001: Eusebio Antonio de Icaza González
  - 2001 – 2004: Gustavo Albín Santos
  - 2004 – 2006: Luis Alfonso de Alba Góngora
- Under President Felipe Calderón
  - 2006 – 2009: Luis Alfonso de Alba Góngora
  - 2009 – 2012: Juan José Gómez Camacho
- Under President Enrique Peña Nieto
  - 2012 – 2013: Juan José Gómez Camacho
  - 2013 – 2017: Jorge Lomónaco Tonda
- Under President Andrés Manuel López Obrador
  - 2017 – 2021: María del Socorro Flores Liera
  - 2022 – Present: Francisca Elizabeth Méndez Escobar

== Other Mexican representation in the United Nations system ==
To the UN offices:

- Permanent Representative of Mexico to the United Nations in New York
- Permanent Representative of Mexico to the United Nations Office and International Organizations in Vienna (assumed by its Austrian Embassy)

To the other United Nations organs:

- Permanent Mission of Mexico to the International Civil Aviation Organization
- Permanent Mission of Mexico to the United Nations Offices in Rome
- Permanent Mission of Mexico to the United Nations Educational, Scientific and Cultural Organization

== See also ==
- Foreign relations of Mexico
- Permanent Mission of Mexico to the United Nations in New York
- Mexico and the United Nations
