= Encina =

Encina may refer to:

== People ==
- Juan del Encina (1468–1529 or 1530), Spanish composer, poet and playwright
- Francisco Encina (born 1943), Chilean politician
- Francisco Antonio Encina (1874–1965), Chilean politician, businessman, political essayist, historian and white nationalist
- Guillermo Encina (born 1951), Chilean golfer
- Hernán Encina (born 1982), Argentine footballer
- Paz Encina (born 1971), Paraguayan director and screenwriter

== Places ==
- La Encina, Castile and León, Spain, a municipality
- Encina, Oregon, United States, an unincorporated community
- Encina, original name of Uvalde, Texas, United States

== Other uses ==
- Encina High School, Sacramento, California, United States
- Encina Power Station, a former electricity generating station in Carlsbad, California
- Encina (software), a transaction processing system

== See also ==
- Daniel Puente Encina (born 1965), Chilean singer, songwriter, guitarist, film composer, producer and actor
- Rodrigo Ruiz Encina (born 1967), Chilean anthropologist
- Encina Tres Patas de Mendaza, a very old oak tree in Spain
- Encinas, a municipality in Spain
- Encinas (surname), a list of people
