= Carlos Tello Macías =

Mexican economist, academic and diplomat (1938–2024)

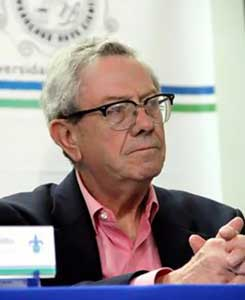

Secretary of Budget and Planning
- In office 1 December 1976 – 16 November 1977
- President: José López Portillo

Personal details
- Born: Carlos Tello Macías; 4 November 1938 Geneva, Switzerland
- Died: 30 July 2024 (aged 85)
- Party: Institutional Revolutionary Party
- Spouse: Catalina Díaz Casasús
- Children: 3
- Education: Georgetown University; Columbia University; King's College, Cambridge
- Profession: Economist

Carlos Alejandro Tello Macías (Note: In this Mexican name, the surname is Tello and the second or maternal family name is Macías.) (4 November 1938 – 30 July 2024) was a Mexican socialist-oriented economist, academic, and diplomat. He was an ambassador to Cuba and the Soviet Union, the director-general of the central bank (1982), and the Secretary of Budget and Planning (1976–77) in the cabinet of President José López Portillo. According to a document distributed in the Senate by his political rivals (including some members of his own party), he was responsible for the high inflation rate (which surpassed 100 percent) and the significant increase of the external debt (which grew from USD 8.6 billion to 92.4 billion) during López Portillo's administration.

== Biography ==
Tello Macías was born in Geneva, Switzerland, where his parents, Manuel Tello Baurraud and Guadalupe Macías Viadero, were serving as Mexican diplomats. He received a bachelor's degree in Business Administration from Georgetown University (1955–58), a master's degree in Economics from Columbia University (1958–59) and a doctorate in the same discipline from King's College, University of Cambridge (1961–63).

Tello joined the Institutional Revolutionary Party (PRI) in 1976. In 1975–76 he was an undersecretary at the Secretariat of Finance and Public Credit (SHCP). In 1976, President López Portillo appointed him to head the newly created Secretariat of Budget and Planning; he remained in that position until he was forced to resign following a long and bitter dispute with the Secretary of Finance, Julio Rodolfo Moctezuma. In September 1982, López Portillo appointed him director-general of the Bank of Mexico, where he played a key role in the controversial nationalization of the country's banking system announced by the president in the final months of his term. He was replaced at the central bank in November 1982 by Miguel Mancera Aguayo, who opposed his foreign exchange controls strategy.

In 1990, President Carlos Salinas de Gortari appointed him ambassador to the Soviet Union, where he served until 1992. In 1994 he was named ambassador to Cuba. In the latter part of the 1990s, President Ernesto Zedillo selected him to head the National Indigenist Institute (INI).

As an academic, he read several courses at the National Autonomous University of Mexico (UNAM) (1960–87), at El Colegio de México (1964–79), at the United Nations Economic Commission for Latin America and the Caribbean (ECLAC) and worked as a researcher for over nine years at the National Institute of Anthropology and History (INAH) (1978–87). He also worked as a guest scholar at the Woodrow Wilson International Center for Scholars at Washington, D.C. (1984) and as a visiting researcher at the Center for Mexican–United States Studies at the University of California, San Diego (1984–85). In 2016, the UNAM named him Professor Emeritus for "his exceptional teaching over more than 30 years and his notable work as a researcher in the field of economics".

== Personal life ==
Tello Macías was the son of Manuel Tello Baurraud (1898–1971), who was twice secretary of foreign affairs. His brother, Manuel Tello Macías, also served as foreign secretary.

Tello Macías was married to Catalina Díaz Casasús, a descendant of President Porfirio Díaz. He had three children, among them, historian Carlos Tello Díaz, author of La rebelión de las cañadas.

Tello Macías died on 30 July 2024, at the age of 85.

== Selected works ==
Tello Macías published more than 20 books, including:

- Cartas desde Moscú ("Letters from Moscow", 1994)
- Estado y desarrollo económico: México 1920–2006 ("State and Economic Development: Mexico 1920–2006", 2008)
- La Nacionalización de la Banca en México ("The Nationalization of the Mexican Banking System", 1984) ISBN 9789682315695
