= Emerge85 =

emerge85
- Formation: 2016
- Type: Joint Research Initiative
- Location: Washington, D.C. and Abu Dhabi
- Co-Directors: Afshin Molavi and Mishaal Al Gergawi
- Website: http://emerge85.io/

Emerge85, originally known as The Johns Hopkins SAIS-Delma Institute Partnership on Geo-Economic Multiplicity, is a research partnership between the Foreign Policy Institute at Johns Hopkins Paul H. Nitze School of Advanced International Studies (SAIS) and the UAE-based Delma Institute. The partnership is co-located in Washington, D.C., and Abu Dhabi.

Its stated purpose is to explore change and the rising importance of emerging markets, with emphasis on stories that challenge the economic status quo and reshape the global landscape. Recurring themes include urbanization, increased connectivity, and the global middle class.

The partnership derives its name from the 85% of the world's population living in Asia, Africa, and Latin America.

== History ==
emerge85 was founded in April 2016 and launched to the public at an event hosted by Vali Nasr, the dean of SAIS, on October 4, 2016. A year later in October 2017, emerge85 was an official partner at the fourth ALN Annual International Conference in Dubai, which explored economic opportunities between Africa and the Persian Gulf region. It also partnered with The Milken Institute for its 2018 MENA Summit in Abu Dhabi in February 2018, where Al Gergawi moderated a panel discussion on food security in the Middle East, and spoke on another panel about China's One Belt One Road Initiative.

== Leadership ==
emerge85 is co-directed by Afshin Molavi and Mishaal Al Gergawi. Molavi is an author and senior fellow at Johns Hopkins SAIS and the New America Foundation. Al Gergawi is the managing director of The Delma Institute, a risk advisory firm located in Abu Dhabi. Both Molavi and Al Gergawi regularly comment on emerging market affairs, appearing in the US media for The Atlantic, Foreign Policy, The Hill, Politico, and others.

== Publications ==
The partnership regularly publishes original articles and podcasts on its website. In October 2017, emerge85 published two reports, the first discussing how to bridge the Persian Gulf and Africa, and the second, looking at the energy ramifications of China's One Belt One Road Initiative.

=== Podcast ===
emerge85's podcast, "The 85%", was launched on August 7, 2017. The fortnightly show is hosted by Afshin Molavi.
