= Permanent Mission of Mexico to the Organization of American States =

Diplomatic mission

Coordinates: 38°54′51.2″N 77°3′14.9″W

- Misión Permanente de México ante la Organización de los Estados Americanos

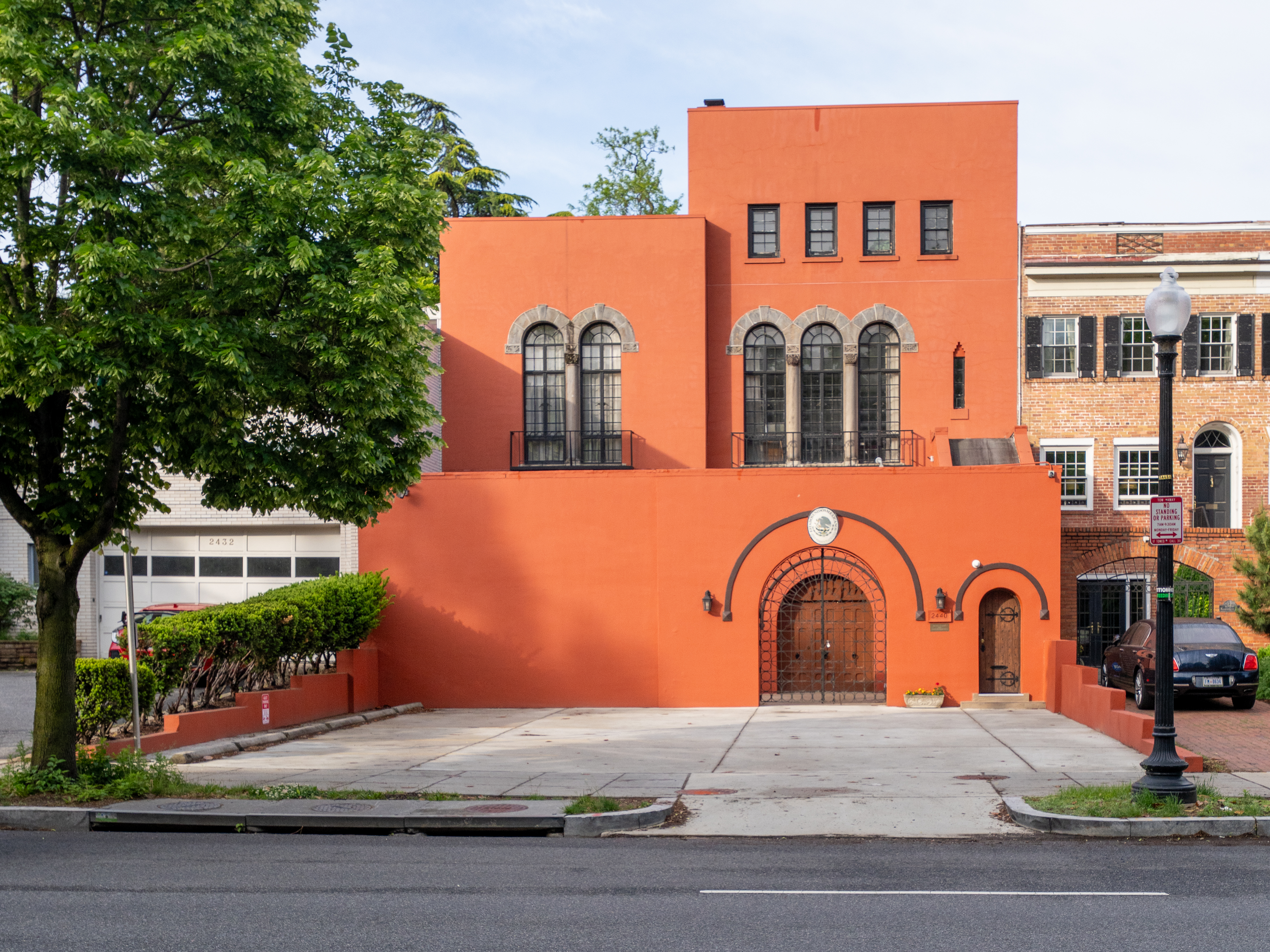
- Incumbent; Alejandro Encinas Rodríguez since 17 December 2025
- Style: Excellency
- Type: Diplomatic mission
- Status: Active
- Appointer: President of Mexico with Senate advice and consent
- Formation: 1948
- First holder: Luis Quintanilla del Valle
- Website: mision.sre.gob.mx/oea

The Permanent Mission of Mexico to the Organization of American States is the diplomatic mission of Mexico to the Organization of American States in Washington D.C., United States.

== Location ==
The Permanent Mission is located on Embassy Row in Washington, D.C., in the old Charles Mason Remey House.

== Permanent Representatives of Mexico to the Organization of American States ==
Below is a list of the permanent representatives of Mexico at the OAS since its creation:

Term	Representative	President(s)
1948–1959	Luis Quintanilla del Valle	Miguel Alemán Valdés; Adolfo Ruiz Cortines; Adolfo López Mateos
1959–1965	Vicente Sánchez Gavito	Adolfo López Mateos; Gustavo Díaz Ordaz
1965–1986	Rafael de la Colina Riquelme	Gustavo Díaz Ordaz; Luis Echeverría; José López Portillo; Miguel de la Madrid
1986–1991	Eusebio Antonio de Icaza González	Miguel de la Madrid; Carlos Salinas de Gortari
1991–1992	Santiago Oñate Laborde	Carlos Salinas de Gortari
1992–1994	Alejandro Carrillo Castro	Carlos Salinas de Gortari; Ernesto Zedillo
1995–1998	Carmen Moreno Toscano	Ernesto Zedillo
1998–2001	Claude Heller Rouassant	Ernesto Zedillo
2001–2004	Miguel Ruiz-Cabañas Izquierdo	Vicente Fox
2004–2005	Jorge Eduardo Chen Charpentier	Vicente Fox
2006–2007	Alejandro García-Moreno Elizondo	Vicente Fox; Felipe Calderón
2007–2011	Gustavo Albín Santos	Felipe Calderón
2011–2013	Joel Antonio Hernández García	Felipe Calderón; Enrique Peña Nieto
2013–2016	Emilio Rabasa P. Gamboa	Enrique Peña Nieto
2016–2017	Alfonso de Alba Góngora	Enrique Peña Nieto
2017–2019	Jorge Lomónaco Tonda	Enrique Peña Nieto; Andrés Manuel López Obrador
2019–2025	Luz Elena Baños Rivas	Andrés Manuel López Obrador; Claudia Sheinbaum
2025–	Alejandro Encinas Rodríguez	Claudia Sheinbaum

== See also ==
- List of diplomatic missions of Mexico
- Secretariat of Foreign Affairs
