= Permanent Mission of Mexico to the United Nations =

Diplomatic mission

- Misión Permanente de México ante las Naciones Unidas

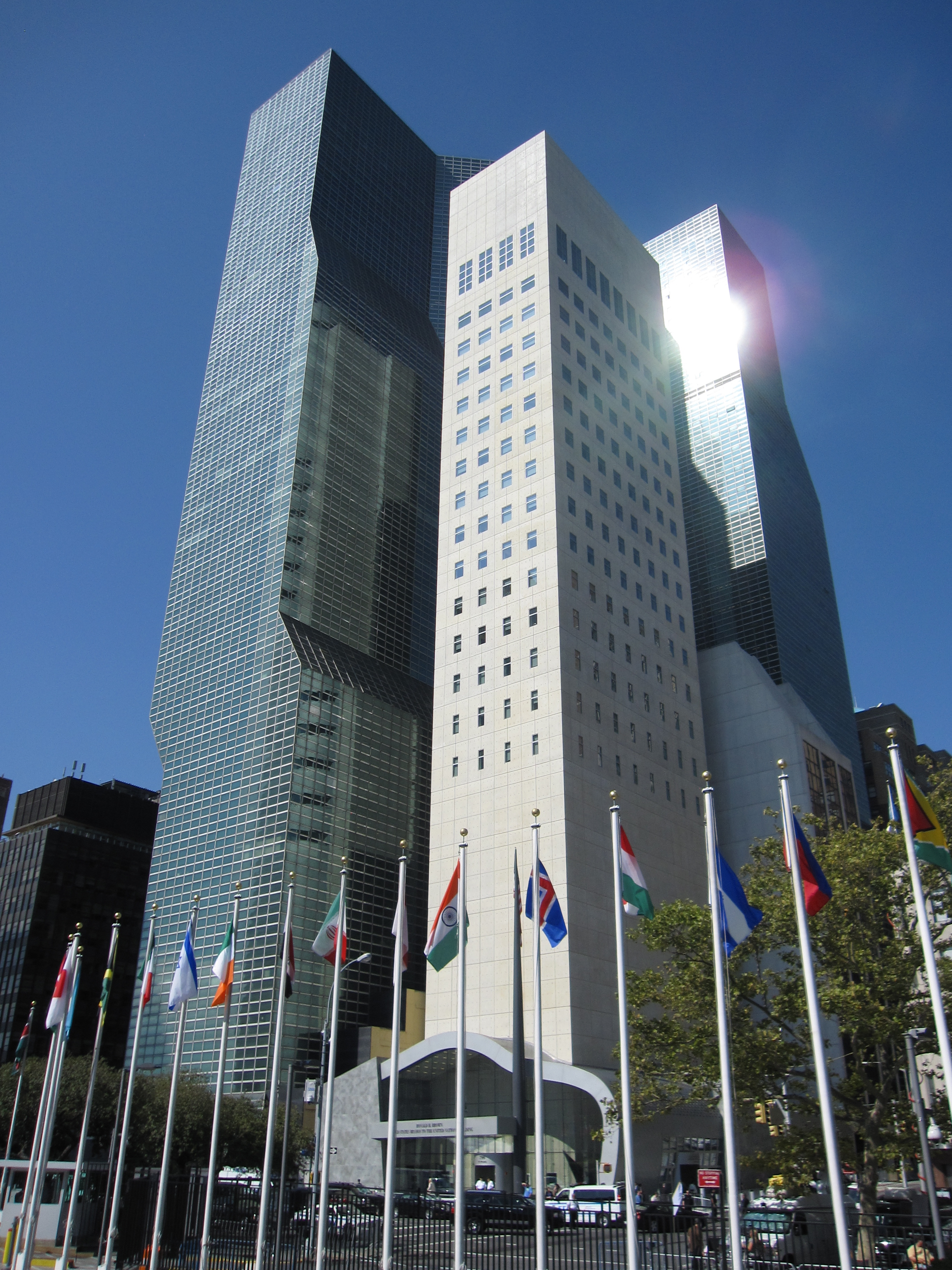
- Incumbent; Héctor Vasconcelos since 30 January 2024
- Style: Excellency
- Type: Diplomatic mission
- Status: Active
- Appointer: President of Mexico; with Senate advice and consent
- Formation: 1945
- First holder: Luis Padilla Nervo
- Website: mision.sre.gob.mx/onu

The Permanent Mission of Mexico to the United Nations is the diplomatic mission of Mexico to the United Nations in New York. The Mission is represented by the Permanent Representative. As of 2024, the Mexican Permanent Representative to the United Nations is Héctor Vasconcelos.

== Location ==
The Permanent Mission is located on the 28th floor of 2 United Nations Plaza in Manhattan, New York, across the street from United Nations Headquarters. This building was constructed by the United Nations Development Corporation, and is mainly occupied by the United Nations and its subsidiary bodies, as well as by foreign missions to the organization.

== History ==
Mexico was one of the original members of the United Nations, having been present at the United Nations Conference on International Organization. It officially became a member of the United Nations on November 7, 1945.

The first Permanent Representative of Mexico at the United Nations was Luis Padilla Nervo, who would later serve as President of the General Assembly for its sixth session, as well as represent Mexico on the Security Council.

Since joining the organization, Mexico has been one of its biggest proponents. It has repeatedly stressed that the United Nations should be the highest multilateral forum for seeking collective solutions to global problems, as well as providing the best framework for agreeing upon common strategies. Additionally, Mexico has participated in all major United Nations bodies since 1946, and has been ranked among the world's biggest contributors to the United Nations budget. In 2018, it contributed $34.8 million to the regular budget.

In its history at the United Nations, Mexico has sat on the Security Council five times, and on the Economic and Social Council 14 times. It has also presided over the Security Council seven times as President of the Security Council, and once over the General Assembly as President of the General Assembly. Mexican delegates have also served as Vice-president of the General Assembly a total of seven times.

== Role ==
The main role of the Mission is to act as the intermediary between the United Nations, and the current Mexican administration. Additionally, some of its principle functions include:

- Collaborating in the formulation of strategies that govern Mexico's actions before the United Nations and its subsidiary bodies
- Participating in all meeting convened by United Nations bodies, as well as specialized agencies, keeping in mind Mexican national interests
  - This includes negotiating international treaties and agreements that are of interest to Mexico
- Carrying out necessary actions to promote the initiatives of Mexico before the United Nations and it subsidiary bodies, as well as other international organizations
- Promoting candidacies that are of interest to Mexico within the framework of the United Nations
- Participating in the mechanisms of establishing quotas, as well as allocation of the budget of the United Nations
- Accrediting the actions of Mexican delegates participating in United Nations meetings

== Mexico's priorities ==
The following are Mexico's priorities within the United Nations system:

- Disarmament
- International peace and security
- Sustainable peace
- Peacekeeping missions and their operations
- Fighting crime
- Human rights
- Protecting minorities and vulnerable groups
- Sustainable development
- Economic and social development
- International rights

== Permanent Representatives of Mexico to the United Nations ==
Below is a list of the permanent representatives of Mexico at the United Nations since its creation:

Term	Representative	President
1945–1952	Luis Padilla Nervo	Miguel Alemán Valdés
1952–1953	Martin Luis Guzmán (interim)	Adolfo Ruiz Cortines
1953–1959	Rafael de la Colina	Adolfo Ruiz Cortines
1959–1963	Luis Padilla Nervo	Adolfo López Mateos
1963–1965	Jorge Castañeda y Álvarez de la Rosa (interim)	Adolfo López Mateos
1965–1970	Francisco Cuevas Cancino	Gustavo Diaz Ordaz
1970–1975	Alfonso García Robles	Luis Echeverria Álvarez
1976–1978	Roberto de Rosenzweig-Díaz Azmitia	José López Portillo
1978–1979	Francisco Cuevas Cancino (interim)	José López Portillo
1979–85	Porfirio Muñoz Ledo	José López Portillo / Miguel de la Madrid
1985–1989	Mario Moya Palencia	Miguel de la Madrid
1989–1993	Jorge Montaño	Carlos Salinas de Gortari
1993–1994	Manuel Tello Macías	Carlos Salinas de Gortari
1994–1995	Víctor Flores Olea	Ernesto Zedillo Ponce de León
1995–2001	Manuel Tello Macías	Ernesto Zedillo Ponce de León
2001–2002	Jorge Eduardo Navarrete	Vicente Fox Quesada
2002–2003	Adolfo Aguilar Zínser	Vicente Fox Quesada
2003–2006	Enrique Berruga Filloy	Vicente Fox Quesada
2007–2011	Claude Heller Rouassant	Felipe Calderón Hinojosa
2011–2013	Luis Alfonso de Alba Góngora	Felipe Calderón Hinojosa
2013–2016	Jorge Montaño	Enrique Peña Nieto
2016–2019	Juan José Gómez Camacho	Enrique Peña Nieto / Andrés Manuel López Obrador
2019–2023	Juan Ramón de la Fuente	Andrés Manuel López Obrador
2023	Alicia Buenrostro Massieu	Andrés Manuel López Obrador
2024–present	Héctor Vasconcelos	Andrés Manuel López Obrador; Claudia Sheinbaum

== Gallery ==
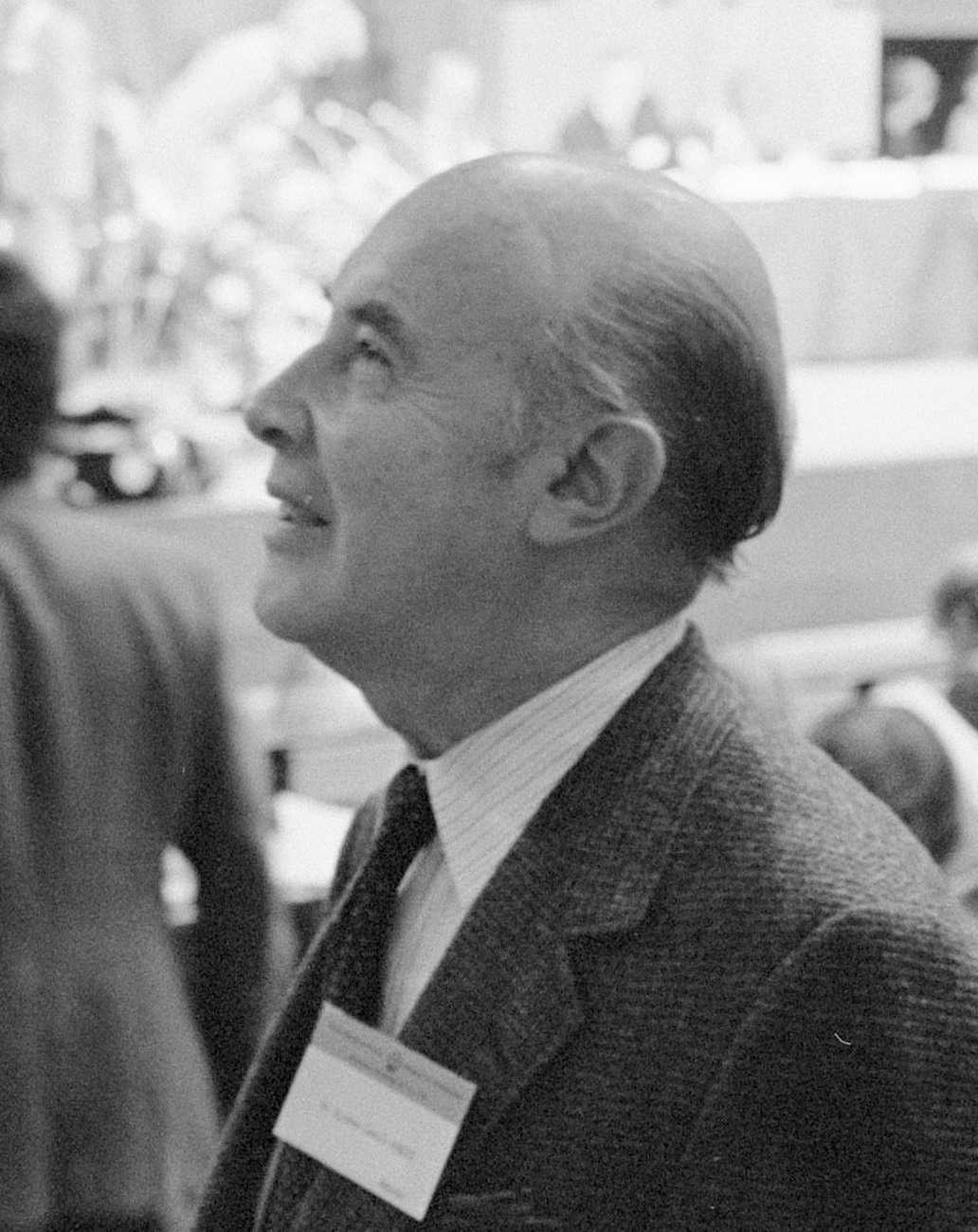
Alfonso García Robles, 1970 - 1975

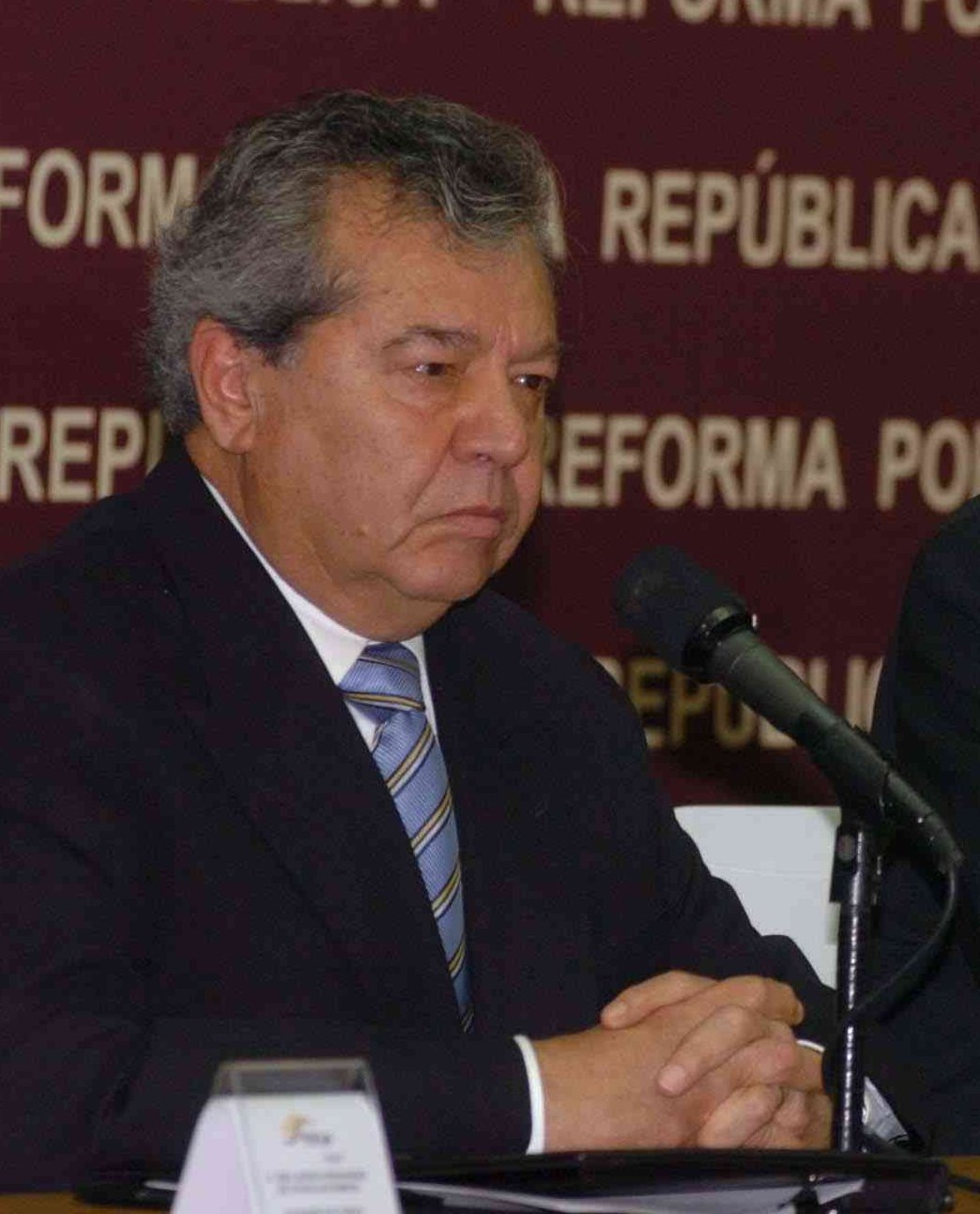
Porfirio Muñoz Ledo, 1979-1985

== See also ==
- Foreign relations of Mexico
- Permanent Mission of Mexico to the United Nations in Geneva
- Mexico and the United Nations

== Other Mexican representation in the United Nations system ==
To the UN offices:

- Permanent Representative of Mexico to the United Nations Office and International Organizations in Geneva
- Permanent Representative of Mexico to the United Nations Office and International Organizations in Vienna (assumed by its Austrian Embassy)

To the other United Nations organs:

- Permanent Mission of Mexico to the International Civil Aviation Organization
- Permanent Mission of Mexico to the United Nations Offices in Rome
- Permanent Mission of Mexico to the United Nations Educational, Scientific and Cultural Organization
