= Embassy of Mexico, Vienna =

Embassy of Mexico in Austria
- Embajada de México en Austria

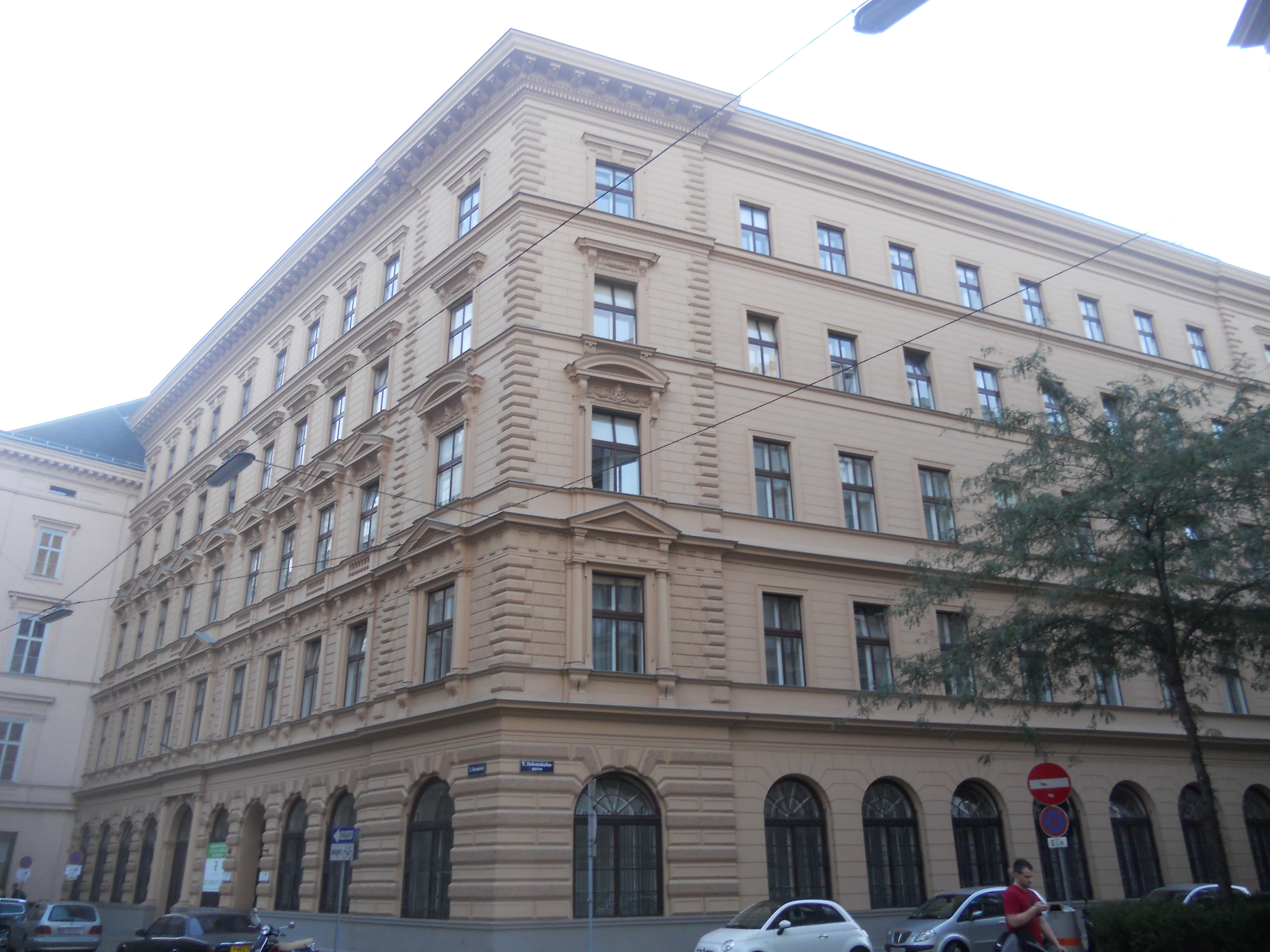
- Incumbent; Luis Javier Campuzano Piña since 12 July 2020
- Style: Excellency
- Type: Diplomatic mission
- Status: Active
- Reports to: Secretariat of Foreign Affairs; President of Mexico
- Seat: Renngasse 5/5; Vienna, Austria
- Appointer: President of Mexico with Senate advice and consent
- Term length: No set term length
- Formation: 1842
- First holder: Tomás Murphy y Alegría
- Website: embamex.sre.gob.mx/austria

The Embassy of Mexico in Austria, based out of Vienna, is the primary diplomatic mission from the United Mexican States to the Republic of Austria. It is also accredited to the Slovak Republic, the Republic of Slovenia and the United Nations Office at Vienna.

== Location ==
The chancery and the consular section of the Embassy is located on the first floor of Renngasse 5 in Vienna.

In addition to the embassy in Vienna, Mexico also maintains a consulate in the town of Wattens that is responsible for representing Mexico in the Austrian states of Tyrol and Salzburg. It is located at Blattenwaldweg 8.

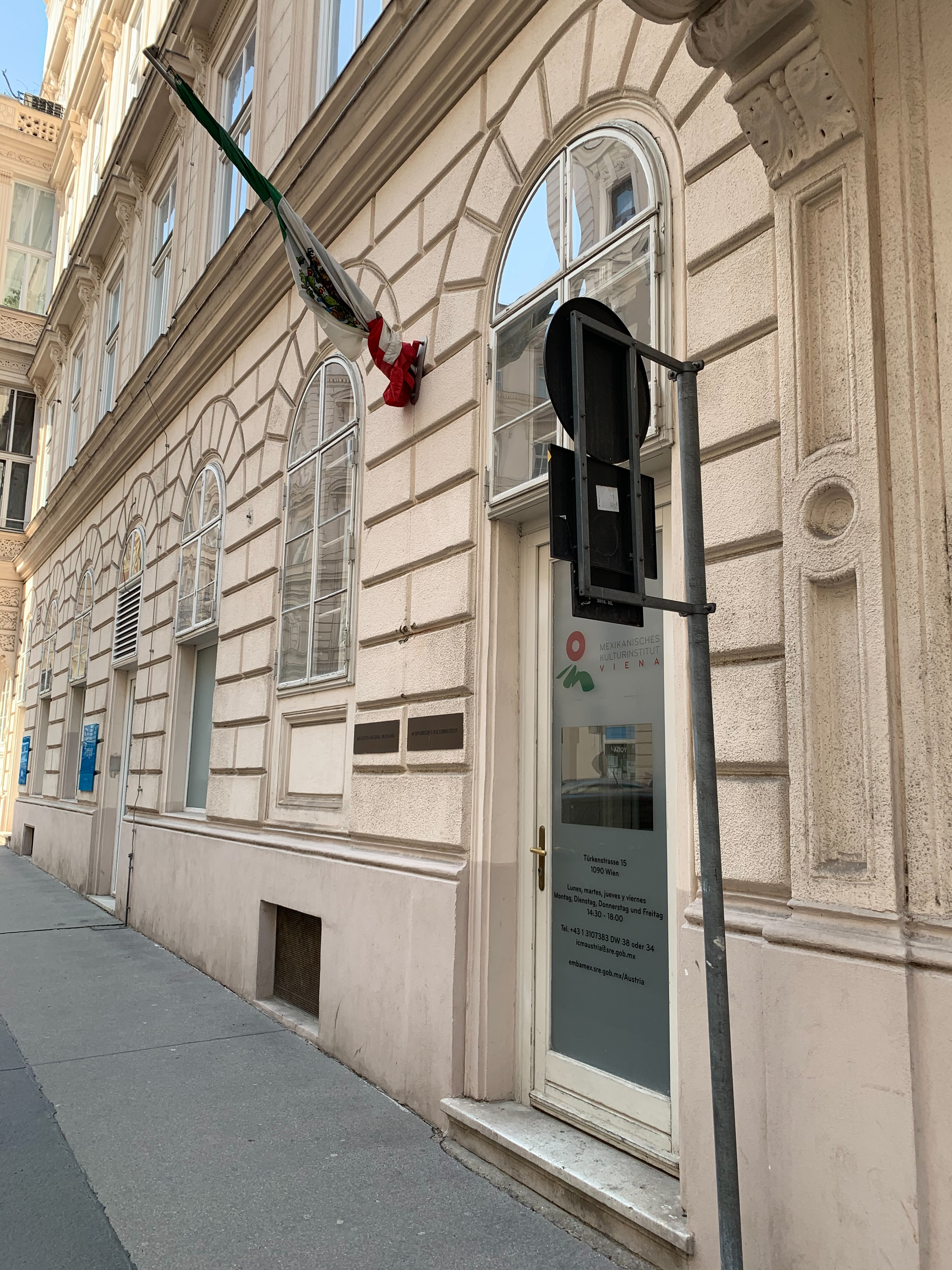
Mexican Cultural Institute in Vienna

Mexico also maintains a cultural institute in Vienna showcasing Mexican art, culture and film. The institute opened in 1996 and is located at Türkenstraße 15 in Vienna.

== History ==
Mexico and Austria established diplomatic relations on 30 July 1842 via the Treaty of Friendship, Navigation and Commerce.

Relations between the two countries were strained when, in December of 1861, Napoleon III successfully invaded Mexico under the pretext of recovering unpaid debts. However, Napoleon really intended to extend France's influence in the region by establishing a French client state. While the French were eventually repelled, its actions had damaged Mexican opinion of European nations and on 8 December 1867, President Benito Juárez severed ties with all European countries. Relations with Austria remained severed until June of 1901, when they were reestablished by President Porfirio Díaz.

Relations were again severed in 1938 due to the Anschluss of Austria by Nazi Germany. Mexico was the only country to protest this action before the League of Nations. After the war, relations were reestablished and have since flourished.

== Ambassadors ==
The Ambassador of Mexico to the Austria is the highest ranking diplomatic representative of the United Mexican States to the Republic of Austrian and subsequently holds the rank of "ambassador extraordinary and plenipotentiary." The following is a list of Mexican ambassadors since 2000:

- Under President Vicente Fox (2000 – 2006)
  - 2000 – 02: Olga Pellicer y Silva
  - 2002 – 06: Patricia Espinosa Cantellano
- Under President Felipe Calderón (2006 – 2012)
  - 2006 – 07: Fausto Armando Vivanco Castellanos (Acting)
  - 2007: Ulises Canchola Gutiérrez (Acting)
  - 2007 – 12: Alejandro Díaz y Pérez Duarte
- Under President Enrique Peña Nieto (2012 – 2018)
  - 2012 – 13: Alejandro Díaz y Pérez Duarte
  - 2013 – 16: Luis Alfonso de Alba Góngora
  - 2016 – 18: Alicia Guadalupe Buenrostro Massieu
- Under President Andrés Manuel López Obrador (2018 – Present)
  - 2018 – 20: Alicia Guadalupe Buenrostro Massieu
  - 2020 - Present: Luis Javier Campuzano Piña

== Slovenia ==
Mexico and Slovenia established diplomatic relations on 22 May 1992, the same day that Slovenia joined the United Nations.

In 1996 both countries signed the Memorandum of Understanding for the Establishment of a Mechanism of Consultation in Matters of Mutual Interest, as well as the Agreement on Educational and Cultural Cooperation Mexico – Slovenia, the first bilateral agreements signed between the two countries. That same year, Mexico opened an honorary consulate in Ljubljana.

While Slovenia does not maintain an embassy in Mexico, as its Embassy in the United States is accredited to Mexico, it does maintain two consulates in Mexico. These consulates are located in Guadalajara and Mexico City.

== Slovakia ==
Mexico and Slovakia established diplomatic relations on 1 January 1993, the first day of its existence. Prior to this, Mexico had maintained relations with Slovakia's predecessor, Czechoslovakia, since 1922, with a short respite during World War 2. In 1959 both countries established embassies in each others capitals. On 31 December 1992 Czechoslovakia was dissolved into the independent countries of the Czech Republic and Slovakia.

Initially Mexico was represented in Slovakia via its embassy in Prague. However, in 1996 Mexico accredited relations to Slovakia via its embassy in Vienna due to its close proximity to the Slovak capital of Bratislava.

Slovakia's diplomatic representation in Mexico includes and embassy in Mexico City, as well as honorary consulates in Monterrey and Cancún. Mexico maintains an honorary consulate in Bratislava.

== United Nations Office at Vienna ==
The Ambassador of Mexico to Austria also functions as Mexico's permanent representative to the United Nations Office at Vienna. The permanent representative is responsible for promoting the collaboration and interests of Mexico within United Nations organizations based in Vienna.

The permanent representative represents Mexico before the following organizations:

- Comprehensive Nuclear-Test-Ban Treaty Organisation Preparatory Commission
- United Nations Industrial Development Organization
- International Atomic Energy Agency
- United Nations Office at Vienna
- United Nations Commission on International Trade Law
- United Nations Office for Outer Space Affairs
- United Nations Office on Drugs and Crime
- Wassenaar Arrangement
- Nuclear Suppliers Group
- United Nations Committee on the Peaceful Uses of Outer Space
- International Anti-Corruption Academy

== See also ==
- Austria–Mexico relations
- Foreign relations of Mexico
- List of diplomatic missions of Mexico
