= Socorro Flores Liera =

Mexican diplomat and ICC judge

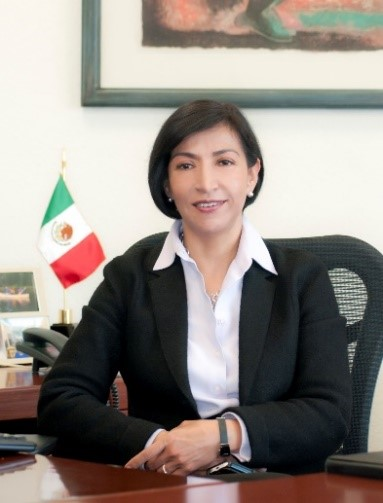

Judge of the International Criminal Court
- Incumbent
- Assumed office 11 March 2021
- Nominated by: Mexico
- Appointed by: Assembly of States Parties

Permanent Representative of Mexico to the United Nations in Geneva
- In office 2017–2021
- Preceded by: Jorge Lomónaco Tonda
- Succeeded by: Francisca Elizabeth Méndez Escobar

Personal details
- Born: 15 September 1965 (age 60) Mexico City, Mexico

María del Socorro Flores Liera (Note: In this Mexican name, the surname is Flores and the second or maternal family name is Liera.) (born 15 September 1965), known as Socorro Flores Liera, is a Mexican lawyer, diplomat and judge of the International Criminal Court (ICC) in The Hague. Prior to this tenure, she was Mexico's permanent representative to the United Nations Office at Geneva.

== Early and education ==
Flores Liera was born in Mexico City. She studied Law at the Universidad Iberoamericana and obtained advanced degree in International Law from the National Autonomous University of Mexico (UNAM).

== Career ==
She started her diplomatic career in 1992 when she joined the Secretariat of Foreign Affairs (SRE) and rose through the ranks to the position of Director of International Law in the Legal Consultancy and Coordinator of Advisors in the Undersecretariat for Multilateral Affairs and Human Rights. As a diplomat, she was in charge of the Mexican delegation involved in the negotiations which led to the Rome Statute in 1998 and in consequence to the establishment of the International Criminal Court. She was the head of the General Directorate for Global Issues (DGTG) and General Director of American Regional Organizations and Mechanisms (DGOMRA) from 2013 to 2015. In 2017, she was appointed Mexico's Permanent Representative to the United Nations in Geneva, Switzerland. She was elected Judge of the International Criminal Court by the Assembly of States Parties to the ICC following the Court's Independent Expert Report which showed that Liera received the highest rating and the highest number of votes among 18 contenders. She was sworn in to the court on 10 March 2021.
