= Foreign Policy Institute (SAIS) =

American research center

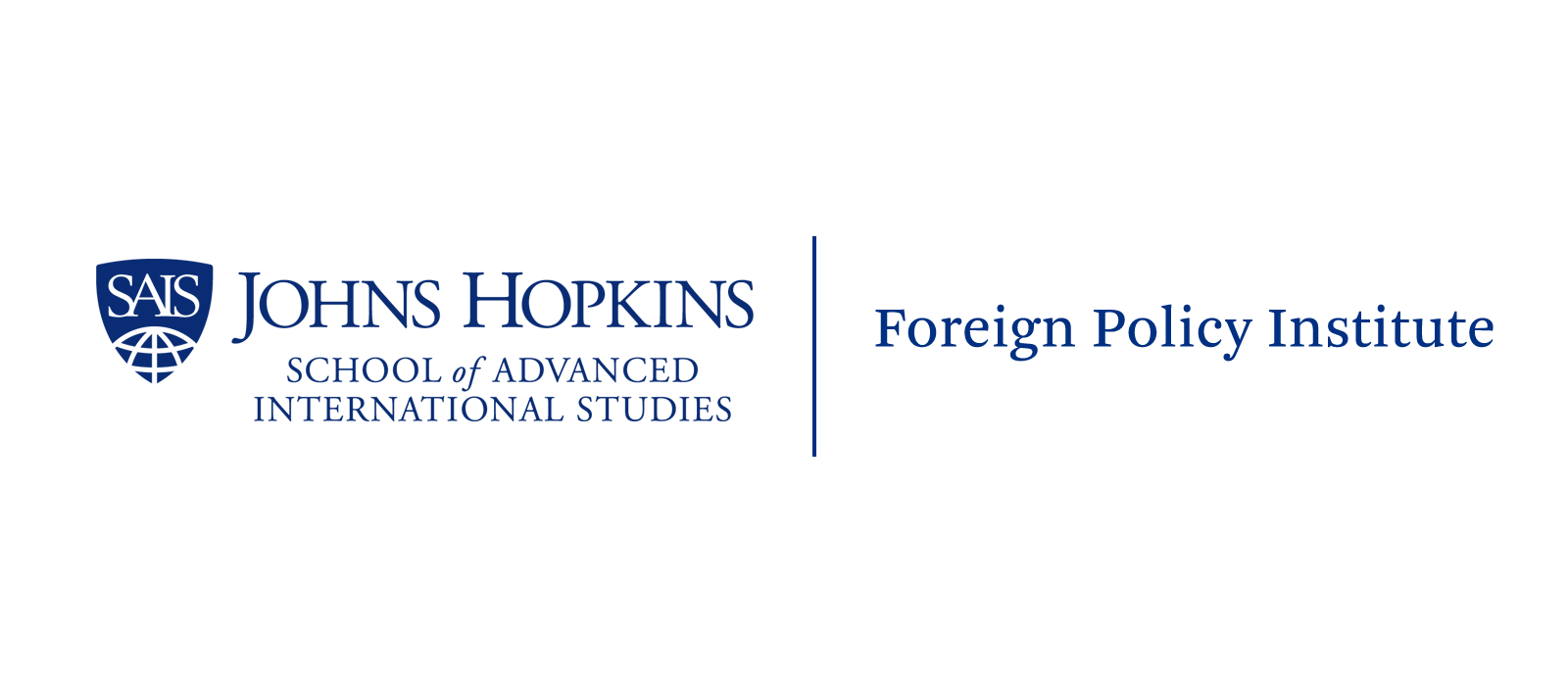

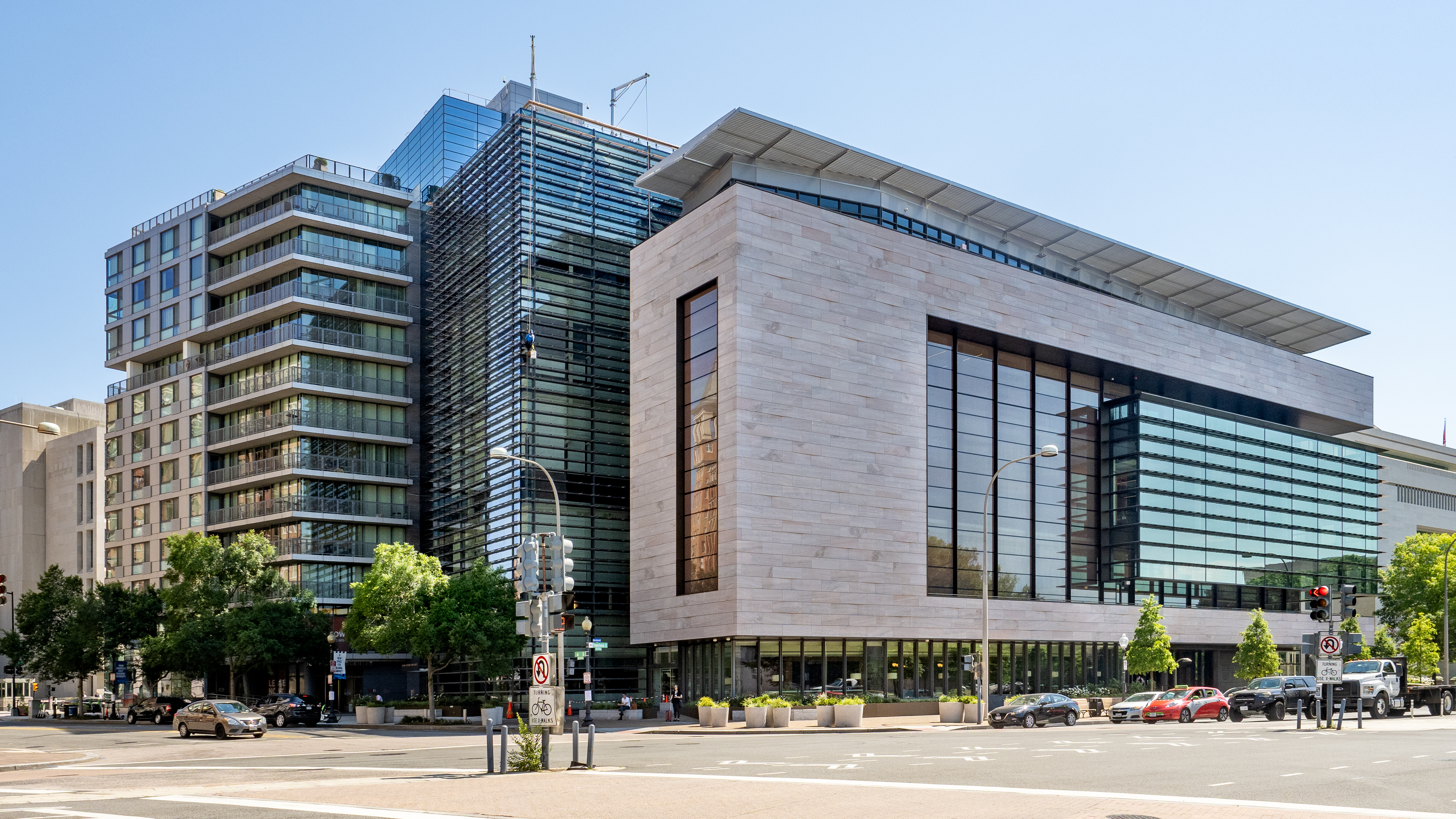
- Johns Hopkins University Bloomberg Center
- Abbreviation: FPI
- Formation: 1980; 46 years ago
- Type: University affiliated think tank
- Location: Washington, D.C.
- Director: Carla Freeman, PhD
- Chairman: James Steinberg
- Website: fpi.sais.jhu.edu

The Foreign Policy Institute (FPI) is a research center at the School of Advanced International Studies of Johns Hopkins University. It is located in Washington, D.C., United States.

The institute is housed within Johns Hopkins School of Advanced International Studies (SAIS) in the Johns Hopkins University Bloomberg Center Building in Penn Quarter in Washington, D.C. It organizes research initiatives and study groups, and hosts global leaders as resident or non-resident fellows in fields including international policy, business, journalism, and academia.

Its stated mission is "to unite scholarship and policy in the search for realistic answers to international issues facing the United States and the world".

== History ==
=== The Washington Center of Foreign Policy Research (1954–1980) ===
The Foreign Policy Institute (FPI) of the Johns Hopkins University's School of Advanced International Studies (SAIS) was formerly known as the Washington Center of Foreign Policy Research. The Washington Center of Foreign Policy Research was founded in 1957 by Paul H. Nitze, former Secretary of the Navy and Deputy Secretary of Defense; Nitze, a cold war strategist and expert on military power and strategic arms, whose roles as negotiator, diplomat and Washington insider spanned the era from Franklin D. Roosevelt to Ronald Reagan, was also one of the founders of SAIS. The first director of the Washington Center was international relations scholar Arnold Wolfers. The Washington Center, located in Washington, DC, served in effect as a major research division of SAIS. The center was founded with a grant from the Ford Foundation and survived on further grants from the Carnegie Corporation and the Ford, Avalon, Old Dominion and Rockefeller Foundations. One of the earliest university affiliated think-tanks in the United States, The Washington Center spurred the creation of similar centers at other policy schools as well.

=== The Foreign Policy Institute (1980–present) ===
In mid-1980, the Washington Center of Foreign Policy Research was replaced by the Foreign Policy Institute with some changes to its structure and output. Many of the programs of the center were adopted and expanded by the institute. Some personnel of the Institute were members of the center. The restructuring included the role of a chairman, an internationally known figure who provides prestigious leadership for the institute. Harold Brown, Secretary of Defense during the Carter administration, became FPI Chairman in July 1984. The responsibilities of the Director of the center were divided in the Institute between an executive director and the chairman. The current Chairman of The FPI is the Dean of SAIS, Vali Nasr.

Among FPI's early programs was its "Washington Roundtables," a series of discussions among academics, other foreign policy experts, and practitioners, on foreign policy and security issues facing the United States. In 1984, Senators Richard Lugar and Jake Garn established The Vandenberg Seminars at FPI. These convened members of Congress and senior corporate officials, the executive branch, and academia to discuss the role of Congress in foreign and national security policy. FPI's "Washington Briefings," also established in 1984, were aimed at giving foreign journalists from Western Europe, Asia, and Latin America a chance to be briefed by experts on the mechanics of US domestic and foreign policy.

During its formative years, the Foreign Policy Institute additionally established discussion groups on religion in the 21st century, Asian security, "new sciences," and new technology and international affairs. Regular programming included a "Current Issues" luncheon group led by former statesman and FPI senior fellow Zbigniew Brzezinski, and an outreach program for the mid-career professionals enrolled in the SAIS Masters of International Public Policy (MIPP).

Between 2000 and 2008, the Foreign Policy Institute introduced a number of new initiatives. The Protection Project, established at Harvard University's John F. Kennedy School of Government by FPI Fellow Laura Lederer in 1994, moved to SAIS in 2000. The Center for Transatlantic Relations (2001–2018) was established to strengthen transatlantic relations and address contemporary challenges. S. Frederick Starr, former White House advisor and policymaker founded and chaired, the Central Asia-Caucasus Institute, originally as a sub-program of The FPI that houses several publications on Russia and Eurasia. The SAIS Dialogue Project was founded in 2002. The Foreign Policy Institute's Cultural Conversations program was established in 2008 to further the Dialogue Project's outreach efforts.

In 2012 the Johns Hopkins SAIS established the Betty Lou Hummel Endowed Fund to create a permanent base of support for the Foreign Policy Institute.

== Leadership ==
The dean of Johns Hopkins SAIS has held the chairmanship of the Foreign Policy Institute. This position is currently held by James Steinberg, former Deputy Secretary of State and current dean of SAIS. The executive director is the functional head of FPI and oversees the programs and staff. Ambassador Cinnamon Dornsife, senior advisor of the international development program at SAIS, currently holds this position.

== Publications ==
In 1984, FPI launched its main publication, The SAIS Review of International Affairs which continues to be published under the same title. The SAIS Papers in International Affairs, prepared by members of the SAIS faculty, was another longstanding monograph series of The FPI which was discontinued. Other publications include FPI Policy Briefs, FPI Case Studies on formal diplomatic negotiations, and Policy Consensus Reports, which present recommendations of prominent American citizens on foreign policy issues.

== List of current fellows ==
- Nathaniel Ahrens
- James Borton
- Benjamin Cardin (fmr. US Senator)
- Seth Center
- Gregory Chin
- Cinnamon Dornsife
- Ludovico Feoli
- Francis Fukuyama
- Juan José Gómez Camacho
- Daniel S. Hamilton
- P. Terrence Hopmann
- Edward Joseph
- Cheng-Chwee Kuik
- David M. Lampton
- John Lipsky
- Daniel Magraw
- James Mann
- Daniel Markey
- Afshin Molavi
- Tanvi Nagpal
- Vikram Nehru
- Stephanie Papa
- Jeffrey F. Pryce
- Daniel Serwer
- Randa Slim
- Niklas Swanström
- Shirin Tahir-Kheli
- Mark White
- Maureen White
