= Alejandro Encinas =

Mexican politician (born 1954)

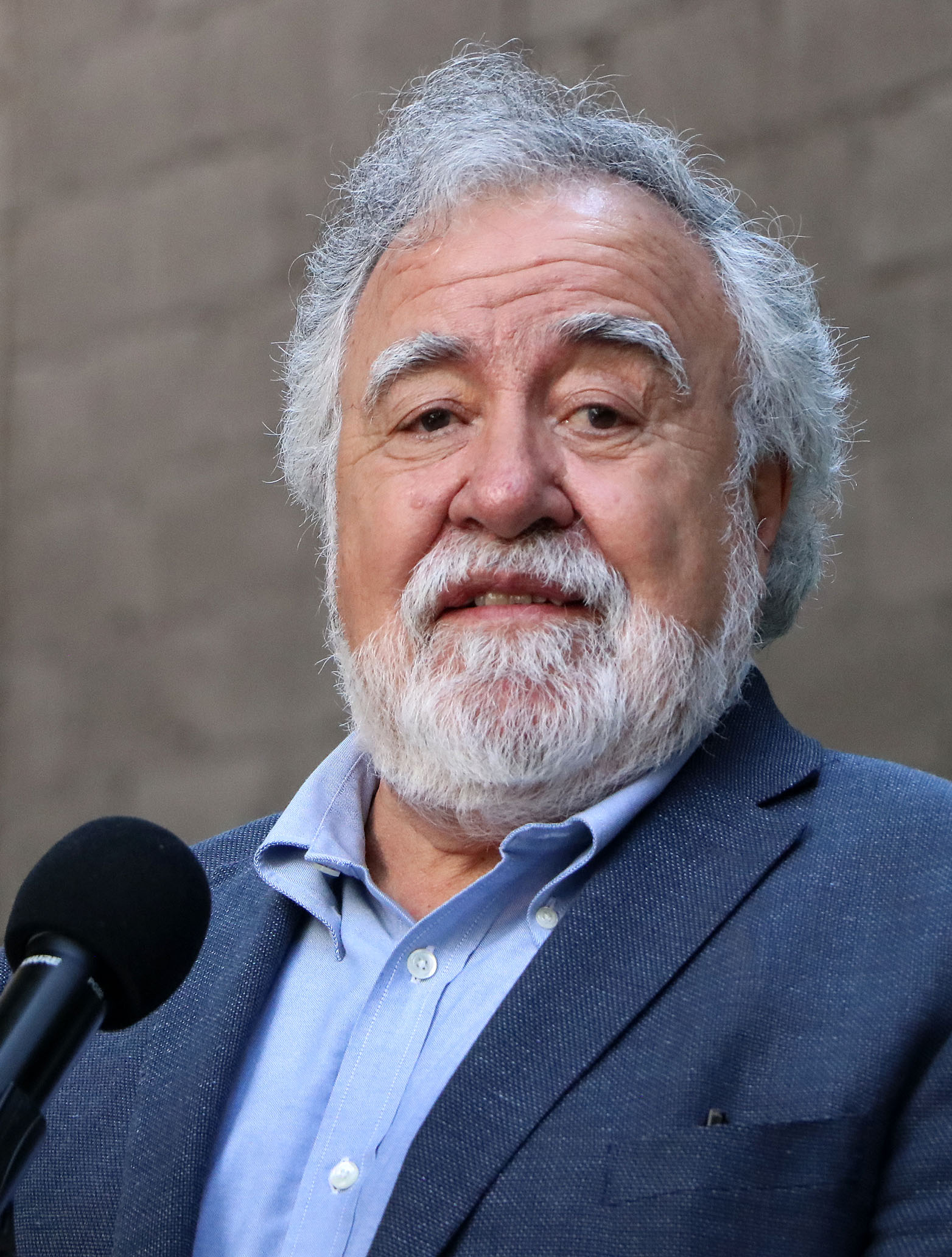
- Encinas in 2021

Secretary of the Interior
- Acting
- In office 16 June 2023 – 19 June 2023
- President: Andrés Manuel López Obrador
- Preceded by: Adán Augusto López
- Succeeded by: Luisa María Alcalde Luján

Senator of the Republic
- In office 1 September 2012 – 31 August 2018
- Preceded by: Ulises Ramírez Núñez
- Succeeded by: Juan Zepeda Hernández
- Constituency: State of Mexico

4th Head of Government of the Federal District
- Substitute
- In office 2 August 2005 – 4 December 2006
- Preceded by: Andrés Manuel López Obrador
- Succeeded by: Marcelo Ebrard

Government Secretary of the Federal District
- In office 21 March 2003 – 2 August 2005
- Preceded by: José Agustín Ortiz Pinchetti
- Succeeded by: Ricardo Ruíz Suárez

Secretary of Economic Development of the Federal District
- In office 5 December 2000 – 18 February 2002
- Preceded by: Leticia Calzada Gómez
- Succeeded by: Jenny Saltiel Cohen

Secretary of the Environment of the Federal District
- In office 5 December 1997 – 4 December 2000
- Preceded by: Position established
- Succeeded by: Claudia Sheinbaum

Personal details
- Born: 13 May 1954 (age 72) Mexico City
- Party: Independent (2015–present)
- Other political affiliations: PRD (before 2015)
- Education: National Autonomous University of Mexico (BA)

Alejandro de Jesús Encinas Rodríguez (Note: In this Mexican name, the surname is Encinas and the second or maternal family name is Rodríguez.) (born 13 May 1954) is a Mexican left-wing politician. He served in the cabinet of Andrés Manuel López Obrador during his tenure as head of government of the Federal District. Encinas succeeded López Obrador as head of government in 2005 after he resigned to run for president, and served until 2006. In 2023, he was appointed by López Obrador to serve as acting secretary of the interior in the federal government. Encinas previously served as a senator from the State of Mexico.

Encinas is currently a member of the National Regeneration Movement (Morena). He was previously affiliated with the Party of the Democratic Revolution (PRD), the Unified Socialist Party of Mexico (PSUM), the Mexican Socialist Party (PMS), and the Mexican Communist Party (PCM).

== Education ==
Alejandro Encinas was born in Mexico City on 13 May 1954. He has a degree in economics from the National Autonomous University of Mexico (UNAM).

== Career ==
He is a former researcher at the United Nations Economic Commission for Latin America and the Caribbean (ECLAC). He served twice in the Chamber of Deputies (1985–1988 and 1991–1994).

In 2000, he ran for borough chief (Spanish: delegado) of Álvaro Obregón, a borough of Mexico City. He was defeated by conservative opponent Luis Eduardo Zuno Chavira.

Following López Obrador's election as head of government of the Federal District ("mayor of Mexico City"), he served in his cabinet as secretary of economic development and as government secretary. After López Obrador resigned to run for president in 2006, Encinas became head of government, serving from 1 August 2005 to 4 December 2006.

Encinas provided official support for López Obrador's unsuccessful presidential campaign in the 2006 general election, and later supported the blockade of avenues in Mexico City.

He ran for the governorship of the State of Mexico in 2011 but lost to Eruviel Ávila Villegas of the Institutional Revolutionary Party (PRI). He later represented the State of Mexico in the Senate from 2012 to 2018. He was appointed acting secretary of the interior on 16 June 2023 by President López Obrador. He was succeeded in the position on 19 June 2023 by Luisa María Alcalde Luján.

In December 2025 he took office as Mexico's permanent representative to the Organization of American States (OAS).

== Notes ==
Preceded by Andrés Manuel López Obrador	Head of Government of the Federal District; 2005— 2006	Succeeded by Marcelo Ebrard
