= Pandemic Influenza Preparedness Framework =

The Pandemic Influenza Preparedness Framework (also called PIP Framework) is a public health instrument developed by the World Health Organization with the purpose to address pandemic influenza. The PIP Framework has supported countries to enhance their capacities to detect, prepare for and respond to pandemic influenza.

== See also ==
- Global Influenza Surveillance and Response System
