= Luis Alfonso de Alba =

Mexican diplomat

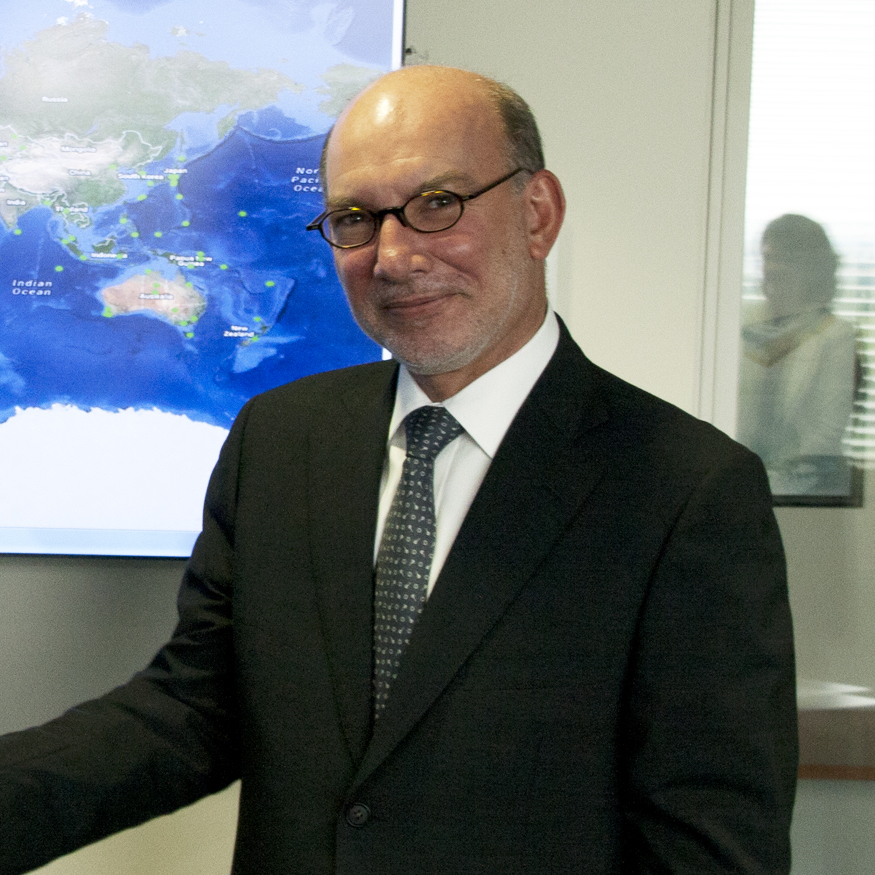

Ambassador of Mexico to Austria
- In office 2013–2016
- President: Enrique Peña Nieto
- Preceded by: Alejandro Díaz y Pérez Duarte
- Succeeded by: Alicia Guadalupe Buenrostro Massieu

Permanent Representative of Mexico to the United Nations
- In office 2011–2013
- President: Felipe Calderón & Enrique Peña Nieto
- Preceded by: Claude Heller Rouassant
- Succeeded by: Jorge Montaño y Martínez

1st President of the United Nations Human Rights Council
- In office 19 June 2006 – 18 June 2007
- Succeeded by: Doru Romulus Costea

Personal details
- Born: 1 March 1957 (age 69) Lagos de Moreno, Jalisco, Mexico
- Education: Institut d´Étude des Relations Internationales
- Profession: Diplomat

Luis Alfonso de Alba Góngora (born March 1, 1957) is a Mexican diplomat.

De Alba has been a diplomat since 1983 and was first appointed Ambassador in December 2001. Throughout his career, he has participated in numerous multilateral meetings, both at the global and regional levels, which has allowed him to gain substantive knowledge on the work and functioning of multilateral organizations, particularly those of the United Nations. In these fora, he has actively pursued the advancement of human rights, humanitarian issues and the rule of law, disarmament, the fight against climate change, and the promotion of development, including through the strengthening and improvement of the relevant international mechanisms.

In 2018, United Nations Secretary-General António Guterres appointed De Alba as his Special Envoy for the 2019 Climate Summit; in this capacity, he is to work closely with Robert C. Orr, Special Adviser to the Secretary-General on Climate Change; Peter Thomson, Special Envoy of the Secretary-General for the Ocean; and Michael Bloomberg, Special Envoy of the Secretary-General for Climate Action.

== Early life and education ==
Born in 1957, De Alba holds a degree in International Relations from the Institut d´Étude des Relations Internationales in Paris.

== Career ==
From 1983 to 1986, De Alba was posted to the Mexican Permanent Mission to the UN in New York, where he was responsible for the Decolonization Committee and a member of the Council for Namibia. He followed political issues such as the peace process in Central America (Contadora Group) and the situation in the Middle East.

In 1986 De Alba served as Head of the Political Department for the United Nations at the Ministry of Foreign Affairs, and from 1991 to 1994, as Director for Social Issues at the UN section of the Ministry. During this period he participated in the 1993 World Conference on Human Rights in Vienna, as well as in several sessions of the Commission on Human Rights, and the Third Committee of the United Nations General Assembly, in which he worked particularly on the situation of Human Rights in El Salvador and the protection of migrants and other vulnerable groups.

From 1994 to 1998, De Alba was Deputy Permanent Representative of Mexico to the Organization of American States (OAS), where he promoted important initiatives, such as the negotiation of the Inter-American Convention on the Elimination of Violence against Women, and the Interamerican Convention against the Illicit Manufacturing of and Trafficking in Fire Arms, Ammunition, Explosives, and other Related Materials (CIFTA). He also served as the Facilitator of the Declaration of the Summit on Sustainable Development (Santa Cruz, Bolivia, 1996) and in the preparation of the Summits of the Americas (Miami, 1994 and Santiago, 1998).

De Alba was General Director for the United Nations System of the Mexican Ministry of Foreign Affairs from 1998 to 2001. Among other tasks, he coordinated the participation of the Mexican Delegations in different international meetings, in particular the 2001 World Conference against Racism in Durban, South Africa, and the Special Session of the General Assembly on Children (2002). He was a member of the Mexican Delegation to the United Nations Conference on the Illicit Trade in Small Arms (2001), where he promoted a multidimensional approach to include humanitarian and human rights concerns. He took part in the negotiations of the United Nations Convention against Transnational Organized Crime (UNTOC) and its Optional Protocols on trafficking in persons, smuggling of migrants, and the illicit manufacturing and trafficking in firearms.

In 2002 De Alba promoted the yearly General Assembly resolution on the protection of human rights and fundamental freedoms while countering terrorism, a first step that, combined with the resolutions of the Commission on Human Rights and the Human Rights Council, led to the establishment of the Special Rapporteur of the Council on that matter. In his capacity as Deputy Permanent Representative to the United Nations Security Council during that period, those efforts were accompanied by the promotion of human rights within the Counter-Terrorism Committee (CTC) of the Security Council.

From 2002 to 2004 De Alba was Deputy Permanent Representative of Mexico to the United Nations in New York. He promoted the Mexican initiative to elaborate the Convention on the Rights of Persons with Disabilities, including the establishment of the negotiating Committee. He also pursued and achieved several measures that granted full participation of civil society, particularly of persons with disabilities, in the elaboration of the Treaty.

De Alba served as Permanent Representative of Mexico to the International Organizations in Geneva from 2004 to 2009 and was elected Chairman of the Disarmament and International Security Committee (First Committee) of the General Assembly during its 59th Session (2004). Under his chairmanship, the Committee approved an initiative for the revitalization of its work, and in particular for the strengthening of dialogue and cooperation to advance the committee's agenda.

He was Chairman of the Council of the International Organization for Migration (IOM) at its 88th and 89th Sessions (November 2004 to November 2005). During his tenure, he undertook broad consultations leading to a comprehensive proposal for a new strategy to further improve the work and functioning of IOM and to develop a new paradigm on migration placing the rights of migrants at its core.

On 19 May 2006, De Alba was unanimously elected First President of the United Nations Human Rights Council, a mandate he held from 19 June 2006 to 18 June 2007. During that period, the council was entrusted by the General Assembly to design the new institutions of the international human rights system, while at the same time fulfilling its mandate to promote and protect human rights, to avoid a protection vacuum. Furthermore, De Alba actively promoted the negotiation and adoption of the UN Declaration on the Rights of Indigenous Peoples. For his role in the council, he was considered a strong candidate for the post of High Commissioner for Human Rights in 2008; the role instead went to Navi Pillay.

In June 2009 De Alba was appointed Mexico's Special Representative for Climate Change and led negotiations for the 2010 United Nations Climate Change Conference (COP16). According to several diplomats involved in the negotiations, he helped to restore trust in the multilateral process after COP15 in Copenhagen. He was nominated for the Chatham House Prize (2011) for his role as chief negotiator at this high-level meeting.

From 2011 to 2013 De Alba was Mexico's Permanent Representative to the United Nations (New York), where he introduced a new resolution on Special Political Missions of the UN, seeking greater transparency and accountability. He actively participated at the Rio+20 Conference on Sustainable Development (Rio, Brazil, 2012) and was elected Senior Vice-President of the United Nations Economic and Social Council (ECOSOC) in 2012. He served as Co-Facilitator of the High-Level Event on the Rule of Law (2012), led negotiations for the General Assembly Declaration of the High-level Dialogue on International Migration and Development (2013), and, along with an indigenous representative, facilitated the preparation of the World Conference on Indigenous Peoples.

In June 2013 De Alba was appointed Mexican Ambassador to Austria, concurrent with Slovakia and Slovenia and Permanent Representative to the International Organizations based in Vienna. Under his Chairmanship, the Expert Group on Protection Against Trafficking in Cultural Property approved the Guidelines for Crime Prevention and Criminal Justice Responses concerning trafficking in cultural property and other related offences (2014). He chaired the 24th Session of the United Nations Congress on Crime Prevention and Criminal Justice (2015) and facilitated negotiations of the Doha Declaration approved at the 13th United Nations Congress on Crime Prevention and Criminal Justice (Doha, Qatar, 2015).

From May 2016 to September 2017 he was Permanent Representative of Mexico to the Organization of American States.

Since September 2017 De Alba has been serving as the Undersecretary for Latin America and the Caribbean, appointed by the Minister of Foreign Affairs of Mexico.

He has been appointed as Special Envoy for the 2019 Climate Summit by Antonio Guttieres in November 2018.
