= Encinas =

- Municipality
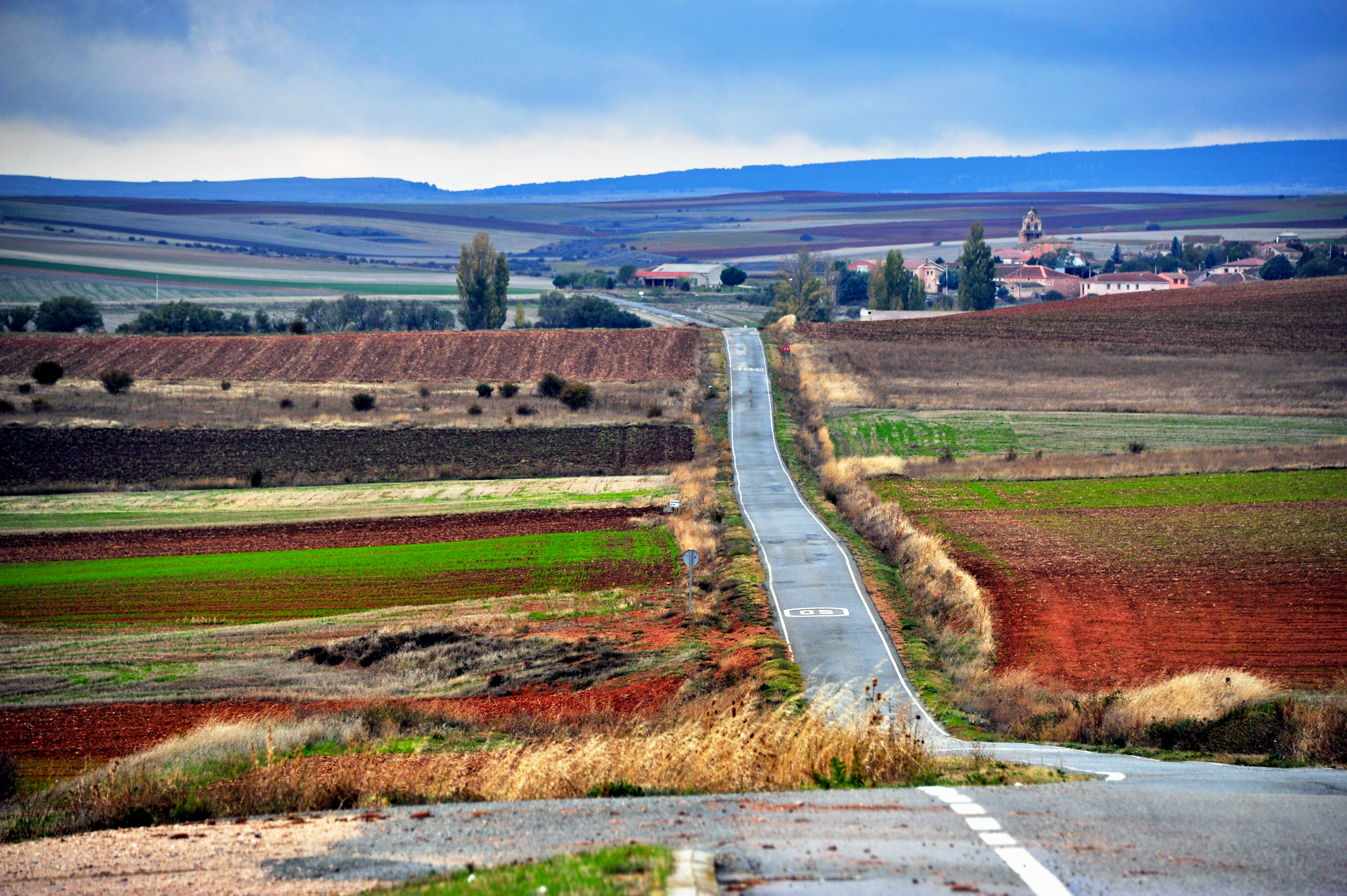
- View of Encinas in Tierras de Sepulveda

- Location in Spain. Encinas (Spain)
- Coordinates: 41°22′32″N 3°40′02″W
- Country: Spain
- Autonomous community: Castile and León
- Province: Segovia
- Municipality: Encinas

Area
  - Total: 17 km^{2} (6.6 sq mi)

Population (2025-01-01)
  - Total: 39
  - Density: 2.3/km^{2} (5.9/sq mi)
- Time zone: UTC+1 (CET)
  - Summer (DST): UTC+2 (CEST)
- Website: Official website

Encinas is a municipality located in the province of Segovia, Castile and León, Spain. According to the 2014 census (INE), the municipality has a population of 52 inhabitants.
