= Afshin Molavi =

Iranian-American journalist, commentator and economist

- Born: Tabriz, Iran
- Education: Johns Hopkins University SAIS
- Occupations: Senior research fellow, journalist, author, analyst
- Writing career
- Years active: 1997–present
- Notable work: Persian Pilgrimages: Journeys Across Iran

Afshin Molavi (Persian: افشین مولوی) is an Iranian-American author and co-director of Emerge 85 Lab, a joint research initiative between the Johns Hopkins Foreign Policy Institute and UAE-based Delma Institute. He is also a senior research fellow at the New America Foundation, Johns Hopkins University Paul H. Nitze School of Advanced International Studies, and a senior advisor at Oxford Analytica. At New America, he co-directs the World Economy Roundtable, which focuses on changes in the global economy following the Great Recession. In 2005, he was selected as a 'Young Global Leader' by the World Economic Forum in Davos, Switzerland, by a selection committee chaired by Queen Rania of Jordan.

== Life and career ==
Molavi holds a Master's Degree in Middle Eastern History and International Economics from the Johns Hopkins University Paul H. Nitze School of Advanced International Studies, where he also studied Arabic. A former correspondent based in Dubai for Reuters news agency, in Tehran for The Washington Post, and in Riyadh as a business and economics writer for Arab News, Molavi has written on the Middle East, US regional policy, geo-economic trends, and globalization for various international publications.

His articles and op-eds pieces have appeared in publications such as The New York Times, Foreign Affairs, National Geographic, BusinessWeek, The New Republic, Foreign Policy, Institutional Investor, the Journal of Commerce, and The Wilson Quarterly. He wrote the 2007 National Geographic cover story on Dubai, titled "Sudden City." Molavi contributes to the Abu Dhabi-based newspaper The National.

Previously, Molavi worked at the International Finance Corporation (IFC), the private-sector development arm of the World Bank, where he managed civil society and media outreach for the Middle East/North Africa and Southern Europe/Central Asia regions.

As a fellow at the New America Foundation, Molavi studies the geopolitics and geo-economics of the Middle East and Asia, particularly the relationship between economic development and democratization. His current research interests include the economic implications of the Arab Spring and the "New Silk Road" and the growth of trade between the Middle East and Asia. Molavi’s work has also included research on economic development, globalization, and immigration policy.

He has discussed "The New Silk Road" at venues including a conference at the Woodrow Wilson International Center for Scholars on China and the Persian Gulf region, a World Bank Seminar titled The East-East Corridor, in an article in The Washington Post titled "The New Silk Road", and in The National, where he wrote about "the meeting of West Asia and East Asia."

Molavi's analyses of the 2009 Iranian presidential election have been cited in the media. He has expressed support for the Iranian Constitution of 1906 and advocated for civil society support for Iranians seeking freedom.

Molavi supports Iranian American civic outreach programs, including the Public Affairs Alliance of Iranian Americans (PAAIA). He was a keynote speaker at a PAAIA event in 2012.

== Public Engagement and Civic Activities ==
Molavi participates in public discourse and civic initiatives related to global economic and political developments. In 2012, Molavi delivered a keynote address at PAAIA's annual event.

- Speaking Engagements: Molavi is a speaker at international conferences, universities, and think tanks, addressing topics such as globalization, emerging markets, and geopolitical risks.

== Books ==
Molavi is the author of Persian Pilgrimages: Journeys Across Iran (Norton 2002), later released in paperback as The Soul of Iran (Norton, 2005). Foreign Affairs described the book as "a brilliant tableau of today's Iran," and it was included in Fareed Zakaria's CNN GPS recommended books on foreign policy.
