= Encinas (surname) =

Encinas is a surname. Notable people with the surname include:

- Lorenzo Díaz de Encinas (1599–1660), Spanish Roman Catholic prelate and Bishop of Ugento
- Aintzane Encinas (born 1988), Spanish retired footballer
- Alejandro Encinas Rodríguez (born 1954), Mexican politician
- Bobby Encinas (born 1961), American former BMX racer
- Carlos Encinas Bardem (born 1963), Spanish actor
- Emma Catalina Encinas Aguayo (1909–1990), first Mexican woman to obtain a pilot's license in her country, later an interpreter
- Javier Ángel Encinas Bardem (born 1969), Spanish actor
- Mónica Encinas Bardem (born 1964), Spanish actress
- Ramón Encinas (1893–1967), Spanish football player and manager

== See also ==
- Encina (disambiguation), which includes a list of people with the surname
