= Manuel Tello Macías =

Mexican diplomat (1935–2010)

Manuel Tello Macías (Note: In this Mexican name, the surname is Tello and the second or maternal family name is Macías.) (15 March 1935 – 23 March 2010) was a Mexican politician and diplomat who served as his country's secretary of foreign affairs.

== Early life ==
Born in Mexico City, he studied international relations at Georgetown University and obtained a master's degree in the same discipline at the Graduate Institute of International Studies in Geneva.

== Career ==
He was Mexico's ambassador to the United Kingdom and France, as well as a permanent representative at the United Nations in Geneva. He also served two periods as permanent representative to the United Nations in New York City: from January 1993 to January 1994 and from February 1995 to December 2000.

He served as the secretary of foreign affairs from 10 January to 30 November 1994. During his tenure, he signed the Organisation for Economic Co-operation and Development's formal invitation for Mexico to become a full member.

He was the son of the diplomat and secretary of foreign affairs Manuel Tello Baurraud, and the brother of the diplomat and economist Carlos Tello Macías, who served in the cabinet of President José López Portillo.
