= Juan José Gómez Camacho =

Mexican diplomat (b. 1964)

Juan José Ignacio Gómez Camacho
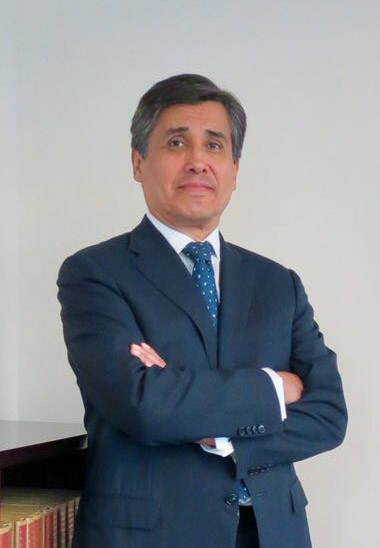
- Born: October 6, 1964; Mexico
- Education: Georgetown University

Juan José Gómez Camacho (born October 6, 1964) is a Mexican diplomat. He was appointed as Permanent Representative of Mexico to the United Nations in New York in February 2016. He served as ambassador (2019 to 2022) to Canada prior to joining Johns Hopkins University as a Senior Fellow for the Foreign Policy Institute (SAIS).

Some of his major achievements include the conclusion of breakthrough international agreements on emerging global health challenges (Pandemic Influenza and Antimicrobial Resistance); the adoption of the Global Compact for Migration and the successful negotiation of the framework of the new trade agreement between Mexico and the European Union. He has represented Mexico in numerous international negotiations on an array of bilateral, regional and multilateral issues over the years.

He has written and co-authored a considerable number of articles on general subjects ranging from International Law and Human Rights to Mexico’s foreign relations and policy. Other more specific topics include the challenges of global public health.

A career diplomat, Gómez-Camacho joined the Mexican Foreign Service in 1988. Since then, he has held different positions both within the Ministry of Foreign Affairs and overseas.

== Education ==
Gómez Camacho studied law at Universidad Iberoamericana and holds a master's degree in International Law from Georgetown University.

== Diplomatic career ==
Camacho joined the Mexican Foreign Service in 1988.

At the Ministry of Foreign Affairs, among other positions, he worked as Director General for Human Rights and Democracy (December 2000 to December 2005), where he implemented the modernization of Mexico’s foreign policy in the fields of human rights and democracy, and served as Mexico’s attorney of record on international human rights litigation. He was in charge of the legal affairs at the Mexican Embassy in the United Kingdom. In the Ministry of Foreign Affairs, as Director General for Human Rights and Democracy, he was responsible of the Mexican foreign policy in such issues, as well as Mexico's attorney for international disputes, among other positions.

He served as Ambassador to the Republic of Singapore, the Union of Myanmar and the Sultanate of Brunei Darussalam from 2006 to 2009. From August 2009 until December 2013 he was appointed Permanent Representative of Mexico to the United Nations and other international organizations based in Geneva, Switzerland.

In December 2013, he was appointed Ambassador of Mexico to the European Union and the Ambassador of Mexico to Belgium and Luxembourg. From 2013 to 2016 he served in that capacity, until his appointment as Ambassador and Permanent Representative to the United Nations in New York.

During his posting as the permanent representative of Mexico to the UN and other International Organizations in Geneva he had a prominent role in "landmark agreements" and multilateral negotiations such as the World Health Organization Pandemic Influenza Preparedness Framework (PIP), WIPO's Marrakesh VIP Treaty to Facilitate Access to Published Works for Persons who are Blind, Visually Impaired, or otherwise Print Disabled and the creation of the first special procedure within the UN Human Rights Council on the elimination of discrimination against women in law and practice.

Camacho was appointed Mexican ambassador to Canada in 2019. He resigned from the post in May 2022 to take up a professorship at the Paul H. Nitze School of Advanced International Studies at Johns Hopkins University. Currently he is a Senior Fellow at the Foreign Policy Institute (SAIS), and a member of the teaching faculty there. At SAIS, he teaches courses on global diplomatic challenges, and North American integration.
