= Tello (surname) =

Tello is a Spanish-Galician and Italian surname of Germanic origin meaning "tile". Notable people with the surname include:

- Cristian Tello (born 1991), Spanish former football winger
- Manuel Tello (born 1984), Spanish former football midfielder
- Sebastian Castro-Tello (born 1987), Swedish former football midfielder
- Fernando Gutiérrez Tello, Spanish noble
- Steve Tello (born 1950), television executive
