= CIFTA =

The Inter-American Convention Against the Illicit Manufacturing of and Trafficking in Firearms, Ammunition, Explosives, and Other Related Materials (CIFTA), originally the Inter-American Convention Against Illicit Firearms Trafficking in the Americas, is an international firearms control treaty.

== History ==
CIFTA as a program was approved during the First Plenary Session of the OAS held on November 13, 1997. Its purpose was to establish a regional standard for the control of the illicit manufacturing and trafficking in firearms: the Inter-American Convention against the Illicit Manufacturing and Trafficking in Firearms, Ammunition, Explosives and Other Related Materiales. CIFTA emphasizes the need for authorizations or licenses of export, imports and transit; the reinforcement of the checkpoints for exports, amongst other things. The Convention thus seeks to promote and facilitate the cooperation and exchange of information and experiences between OAS Member States. The Convention established a Consultative Committee gathering a representative for each State Party in order to guarantee its implementation, to promote the exchange of information, to facilitate cooperation and foster training between States.

The treaty entered into force in 1998.

== Membership ==
As of 2013, the treaty has been ratified by 31 of the 34 states in the OAS. The states that have not ratified the treaty are Canada, Jamaica, and the United States. Each of the three non-ratifying states are signatories to it.

=== United States ===
U.S. President Barack Obama has proposed that the U.S. Senate ratify CIFTA. Opponents are concerned that the measures contained within CIFTA could criminalize activities such as reloading ammunition if they are done without a license. Other provisions make unlicensed modification to any weapon a serious crime. Furthermore, there are provisions that expand infractions to larger groups of people effectively holding an organization responsible for the actions of a single member.

== See also ==
- Arms trafficking
- Assault Weapons Ban and Law Enforcement Protection Act of 2007
- Firearm case law
- Violent Crime Control and Law Enforcement Act
- Gun (Firearm) laws in the United States (by state)
- Gun Control Act of 1968
- Gun politics in the United States
- Political arguments of gun politics in the United States
- Organization of American States
