= Héctor Vasconcelos =

Mexican diplomat

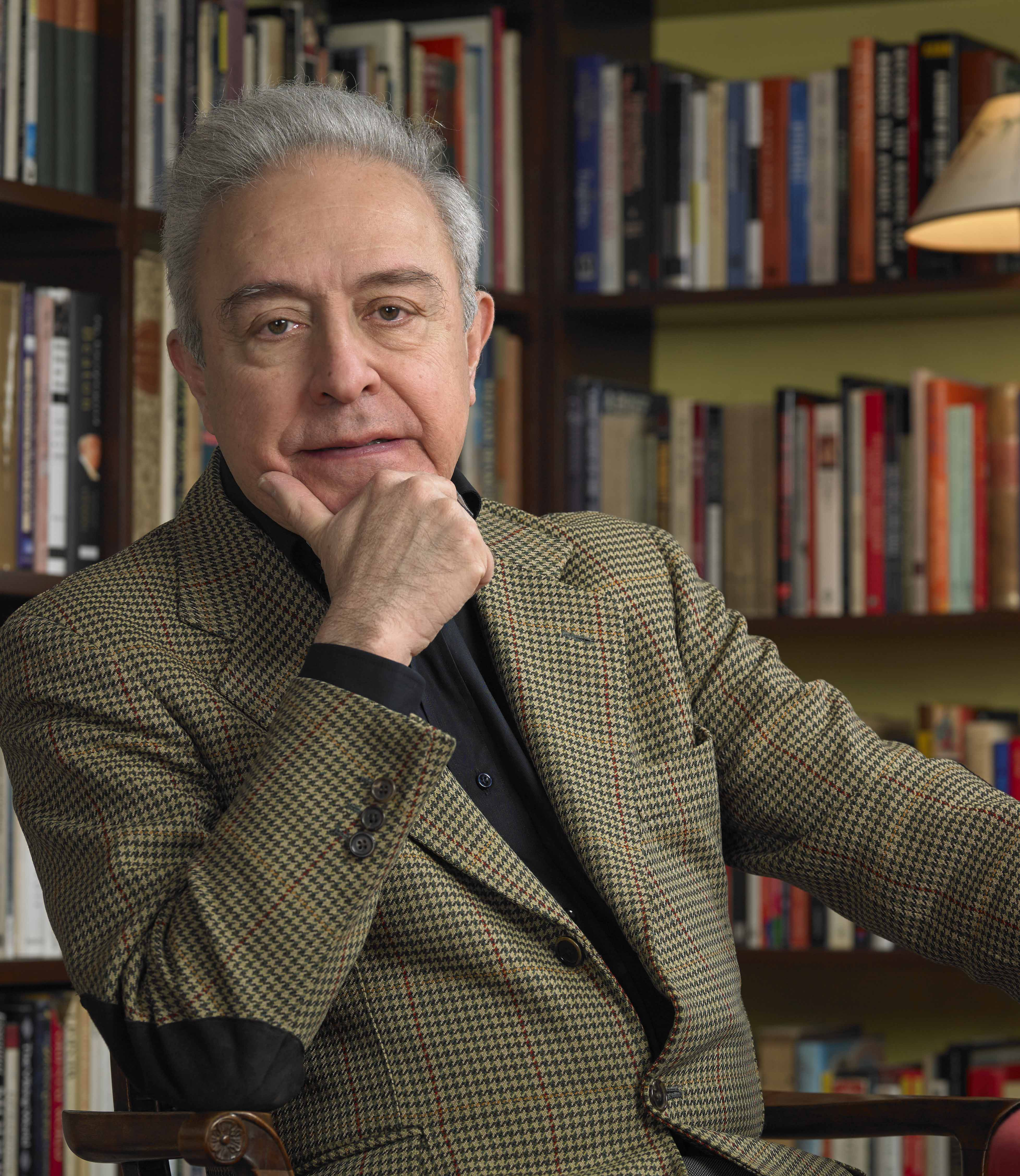

Permanent Representative of Mexico to the United Nations
- Incumbent
- Assumed office 30 January 2024
- President: Andrés Manuel López Obrador; Claudia Sheinbaum
- Preceded by: Alicia Buenrostro Massieu (acting)

Personal details
- Born: 14 February 1945 (age 81) Mexico City
- Party: Morena
- Parent: José Vasconcelos
- Education: Harvard, Cambridge, Oxford
- Occupation: Cultural functionary, politician, diplomat

Héctor Enrique Vasconcelos y Cruz (Note: In this Spanish name, the first or paternal surname is Vasconcelos and the second or maternal family name is Cruz.) (born 14 February 1945) is a Mexican politician and diplomat. He has served as the permanent representative of Mexico to the United Nations since 2024 and was previously the ambassador to Denmark, Norway and Iceland.

Following the 2018 general election, he was expected to be appointed the secretary of foreign affairs by incoming president Andrés Manuel López Obrador. Following his election as a national-list senator for the National Regeneration Movement (Morena), however, it was announced on 5 July 2018 that Marcelo Ebrard would serve as foreign secretary. Had Vasconcelos assumed the minsterial role, one of his main goals would have been to improve NAFTA.

== Early years ==
Héctor Vasconcelos was born in Mexico City on 14 February 1945, the only child of politician and writer José Vasconcelos and pianist Esperanza Cruz.

He studied music at conservatories in Mexico City and Geneva. He also earned a bachelor's in political science and international relations at Harvard University, a master's in political history from the University of Cambridge, and a doctorate in the same discipline from the University of Oxford.

== Professional life ==
Vasconcelos has held positions at the National Autonomous University of Mexico (UNAM) and with the Secretariat of Foreign Affairs (SRE) and the Secretariat of Finance and Public Credit (SHCP). From 1977 to 1982 he was the general director of the Cervantino Festival and, from 1989 to 1991, the general director of the National Fund for Culture and the Arts (FONCA). Between 1996 and 1999 he acted as consul general in Boston, United States, and from 1999 to 2004 he held the position of ambassador to Denmark, Norway and Iceland.

He was a founding member of the National Regeneration Movement (Morena). He contended unsuccessfully for the position of borough mayor of Benito Juárez, Mexico City, in 2015, and he was elected to one of Morena's national-list seats in the Senate in the 2018 general election. During his term in Congress he proposed an amendment to the Constitution that would include a reference to "scientific and humanistic" values in the text of article 3, on the right to education. He also chaired the Senate's Foreign Affairs Committee and sat on the foreign affairs committees for North America, Latin America and the Caribbean, and Europe.

On 14 December 2023 he resigned his Senate seat following his ratification to serve as permanent representative of Mexico to the United Nations in New York. He presented his letters of credence to Secretary-General António Guterres on 30 January 2024.

== Honours ==
- Order of the Rising Sun, 3rd Class, Gold Rays with Neck Ribbon (2025)
