= Manuel Tello (footballer) =

Spanish footballer

Personal information
- Full name: Manuel Diego Tello Jorge
- Date of birth: 16 February 1984 (age 42)
- Place of birth: Madrid, Spain
- Height: 1.80 m (5 ft 11 in)
- Position: Midfielder

Youth career
- 1995–2002: Real Madrid

Senior career*
Years	Team	Apps	(Gls)
2002–2004	Real Madrid C	33	(0)
2004–2005	Real Madrid B	9	(0)
2005–2006	Levante	7	(0)
2006–2008	Levante B	55	(1)
2008–2009	Navalcarnero	32	(4)
2009–2012	Getafe B	97	(3)
2012–2013	Alcalá	33	(2)
2013–2014	Guadalajara	34	(0)
2014–2016	Fuenlabrada	58	(0)
2016–2019	Internacional Madrid	72	(2)
2020	Navalcarnero	9	(0)
2020–2022	El Álamo	16	(2)
Total		455	(14)

International career
2000–2001	Spain U16	5	(1)
2002–2003	Spain U19	3	(0)
2003	Spain U20	4	(0)
2004	Spain U21	1	(0)
- * Club domestic league appearances and goals

Manuel Diego Tello Jorge (born 16 February 1984) is a Spanish former professional footballer who played as a midfielder.

== Honours ==
Spain U20

- FIFA U-20 World Cup runner-up: 2003
