= Manuel Tello Baurraud =

Mexican politician

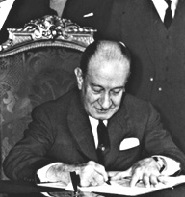
- Manuel Tello Baurraud on 29 August 1963

Secretary of Foreign Affairs
- In office 1951–1952
- President: Miguel Alemán Valdés
- Preceded by: Jaime Torres Bodet
- Succeeded by: Luis Padilla Nervo
- In office 1958–1964
- President: Adolfo López Mateos
- Preceded by: Luis Padilla Nervo
- Succeeded by: José Gorostiza

Ambassador of Mexico to the United States
- In office 1 December 1952 – 25 November 1958
- President: Adolfo Ruiz Cortines
- Preceded by: Rafael de la Colina
- Succeeded by: Antonio Carrillo Flores

Personal details
- Born: 1 November 1898 Zacatecas, Zacatecas
- Died: 27 November 1971 (aged 73) Mexico City
- Party: Institutional Revolutionary Party (PRI)
- Spouse: Guadalupe Macías
- Children: Manuel Tello Macías, Carlos Tello Macías
- Profession: Diplomat

Manuel Tello Baurraud (1 November 1898 – 27 November 1971) was a Mexican politician and diplomat, who represented his country at the League of Nations (1938–1941) and served twice as Secretary of Foreign Affairs; first in the cabinet of President Miguel Alemán Valdés (1951–52) and years later in the cabinet of Adolfo López Mateos (1958–64). In the interim, he served as ambassador of Mexico to the United States (1952–58).

Tello was born in Zacatecas, Zacatecas, on 1 November 1898. There, he completed his basic studies at the Christian Brothers School and at the Instituto Científico. He moved to Mexico City to enroll at the National Preparatory School and took some courses leading to a bachelor's degree in law at both Escuela Libre de Derecho and the National Autonomous University of Mexico (UNAM) without getting a degree.

He joined the foreign service in 1923, first serving as vice-consul in Brownsville (1924) and Laredo, Texas (1925); and later as consul in Antwerp (1925–1927), Berlin and Hamburg (1927–1929) and Yokohama (1930–1933). Next, he was appointed his country's envoy to the League of Nations, first as an alternate delegate (1934–1937) and later as delegate from 1938–1941.

Tello returned to Mexico in 1942 to hold several posts at the Secretariat of Foreign Affairs, rising through the ranks until he was appointed as Foreign Secretary by President Miguel Alemán Valdés in 1951. During his tenure, he declined Mexico's involvement in the Korean War. He left the post on 30 November 1952 to serve as Ambassador of Mexico in Washington, D.C., by instructions of President Adolfo Ruiz Cortines. He presented his credentials on 18 March 1953 and served until 25 November 1958, when he returned to Mexico City to be reappointed Secretary of Foreign Affairs by President Adolfo López Mateos.

During his second term, Tello signed the convention to end the Chamizal dispute on 29 August 1963 and thus settled an old border dispute between Mexico and the United States at El Paso, Texas, and Ciudad Juárez, Chihuahua.

After leaving the cabinet, Tello was elected to the Senate for his native state of Zacatecas for the 1964–70 term. He died in Mexico City on 27 November 1971.
