= First ladies and gentlemen of Mexico =

Spouse of the president of Mexico

First Gentleman of Mexico
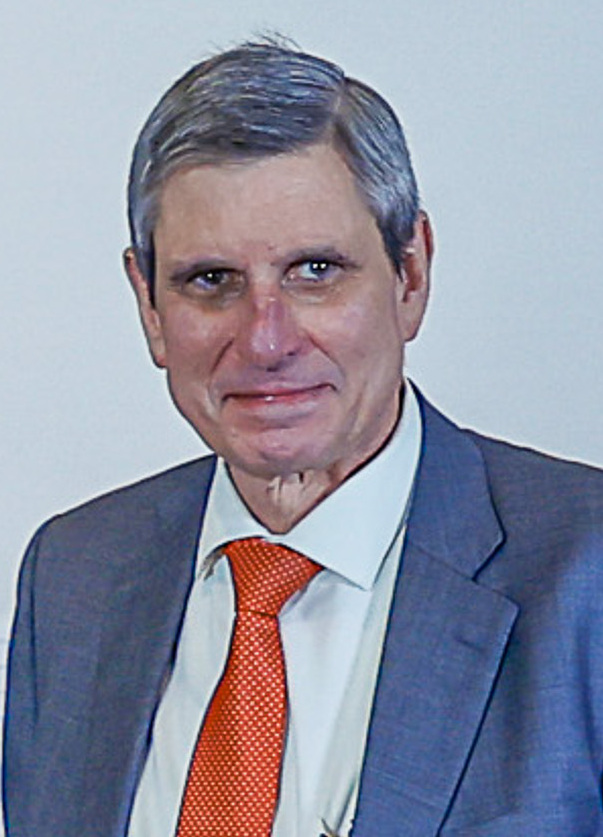
- Incumbent; Jesús María Tarriba since 1 October 2024
- Residence: National Palace of Mexico, Mexico City, Mexico
- Term length: 6 years
- Inaugural holder: María Antonia Bretón (as first lady); Jesús María Tarriba (as first gentleman)
- Formation: 1917
- Website: Gob.MX

The first lady of Mexico (Spanish: Primera Dama de México) or first gentleman of Mexico (Spanish: Primer Caballero de México) is the informal title held by the spouse of the president of Mexico, concurrent with the president's term of office.

The position has no legal foundation and was originally started as a courtesy title. However, several holders of the title have taken on ceremonial roles during the presidential tenure of their spouses and have used the position to advocate for various causes.

Jesús María Tarriba is the current First Gentleman of Mexico as the husband of President Claudia Sheinbaum Pardo.

== Role ==
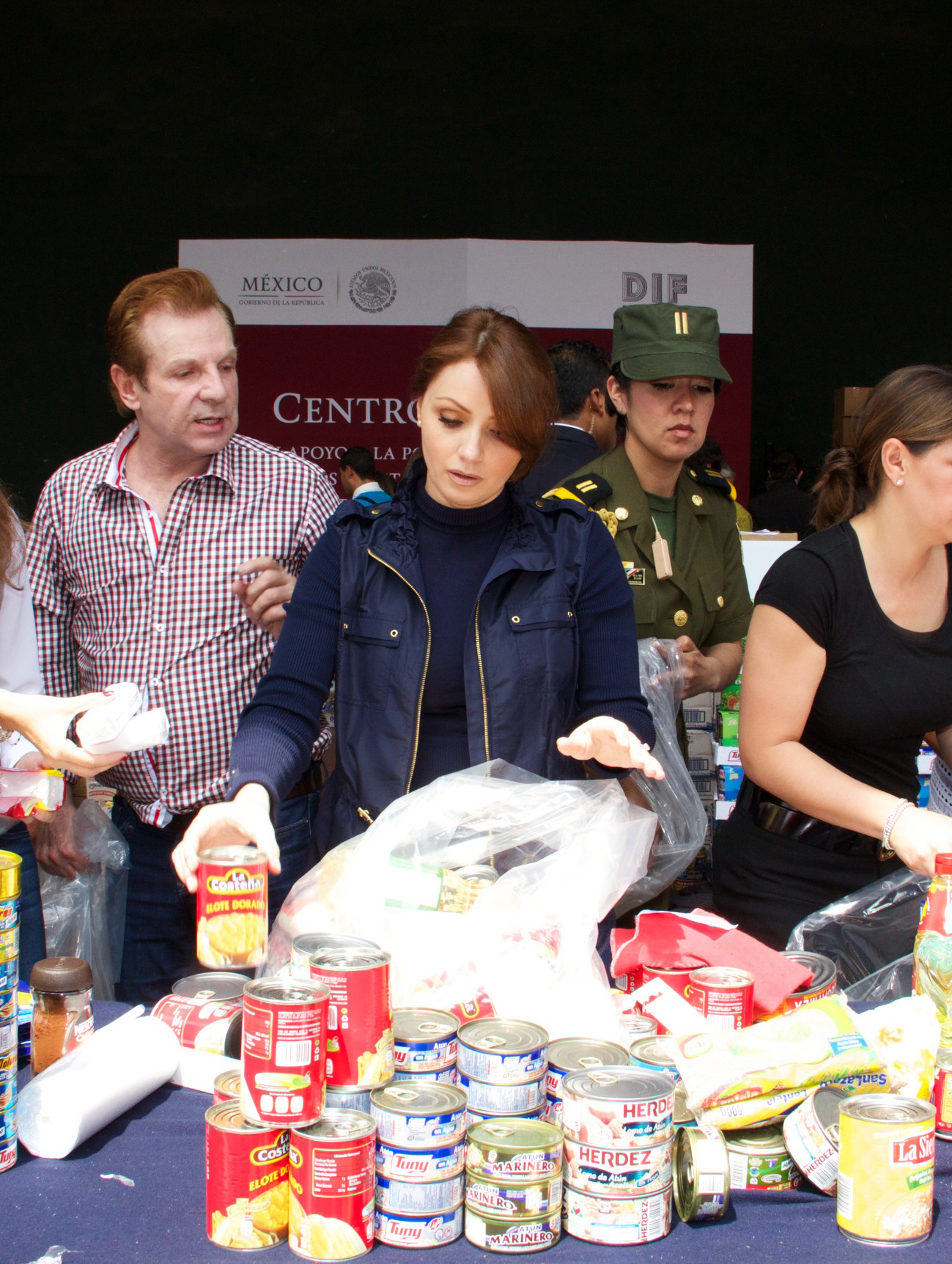
First Lady Angélica Rivera (2012 to 2018) at a donation drive for the victims of Hurricane Ingrid and Hurricane Manuel, as part of her role as head of the National DIF.

The first lady or first gentleman is not an elected position, carries no official duties and brings no salary. Nonetheless, the title holder attends many official ceremonies and functions of state either along with or in place of the president. There is a strict taboo against the president's spouse holding outside employment during the president's sexenio. Traditionally, the first lady took an important (ceremonial) post as head of the Desarrollo Integral de la Familia (DIF) ("Integral Family Development"). However, this did not occur during the Fox administration when First Lady Marta Sahagún founded the national philanthropic organization Vamos México.

== History ==
Two first ladies have been active politicians: Martha Sahagún, who married Vicente Fox during his tenure (2001–2006), had been a party activist and candidate for mayor of Celaya on the PAN party ticket, and was briefly considered a contender for PAN's nomination to run for either the Jefe de Gobierno (Governor of the Federal District) or president in the 2006 election. Margarita Zavala, wife of Felipe Calderón, was a deputy from 2003 to 2006. In the 2018 Mexican general election, she was a pre-candidate for the nomination of PAN, and then she briefly ran as an independent.

Beatriz Gutiérrez Müller (2018 to 2024), wife of Andrés Manuel López Obrador, abstained from using the title of first lady. She stated it was a "role with no concrete functions or responsibilities." She also said she wanted to "serve Mexico any way she can", and that the title "first lady" is "somewhat classist". Gutiérrez Müller also refused the position as head of the National DIF.

== List of first ladies and gentlemen of Mexico ==
Revolutionary era

Portrait	Name	President	Period
	-	Guadalupe Victoria	1824–1829
	María Guadalupe Hernández de Guerrero	Vicente Guerrero	1829
	María de Jesús Carranco de Bocanegra	José María Bocanegra	1829
	Guadalupe Quesada de Bustamante	Anastasio Bustamante	1830–1832, 1837–1839, 1839–1841
	Joaquina Bezares de Múzquiz	Melchor Múzquiz	1832
	María Juliana Azcárate de Gómez Pedraza	Manuel Gómez Pedraza	1832–1833
	Isabel López de Gómez Farias	Valentín Gómez Farías	1833–1834, 1846–1847
	Inés García de López de Santa Anna	Antonio López de Santa Anna	1833–1844
	Manuela de Trebuesto y Casasola de Barragán	Miguel Barragán	1835–1836
	Juana Fernanda Ulloa de Corro	José Justo Corro	1836–1837
	María Antonieta Guevara y Muñiz de Bravo	Nicolas Bravo	1839, 1843, 1846
	Refugio Almanza de Echeverría	Francisco Javier Echeverría	1841
	Josefa Dávila de Canalizo	Valentín Canalizo	1844
	Dolores Alzugaray de Herrera	José Joaquín de Herrera	1844–1845, 1848–1851
	Josefa Cortés de Paredes	Mariano Paredes y Arrillaga	1846
	Josefa Cardeña de Salas	José Mariano Salas	1846, 1859
	-	Pedro María de Anaya	1847, 1848
	María Luisa Ozta Cotera de la Peña	Manuel de la Peña y Peña	1847, 1848
	Guadalupe Martell de Arista	Mariano Arista	1851–1853
	Ángeles Madrid de Bautista Ceballos	Juan Bautista Ceballos	1853
	Refugio Alegría de Lombardini	Manuel María Lombardini	1853
	Dolores Tosta de López de Santa Anna	Antonio López de Santa Anna	1853–1855
	Ángeles Lardizábal de Carrera	Martín Carrera	1855
	Pilar Valera de Díaz de la Vega	Rómulo Díaz de la Vega	1855
	Faustina Benítez de Álvarez	Juan Álvarez	1855
	-	Ignacio Comonfort	1855–1858
	Margarita Maza de Juárez	Benito Juárez	1858–1871
	María de la Gracia Palafox de Zuloaga	Félix María Zuloaga	1858
	-	Manuel Robles Pezuela	1858–1859
	Concepción Lombardo de Miramón	Miguel Miramón	1859–1860
	Felipa González de Pavón	José Ignacio Pavón	1860
	-	Sebastián Lerdo de Tejada	1872–1876
	Juana Calderón de Iglesias	José María Iglesias	1876
	-	Juan N. Méndez	1876-1877
	Delfina Ortega de Díaz	Porfirio Díaz	1877–1880
	Laura Mantecón de González	Manuel González Flores	1880–1884
	Carmen Romero Rubio de Díaz	Porfirio Díaz	1884–1911
	Refugio Borneque de León de la Barra	Francisco León de la Barra	1911
	Sara Pérez de Madero	Francisco I. Madero	1911–1913
	María Enriqueta Flores de Lascuráin	Pedro Lascuráin	1913
	Emilia Águila de Huerta	Victoriano Huerta	1913–1914
	Ana María Gutiérrez de Carvajal	Francisco S. Carvajal	1914
	Petra Treviño de Gutiérrez Ortiz	Eulalio Gutiérrez	1914–1915
	María Concepción Garay de González Garza	Roque González Garza	1915
	-	Francisco Lagos Cházaro	1915

Post-revolutionary era

Portrait	Name	President	Period
	Virginia Salinas de Carranza (1861–1919)	Venustiano Carranza	1917–1919
	Clara Oriol de la Huerta (1884–1967)	Adolfo de la Huerta	1920
	María Tapia de Obregón (1888–1971)	Álvaro Obregón	1920–1924 (1928)
	Natalia Chacón de Elías Calles (1879–1927)	Plutarco Elías Calles	1924–1927
	Hortensia Elías Chacón (1905–1996)	Plutarco Elías Calles	1927–1928
	Carmen García de Portes Gil (1903–1979)	Emilio Portes Gil	1928–1930
	Josefina Ortiz de Ortiz Rubio (1892–1983)	Pascual Ortiz Rubio	1930–1932
	Aída Sullivan de Rodríguez (1904–1975)	Abelardo L. Rodríguez	1932–1934
	Amalia Solórzano de Cárdenas (1911–2008)	Lázaro Cárdenas	1934–1940
	Soledad Orozco de Ávila Camacho (1904–1996)	Manuel Ávila Camacho	1940–1946
	Beatriz Velasco de Alemán (1913–1981)	Miguel Alemán Valdés	1946–1952
	María Izaguirre de Ruiz Cortines (1891–1979)	Adolfo Ruiz Cortines	1952–1958
	Eva Sámano de López Mateos (1910–1984)	Adolfo López Mateos	1958–1964
	Guadalupe Borja de Díaz Ordaz (1915–1974)	Gustavo Díaz Ordaz	1964–1970
	María Esther Zuno de Echeverría (1924–1999)	Luis Echeverría	1970–1976
Carmen Romano portrait	Carmen Romano de López Portillo (1926–2000)	José López Portillo	1976–1982
	Paloma Cordero de la Madrid (1937–2020)	Miguel de la Madrid	1982–1988
	Cecilia Occelli de Salinas (1949)	Carlos Salinas de Gortari	1988–1994
	Nilda Patricia Velasco de Zedillo (1952)	Ernesto Zedillo	1994–2000
Marta Sahagún portrait	Marta Sahagún de Fox (1953)	Vicente Fox	2001–2006
Margarita Zavala portrait	Margarita Zavala de Calderón (1967)	Felipe Calderón	2006–2012
Angélica Rivera portrait	Angélica Rivera de Peña (1969)	Enrique Peña Nieto	2012–2018
Beatriz Gutiérrez portrait	Beatriz Gutiérrez de López Obrador (1969)	Andrés Manuel López Obrador	2018–2024
Jesús María Tarriba	Jesús María Tarriba Unger (1962)	Claudia Sheinbaum	2024–present

== Living former first ladies and gentlemen ==
As of 7 September 2026, there are six living former first ladies, as identified below.

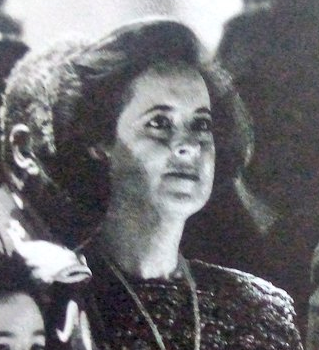
Cecilia Occelli
served 1988–1994
born 1949 (age 77)
ex-wife of Carlos Salinas de Gortari

Nilda Patricia Velasco
served 1994–2000
born 1952 (age 73)
wife of Ernesto Zedillo

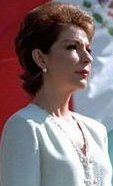
Marta Sahagún
served 2001–2006
born 1953 (age 73)
wife of Vicente Fox

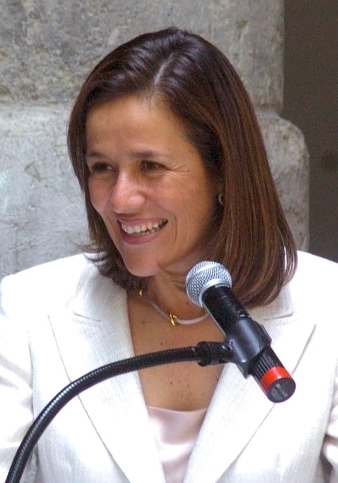
Margarita Zavala
served 2006–2012
born 1967 (age 59)
wife of Felipe Calderón

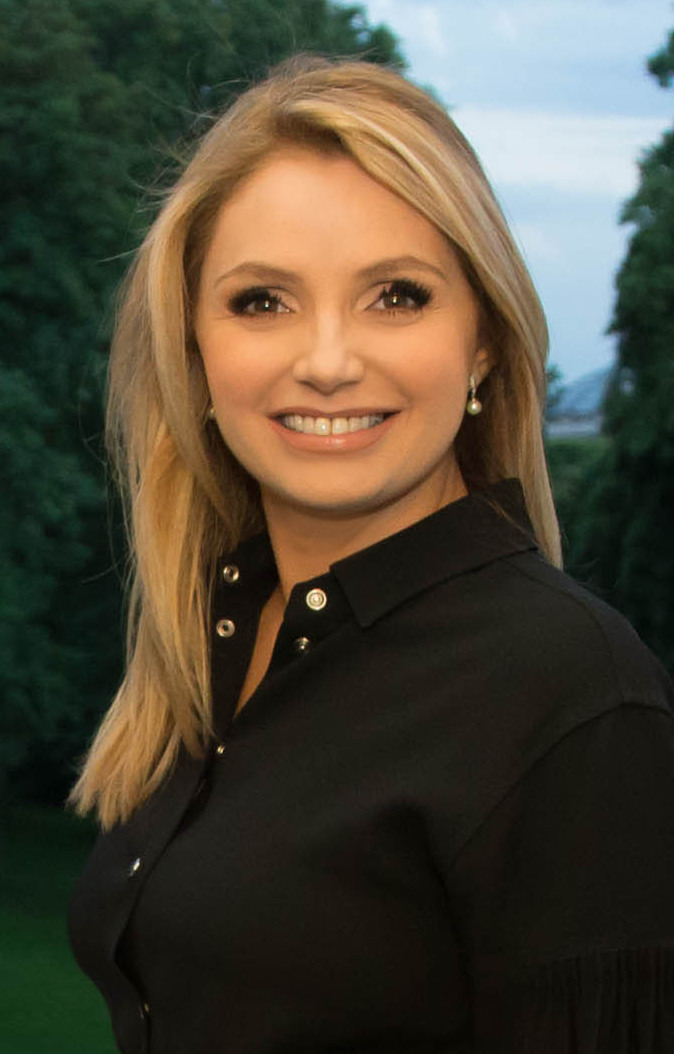
Angélica Rivera
served 2012–2018
born 1969 (age 57)
ex-wife of Enrique Peña Nieto

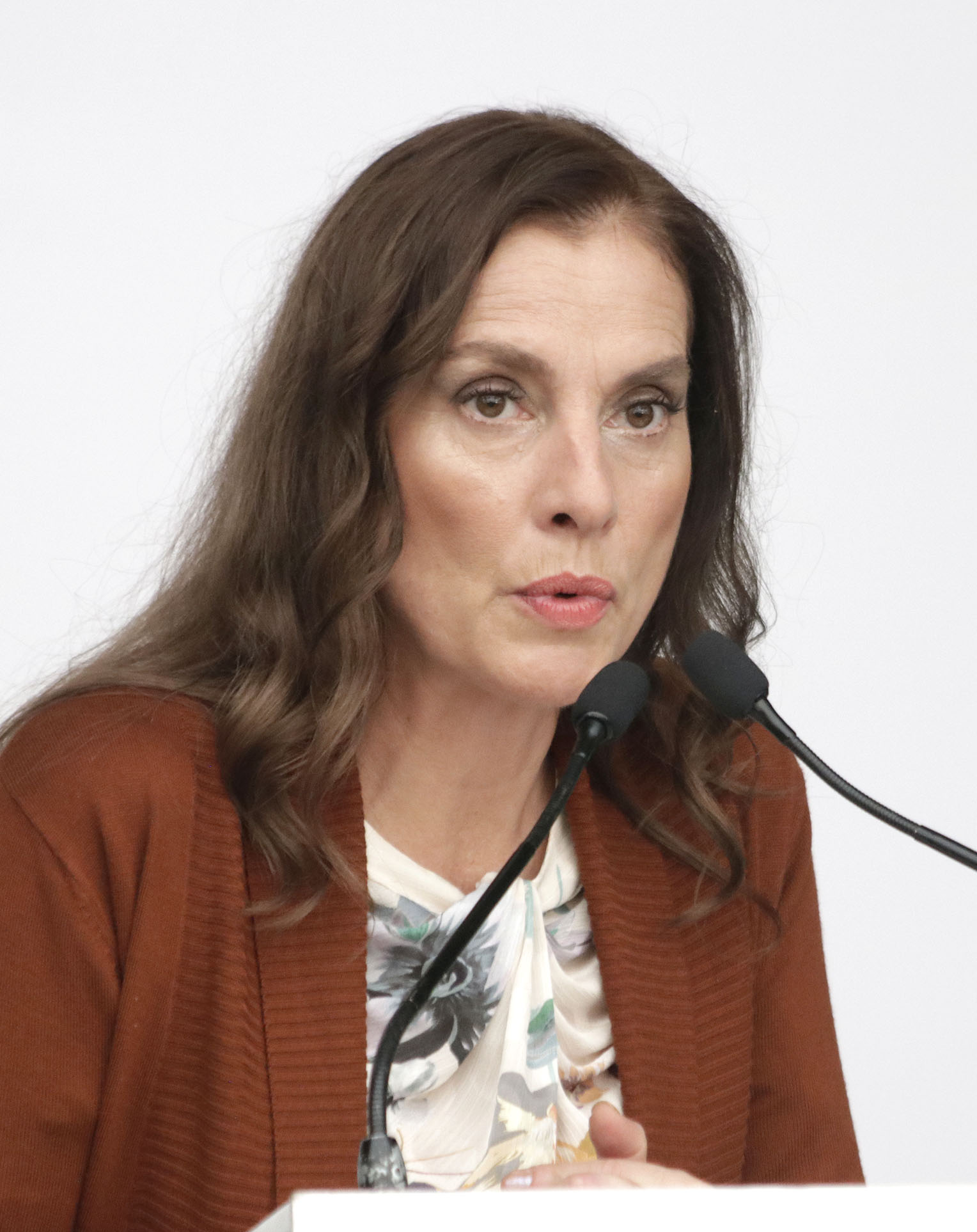
Beatriz Gutiérrez Müller
served 2018–2024
born 1969 (age 57)
wife of Andrés Manuel López Obrador

The most recent first lady to die was Paloma Cordero, widow of Miguel de la Madrid on May 11, 2020.

== See also ==
- List of empresses consort of Mexico
- List of heads of state of Mexico
- Politics of Mexico
