= Angélica Rivera =

Mexican actress, model (born 1969)

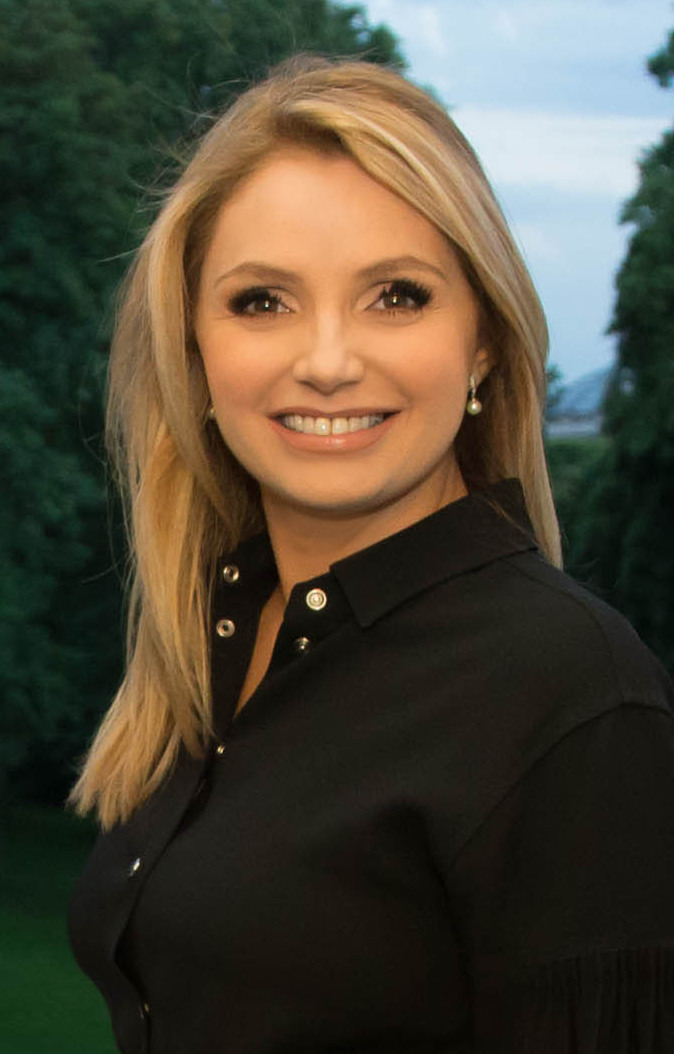

First Lady of Mexico
- In role 1 December 2012 – 30 November 2018
- President: Enrique Peña Nieto
- Preceded by: Margarita Zavala
- Succeeded by: Beatriz Gutiérrez Müller

First Lady of State of Mexico
- In role 27 November 2010 – 15 September 2011
- Governor: Enrique Peña Nieto
- Preceded by: Mónica Pretelini
- Succeeded by: María Irene Dipp

Personal details
- Born: Angélica Rivera Hurtado; 2 August 1969 (age 57) Mexico City, Mexico
- Party: Institutional Revolutionary Party
- Spouses: José Alberto Castro (m. 2004; div. 2008) Enrique Peña Nieto (m. 2010; div. 2019)
- Children: 3, including Sofía Castro
- Occupation: Actress (1988–2007; 2025–present)

Angélica Rivera Hurtado (pronounced [aŋˈxelika riˈβeɾa]; born 2 August 1969) is a Mexican actress who served as the first lady of Mexico from 2012 to 2018, as the second wife of Enrique Peña Nieto, the 64th president of Mexico.

Rivera gained recognition as a television actress, starring in several telenovelas throughout the 1990s and 2000s. Her credits include Alcanzar una estrella II (1991), La dueña (1995), Ángela (1998), Sin pecado concebido (2001), Mariana de la noche (2003), and Destilando amor (2007), a role that earned her the nickname "La Gaviota" ("The Seagull"). She was also part of the short-lived fictional pop group Muñecos de papel.

In 2010, she married Peña Nieto, and held first lady of the State of Mexico from 2010 to 2011, when her husband was governor. As first lady, she presided over the Advisory Council of the National System for Integral Family Development (DIF).

== Early life ==
Rivera was born in the neighborhood of Azcapotzalco, Mexico City and she is the daughter of Manuel Rivera Ruiz, a doctor, and María Eugenia Hurtado Escalante. She has five sisters and a brother. When actress Verónica Castro was filming near where Rivera lived as a young woman, they met and Castro suggested her to compete in "The Face of the Herald", a contest Rivera won in 1987.

== Career ==
=== Early acting and modeling ===
Rivera's career began at the age of 17, when she won The Face of the Herald contest. She was a model in the video Ahora Te Puedes Marchar with Luis Miguel. She then filmed two TV and radio commercials, one for the United States and one for Japan, followed by the TNT video program hosted by Martha Aguayo.

In 1989, Rivera received the opportunity to play a small part in the soap opera Dulce Desafío. This part was followed by many others on shows such as Simplemente Maria, Mi Pequeña Soledad and La Picara Soñadora. In 1991 Rivera was selected to play the scheming and opportunistic Silvana in Alcanzar una estrella II. In 1995, Rivera was chosen to give life to Regina Villarreal in La Dueña; alongside Francisco Gattorno. In 2003 she played a villain Marcia in the telenovela Mariana de la Noche, produced by Salvador Mejía.

In 2007, Rivera had the lead role in the successful and popular novela Destilando amor as Gaviota, a young girl from the country who went to the big city to look for a better life. As a result of her work on this soap, Rivera is frequently referred to in popular media as "La Gaviota".

=== First Lady of Mexico ===
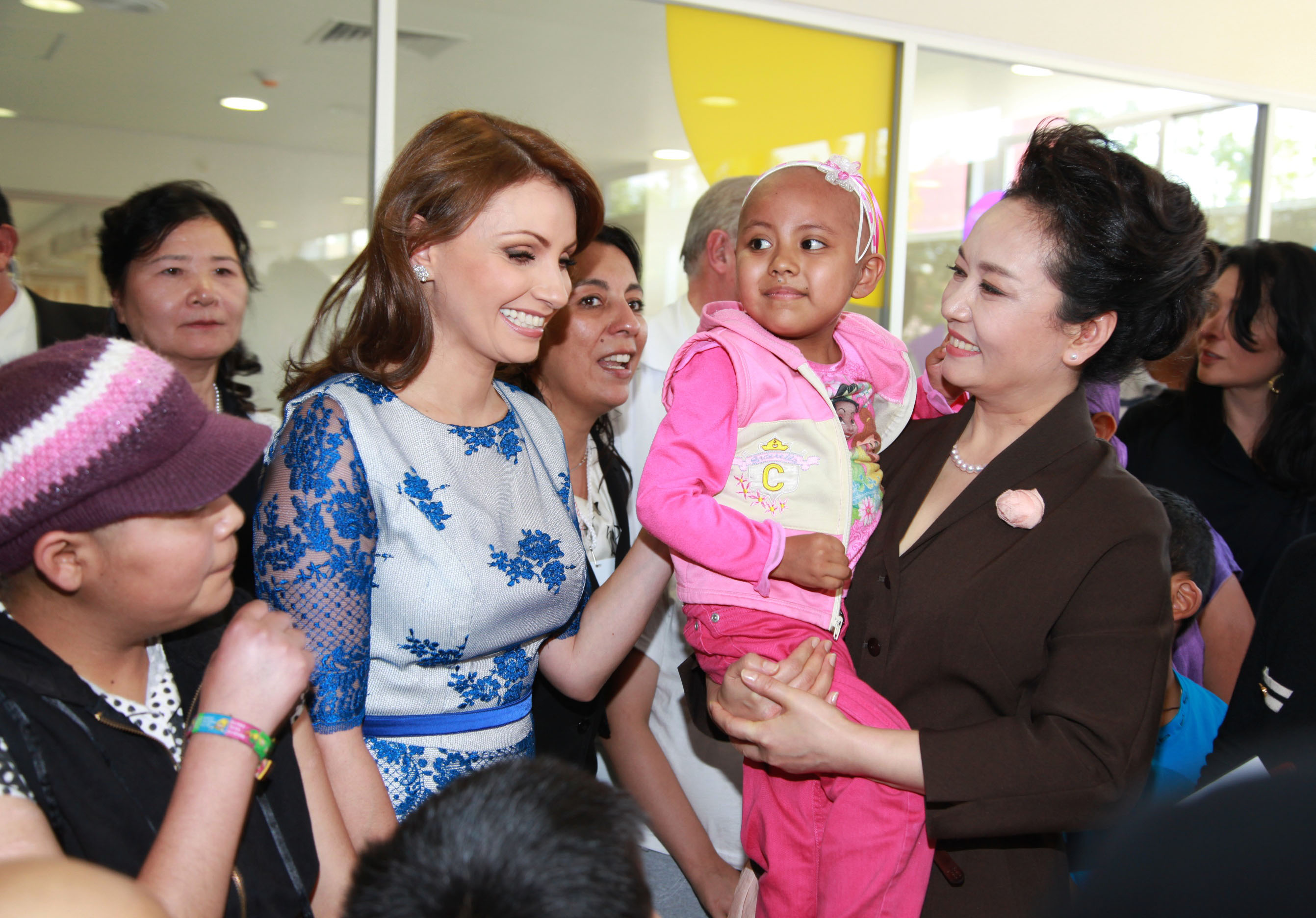
Rivera and Peng Liyuan, the First Lady of China, visit Hospital Infantil de México Federico Gómez, a children's hospital in Mexico City.

As the wife of Enrique Peña Nieto, who was elected President of Mexico from December 2012 through December 2018, Rivera was the First Lady of Mexico. She has also, from March 2013, been President of the Sistema Nacional para el Desarrollo Integral de la Familia, the National System for Integral Family Development, a public institution for the welfare of families in Mexico. In February 2018, she opened the Comprehensive Care Center for Hearing Impairment, EnSeas, which would offer care to 70,000 people annually.

==== House scandal ====
On 9 November 2014, Aristegui Noticias published an article which revealed that a $7 million house in Lomas de Chapultepec owned by Rivera was registered under the name of a company affiliated with a business group that had received government contracts. The revelation about the potential conflict of interest in the acquisition of the house aggravated discontent during the Peña Nieto administration. Days later, Rivera released a video where she detailed her income as a former soap opera actress, stating that she was selling the house and that the property was not under her name because she had not made the full payment yet. The apology was poorly received and became widely criticized across social media. After the incident, Rivera reduced her public media exposure.

== Personal life ==
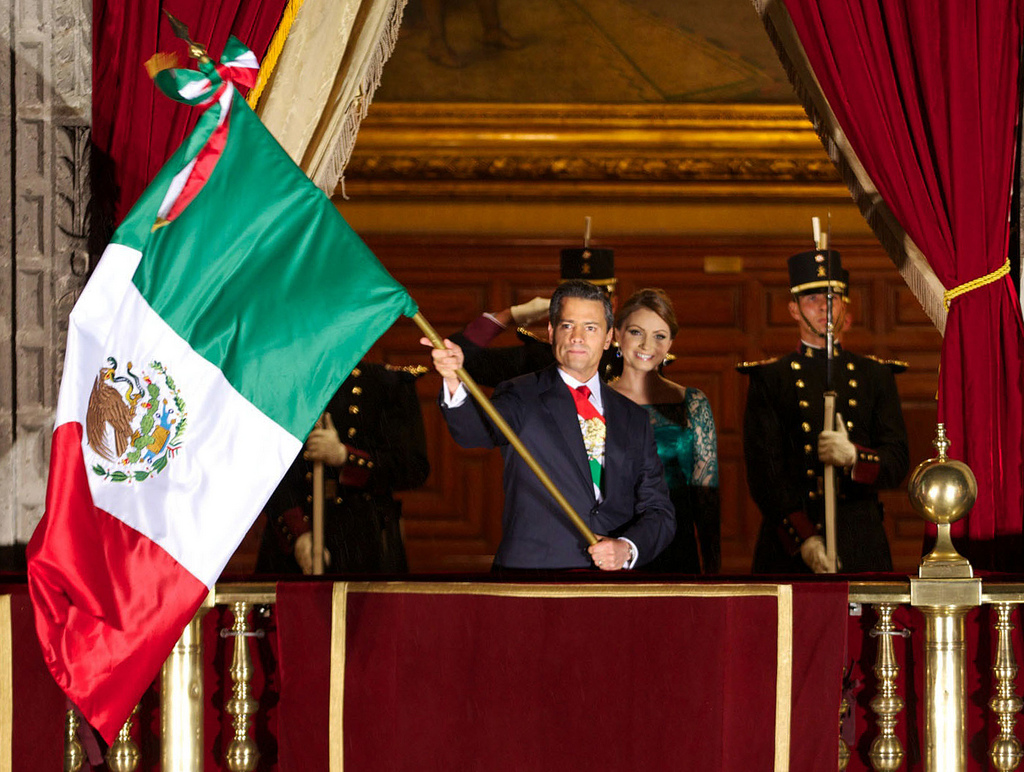
President at the National Palace balcony during the Grito Mexico, D.F. 15 de septiembre de 2013

On 2 December 2004, Rivera was married to producer José Alberto Castro, brother of Verónica Castro, with whom she had three daughters, including Angélica Sofía. The couple divorced in 2008, and their marriage was annulled by the Catholic Church.

Rivera married Enrique Peña Nieto, then Governor of the State of Mexico, on 27 November 2010. Days later, she announced her retirement as an actress to focus on "this great responsibility by his side, dedicated to my home, to my children". From this marriage, she has three stepchildren.

On 30 March 2012, Peña Nieto began his campaign for the presidency, and Rivera accompanied him to the events across the country. She also published a series of videos which she called "What my eyes see, what my heart feels", where she documented the campaign from her point of view.

On 8 February 2019, she announced on social media that she was divorcing Peña Nieto.

== Filmography ==
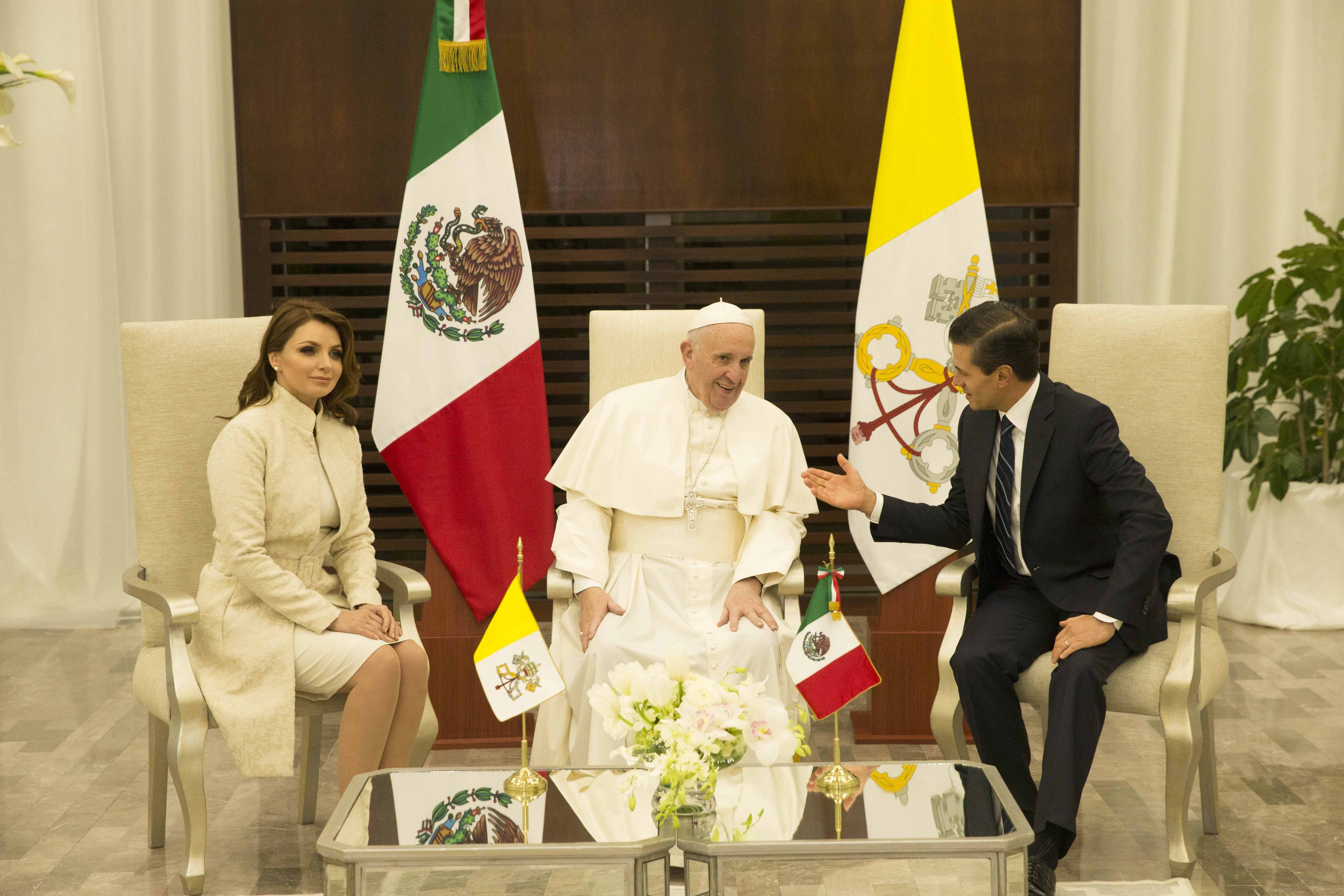
Pope Francis and President Enrique Peña Nieto, accompanied by First Lady Angélica Rivera, held a meeting in the premises of the Presidential hangar following the Pope's arrival in Mexico.

=== Films ===
Year	Title	Role	Notes
1993	¡Aquí espaantan!	Gaby	Film debut

=== Television ===
Year	Title	Role	Notes
1988–89	Dulce desafío	Gina / María Inés	Recurring role
1989	Simplemente María	Isabella de Peñalvert	Recurring role
1990	Mi pequeña Soledad	Marisa	Recurring role
1991	La pícara soñadora	Giovanna Carini	Main role
1991	Alcanzar una estrella II	Silvana Vélez	Main role
1993	Sueño de amor	Isabel González / Érika de la Cruz	Lead role
1995	La dueña	Regina Villareal	Lead role
1997–98	Huracán	Elena	Lead role
1998–99	Ángela	Ángela Bellati Roldán	Lead role
2001	Sin pecado concebido	Mariana Campos Ortiz	Lead role
2003–04	Mariana de la noche	Marcia Montenegro	Main role
2007	Destilando Amor	Teresa Hernández García "Gaviota" / Mariana Franco	Lead role
2025	Con esa misma mirada	Eloísa Obregón de Hidalgo	Lead role

== Honours ==
- Denmark:
  - Dame Grand Cross of the Order of the Dannebrog
- Portugal:
  - Grand Cross of the Order of Prince Henry
- Spain:
  - Grand Cross of the Order of Charles III
  - Dame Grand Cross of the Order of Isabella the Catholic

== See also ==
- List of first ladies of Mexico
- List of heads of state of Mexico
- History of Mexico
- Politics of Mexico

Honorary titles
Preceded by Margarita Zavala	First Lady of Mexico; 2012–2018	Succeeded by Beatriz Gutiérrez Müller
