= Juana Calderón Tapia =

President of Mexico's wife (1822–1897)

Juana Calderón
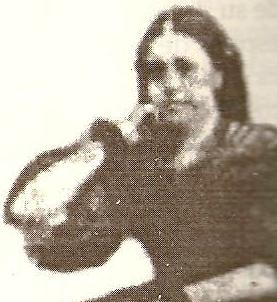

First Lady of Mexico
- In office 31 October 1876 – 28 November 1876
- Preceded by: Margarita Maza
- Succeeded by: Trinidad González

Personal details
- Born: Juana Calderón Tapia; 1822 Puebla, Puebla
- Died: 1897 (aged 74–75) Mexico City
- Party: Liberal
- Spouse(s): José María Iglesias (m.1846-1891)
- Relations: José María Calderón (father) and Josefa Tapia (mother)
- Children: José María, Carlos, Julia and Fernando Iglesias
- Profession: First Lady of Mexico

Juana Calderón y Tapia (1822–1897) was the wife of the Mexican lawyer, professor, journalist and politician José María Iglesias, who was president of Mexico between 1876 and 1877.

== Life ==
Juana Calderón Tapia was born in Puebla in 1822. She was the daughter of José María Tomás Ignacio Calderón Garcés (1780–1834), a military man who was Governor of Puebla on various occasions, and his wife María Josefa de la Luz Tapia Balbuena, originally from Maravatío and who was a sister of the godmother of Melchor Ocampo. She received a good education, which was unusual at the time. She was orphaned at a young age; subsequently, she lived with her maternal grandfather José Simón Tapia, captain of the Provisional Militia and of the Pátzcuaro regiment, in whose house she was taught how to write.

The future president of Mexico, General Pedro María de Anaya, taught her French, which she subsequently learned to read, write, and translate. A very cultured woman, Calderón loved reading; she read books from Mexico, France, and Spain, especially poetry. Calderón married José María Iglesias in May 1849 in Querétaro; the officiating priest at the wedding would soon become Bishop of Tulancingo. Juana focused entirely to his home and to take care to her four children, they had two more but they did not survive to adulthood:

- José María Iglesias Calderón (Mexico City; March 15, 1850)
- Carlos Iglesias Calderón (Mexico City; December 10, 1851)
- Julia Iglesias Calderón (Mexico City; April 27, 1853), she never married.
- Fernando Iglesias Calderón (Mexico City; May 30, 1856 - May 26, 1942), liberal as his father was, when Madero's Revolution won and then the Constitutionalist, he served as senator for the Distrito Federal in 1912 to 1913 and 1920 to 1924, and president of the Liberal Party in 1912. Three times he was offered the post of Secretary of Foreign Affairs (Secretaría de Relaciones Exteriores), a position he declined in the administrations of Francisco I. Madero Venustiano Carranza and Adolfo de la Huerta, who later put him as ambassador in Washington, D.C., where he served until 1923. Fernando Iglesias Calderon also noted as a historian and journalist. He is the author of several books, among them: La traición de Maximiliano y la Capilla Expiatoria; El egoísmo norteamericano durante la Intervención Francesa, y Las supuestas traiciones de Juárez.

His son Fernando Iglesias wrote "Doña Juana said that women form the character of men and not to undermine her husband always agreed with the decision to slaughter him." In her marriage, Calderón endured separations and dangers related to the political career of her husband, who barely spent months as interim president of Mexico. He died in 1891, after which Calderón returned to private life, never going out or receiving visitors and living a modest life. The "woman of agreeable appearance," as she was sometimes described, died peacefully in her home in the year 1897.

== Ancestry table ==
Francisco Calderón
José María Calderón (1780–1834)
Ana María Micaela Garcés
Juana Calderón (1822–1897)
José Simón Tapia
María Josefa Tapia
Alejo Balbuena Figueroa
María Gertrudis Lorenza Balbuena
María Gertrudis Micaela Sánchez Picazo
