= Fernando Iglesias =

Fernando Iglesias may refer to:

- Fernando Iglesias Calderón (1856–1942), Mexican senator and ambassador to the United States.
- Fernando Iglesias 'Tacholas' (1909–1991), Spanish-born, Argentine actor.
- Fernando Iglesias (Argentine politician)
