= Margarita Zavala =

Mexican lawyer and politician

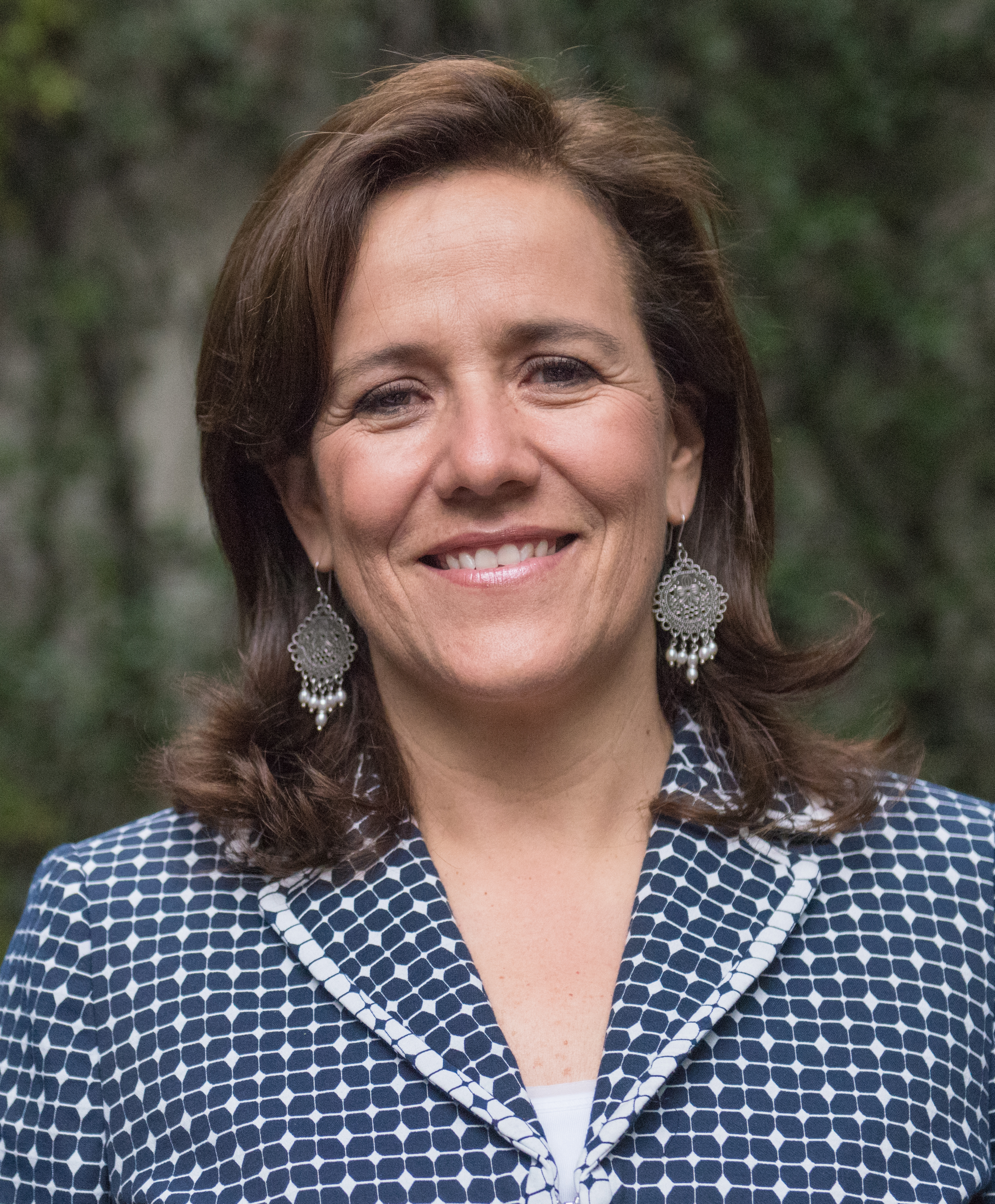
- Zavala in 2018

Member of the Chamber of Deputies for Mexico City's 10th District
- Incumbent
- Assumed office 1 September 2021

Member of the Chamber of Deputies Proportional representation
- In office 1 September 2003 – 31 August 2006

First Lady of Mexico
- In role 1 December 2006 – 30 November 2012
- President: Felipe Calderón
- Preceded by: Marta Sahagún
- Succeeded by: Angélica Rivera

Member of the Legislative Assembly of the Federal District
- In office 15 September 1994 – 14 September 1997

Personal details
- Born: Margarita Ester Zavala Gómez del Campo; 25 July 1967 (age 59) Mexico City, Mexico
- Party: National Action Party
- Spouse: Felipe Calderón (m. 1993)
- Children: 3
- Education: Free School of Law (LLB)
- Website: Official website

Margarita Ester Zavala Gómez del Campo (Spanish pronunciation: [maɾɣaˈɾita saˈβala]; born on 25 July 1967) is a Mexican politician and lawyer. She has served as a member of the Chamber of Deputies representing Mexico City's 10th electoral district since 2021. As the wife of Felipe Calderón, she was the first lady of Mexico from 2006 to 2012. An independent politician, Zavala was a candidate in the 2018 Mexican presidential election, running from 12 October 2017, until withdrawing on 16 May 2018.

== Early life ==
Margarita Zavala was born on 25 July 1967 in Mexico City. She is the fifth of seven siblings: Diego Hildebrando, Mercedes, Pablo, Juan Ignacio, Rafael and Mónica. Her parents, Diego Zavala Pérez and Mercedes Gómez del Campo, were lawyers. Her father was a magistrate in the Tribunal Superior de Justicia del Distrito Federal. She attended the Instituto Asunción, an academy run by nuns. She became a youth leader of the Partido Acción Nacional at age 17. She first met Felipe Calderón in 1984, when both were activists for the PAN party. Zavala studied law at the Escuela Libre de Derecho, where she graduated with a 9.5 (out of ten) grade point average. Her thesis, La Comisión Nacional de Derechos Humanos: antecedentes, estructura y propuestas, was on the National Human Rights Commission.

== Career ==
Zavala worked for the private law firms Estrada, González y de Ovendo and Sodi y Asociados. Zavala was a Deputy of the Legislative Assembly of the Federal District between 15 September 1994 and 14 September 1997. Zavala was a professor at the Universidad Iberoamericana (1991-1992) and also taught law at the Instituto Asunción (1990 to 1999), her high-school alma mater. Zavala is a regular op-ed contributor to El Universal.

=== National Action Party leadership roles ===
Zavala has been a national councilor for the National Action Party (PAN) since 1991, and was the PAN's Legal Director of the National Executive Committee from 1993 to 1994. In 1995, she was a Mexican delegate to the Fourth World Conference on Women. Zavala was named by Luis Felipe Bravo Mena to head the Secretaria de Promoción Política de la Mujer, which is the party's office for the promotion of the participation of women in politics, serving from 1999 to 2003. During her four years as head, the proportion of female PAN federal deputies increased from 19% to 32%, the largest of any political party.

She was part of the transition team of Vicente Fox, advising on women's issues. She was a founding member of the Junta de Gobierno del Instituto Nacional de las Mujeres (2001), which is the government office that works toward gender equality and elimination of discrimination and violence against women.

=== Chamber of Deputies ===
Zavala was elected to the Chamber of Deputies in 2003, as part of the LIX Legislature of the Mexican Congress. She was nominated through the National Action Party's list under the principle of proportional representation. She served on three Chamber of Deputies commissions: Commission on Labor and Social Security (2003–06), Commission on Justice and Human Rights (2003–06), Commission on National Defense (2003–06). She was also a member on the Law Studies and Parliamentary Investigations Center Committee (2004–06). Additionally, she served as Sub-Coordinator of Social Politics of PAN's Parliamentary Group. Zavala resigned in April 2006 to campaign for her husband's 2006 bid for the Mexican presidency.

=== First Lady of Mexico ===
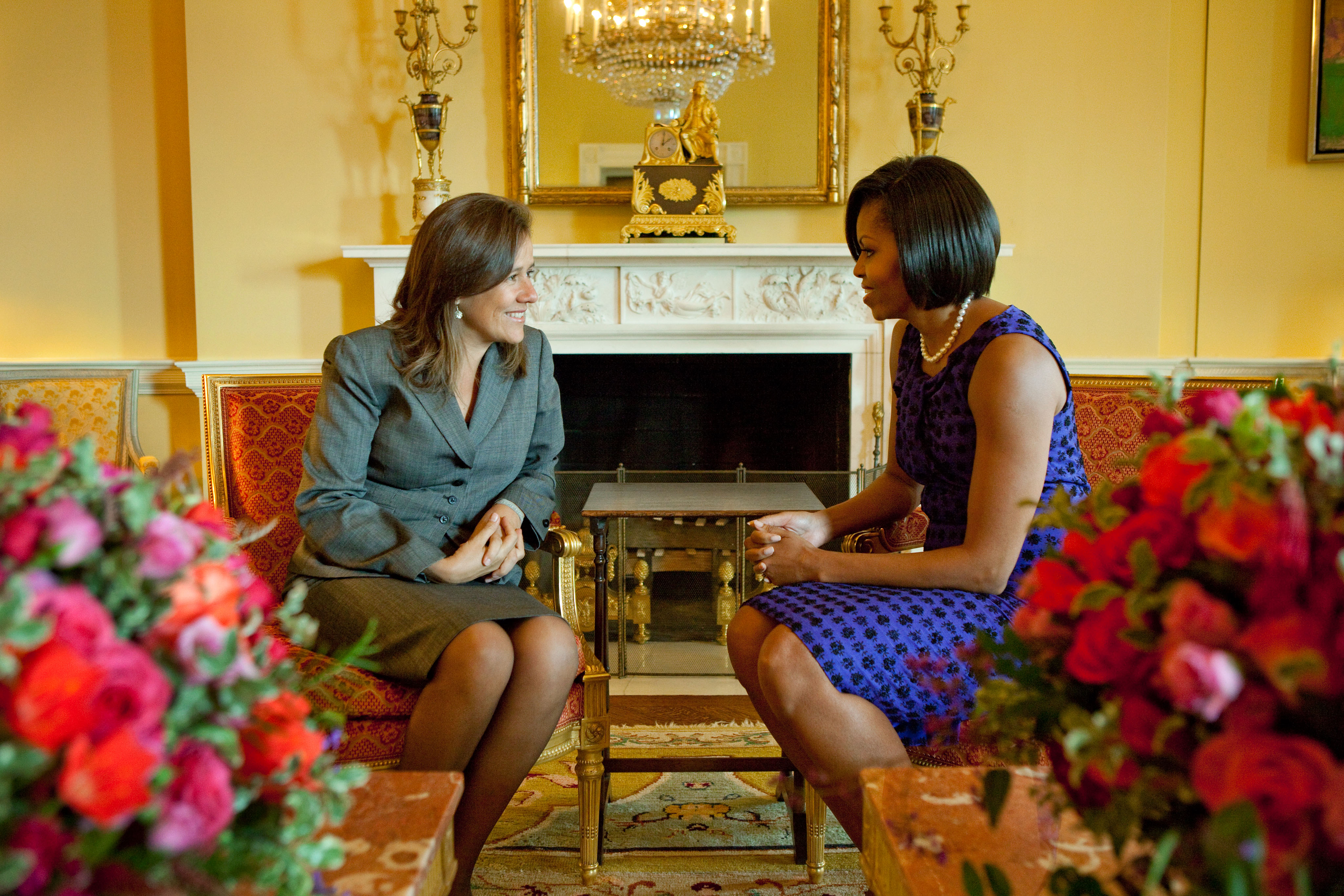
First Lady Zavala with First Lady of the United States Michelle Obama in the Yellow Oval Room, February 2010.

Margarita's primary objective in the changing Mexican government was to help her newly elected husband run the educational programs throughout the country.

As the wife of Felipe Calderón, President of Mexico during 2006-2012, Margarita Zavala was considered "First Lady" although such function is not defined by the legal framework. She is the only First Lady to have served in Congress, although she served as non-elected member through a position defined as plurinominal by the Mexican law. She served as president of the civic advisory board to the Desarrollo Integral de la Familia, a government agency that promotes child and family development.

She supported organizations that fight drug addiction and others that help migrant children returning from the United States. Zavala became a pledged organ and tissue donor upon death in 2009 to help promote organ donation in Mexico. She launched an anti-addiction program called Nueva Vida, which planned to have 310 centers nationwide as of 2011. Zavala continued to hold influence in the PAN, with the election of Gustavo Madero Muñoz for PAN presidency cited as an example of her lobbying.

During her husband's administration her family was involved in corruption scandals, including a privately run, publicly funded day care facility in Hermosillo, Mexico, which caught fire on June 5, 2009, resulting in the death of 49 children. It later became known that the facility never met safety standards, and among the owners was Marcia Matilde Altagracia Gómez del Campo Tonella, a cousin of the first lady. Though she was not found guilty by a jury, many people question a possible interference from the executive branch of the government given the family ties.

Moreover, her brother's company, Diego Hildebrando Zavala, was awarded some public contracts both during the administration of Felipe Calderón, and before when he was Secretary of Energy, an issue which some Corruption Watch organizations point out as evidence of conflicts of interest from the former president.

Her cousin Luis Felipe Zavala MacGregor was murdered in gang-related violence.

Mariana Gomez del Campo, another cousin of her, became president of the National Action Party of Mexico City amid allegations of electoral fraud by other party members. They also accused her of misappropriation of public money from the party's budget, and nepotism as she appointed her own sister, Teresa Gomez del Campo to the local Mexican Youth Institute, known by its acronym in Spanish IMJUVE with a monthly salary of $28,125 pesos which is almost the double of an average salary in Mexico City.

=== Post-Calderón presidency ===
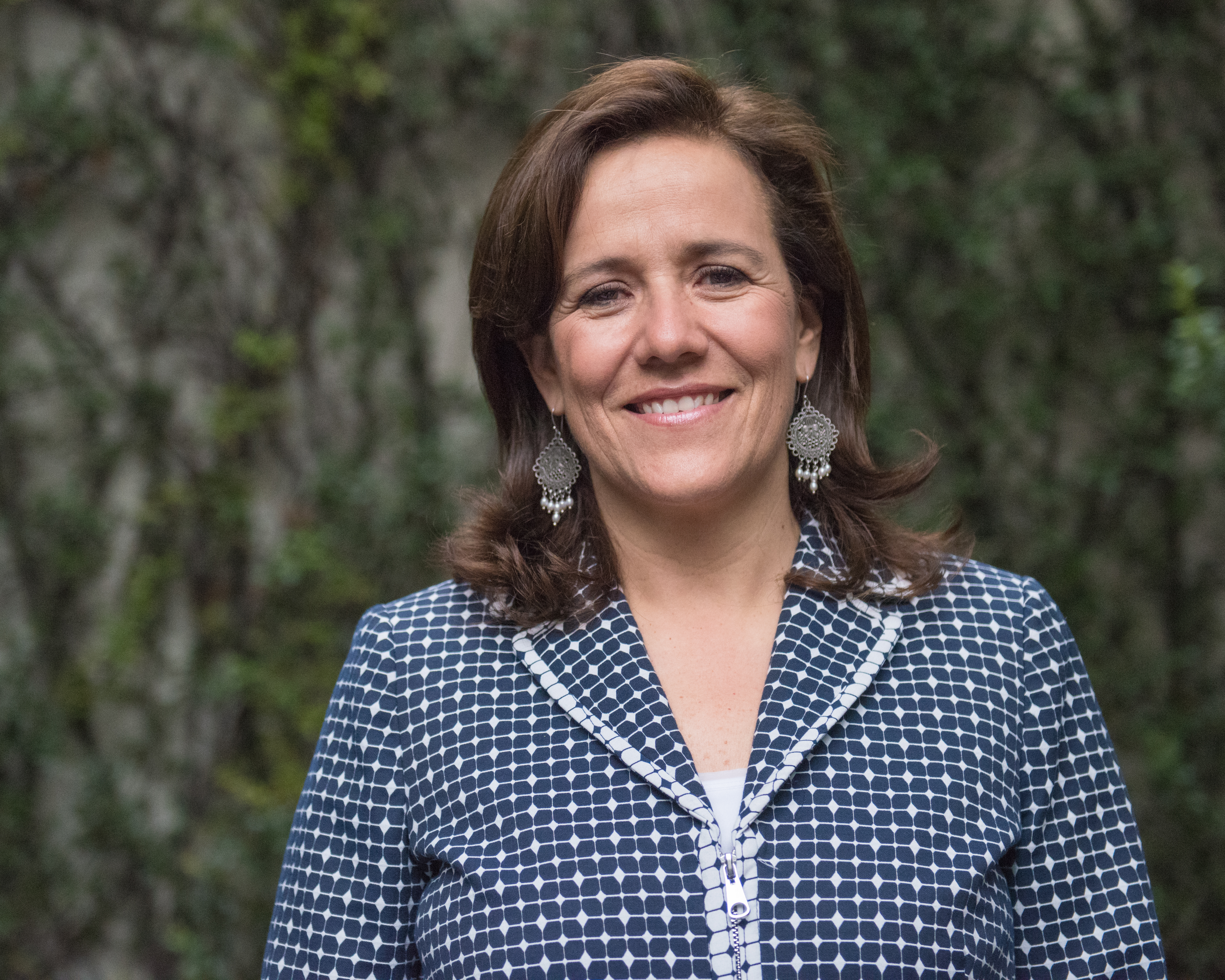
During the LIX Legislature.

Speculations surrounding Zavala's political career began after her husband's presidency ended. She was eyed as the possible leader of the National Action Party, as well as a potential presidential candidate in 2018, though in 2013 she declined both.

In September 2014, after two years as private citizen, Zavala revealed her intentions of becoming a candidate for the Chamber of Deputies. In January 2015, Zavala formally registered as a pre-candidate for a term as a Federal Deputy, through the means of proportional representation in the fourth electoral region, stating that Mexico required a Congress capable of balancing power. She was backed by several members of her party, including former presidential candidate Josefina Vázquez Mota. However, she was left out of the first 15 places in the PAN's national list, significantly reducing her chances of winning a position in Congress.

A day later, she announced that she would seek the presidency of the PAN, stating that the party needed to change. In February, however, she left open the possibility of running for president in 2018.

Zavala campaigned for various PAN candidates at municipal and state levels during the 2013, 2015, 2016 and 2017 election cycles.

=== 2018 presidential campaign ===
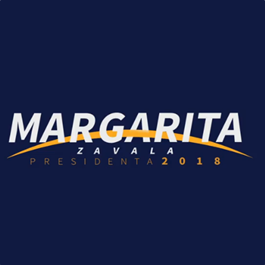
Campaign logo.

On 14 June 2015, Zavala released a video announcing her desire to run as a presidential candidate in 2018.

While attending the Guadalajara International Book Fair, she was asked for the three books that impacted her life (commonly asked to presidential candidates), to which she answered: the Bible, The Price of My Soul by Bernadette Devlin and Caudillos culturales en la Revolución Mexicana by Enrique Krauze.

Zavala was consistently the front runner in polls among likely PAN presidential candidates between March 2016 and April 2017. She released her 3de3 financial records in December 2016.

On 16 May 2018, Zavala publicly withdrew her name from the ticket, ending her presidential campaign.

== Political stances ==
Zavala was a proponent for constitutional amendments that would have allowed politicians to seek reelection. Congress members were allowed to seek reelection since 2014 (four terms for the lower house and two for the upper house, total of 12 years, while the president remains limited to one term).

Zavala opposes abortion; with her only political declaration during her time as First Lady being the condemnation of the legalization of abortion in Mexico City.

Following the Supreme Court's June 2015 declaration of state laws defining marriage as unconstitutional, Zavala was asked her stance on the matter in an interview on Al Punto to which she responded: the Court has been clear on same-sex marriage, including on a previous challenge to Mexico City's civil code, various resolutions make it jurisprudence and "I do not have any problem". However, during an event in which she was collecting signatures for her independent candidacy, a lesbian couple with children approached her, while they were recorded, they introduced themselves to her and, as the recording shows, Zavala's immediate reaction was of shock followed by instructing the person recording to put it off saying "this is something different", then she turned again at the couple and told them "I believe..." and the recording ends abruptly. She was criticized by the media, and was asked again to clarify her position on same-sex marriage which caused her to say she regretted having done that.

== Personal life ==
After six years of dating, she married Felipe Calderón in January 1993. They have three children: María (born 1997), Luis Felipe (born 1999) and Juan Pablo (born 2003).

Zavala is a Roman Catholic.

On 13 June 2012, Zavala underwent surgery in her right eye to avoid retinal detachment from an injury; she was submitted to emergency surgery following a retinal detachment on 18 October 2016.

== Public image ==
Zavala became known for wearing rebozos, a traditional shawl. Her austere personality during her time as First Lady was contrasted with the frequently outspoken Marta Sahagún. Zavala's political discreteness was seen as intentional to avoid the scrutiny Sahagún received for her prominence in the Fox administration.

== Honours ==
- Denmark:
  - Dame Grand Cross of the Order of the Dannebrog
- Spain:
  - Dame Grand Cross of the Order of Isabella the Catholic

== See also ==
- List of first ladies of Mexico
- List of heads of state of Mexico
- History of Mexico
- Politics of Mexico

Honorary titles
Preceded by Marta Sahagún	First Lady of Mexico; 2006–2012	Succeeded by Angélica Rivera
