= Josefa Dávila =

First Lady of Mexico (1801–1844)

First Lady of Mexico
- In office 7 September 1843 – 22 January 1844
- Preceded by: Inés García de López de Santa Anna
- Succeeded by: Dolores Tosta

Personal details
- Born: 20 January 1801 Tlaxcala, Viceroyalty of New Spain
- Died: 22 January 1844 (aged 43) Mexico City, Mexico
- Spouse: Valentín Canalizo

María Josefa Benita Dávila Ortega (20 January 1801 – 22 January 1844) was the wife of the twelfth President of Mexico, Valentín Canalizo she served as First Lady of Mexico for a few months between 1843 and 1844.

== Biography ==
Dávila was born in Tlaxcala City on Tuesday, 20 January 1801, the daughter of José Manuel Dávila and Teresa Ortega. On 30 November 1826, she married Valentín Canalizo in the Metropolitan Tabernacle of Puebla, a union from which Antonio (1828–1893) and Vicente Leocadio Canalizo Dávila (1832) were born. Dávila was by her husband's side in his successes and failures; she accompanied him to the capital when he took office as Substitute President (1843–44). A few months after Canalizo assumed her first term as Chief Executive and she as First Lady, Dávila became seriously ill and died in her private residence on Calle de Montealegre on 22 January 1844. Her body was transferred to the National Palace, where the people came to bid her last respects. Then a retinue, chaired by her husband, carried the coffin to the Los Angeles pantheon. As the wife of the acting president, she was buried with great pomp. Just two days before her death, she Josefa had just turned forty-three years of age. Her death was a severe blow to Canalizo, who would never remarry and survived her for six years.
