= Fernando Iglesias Calderón =

Mexican politician and diplomat (1856–1942)

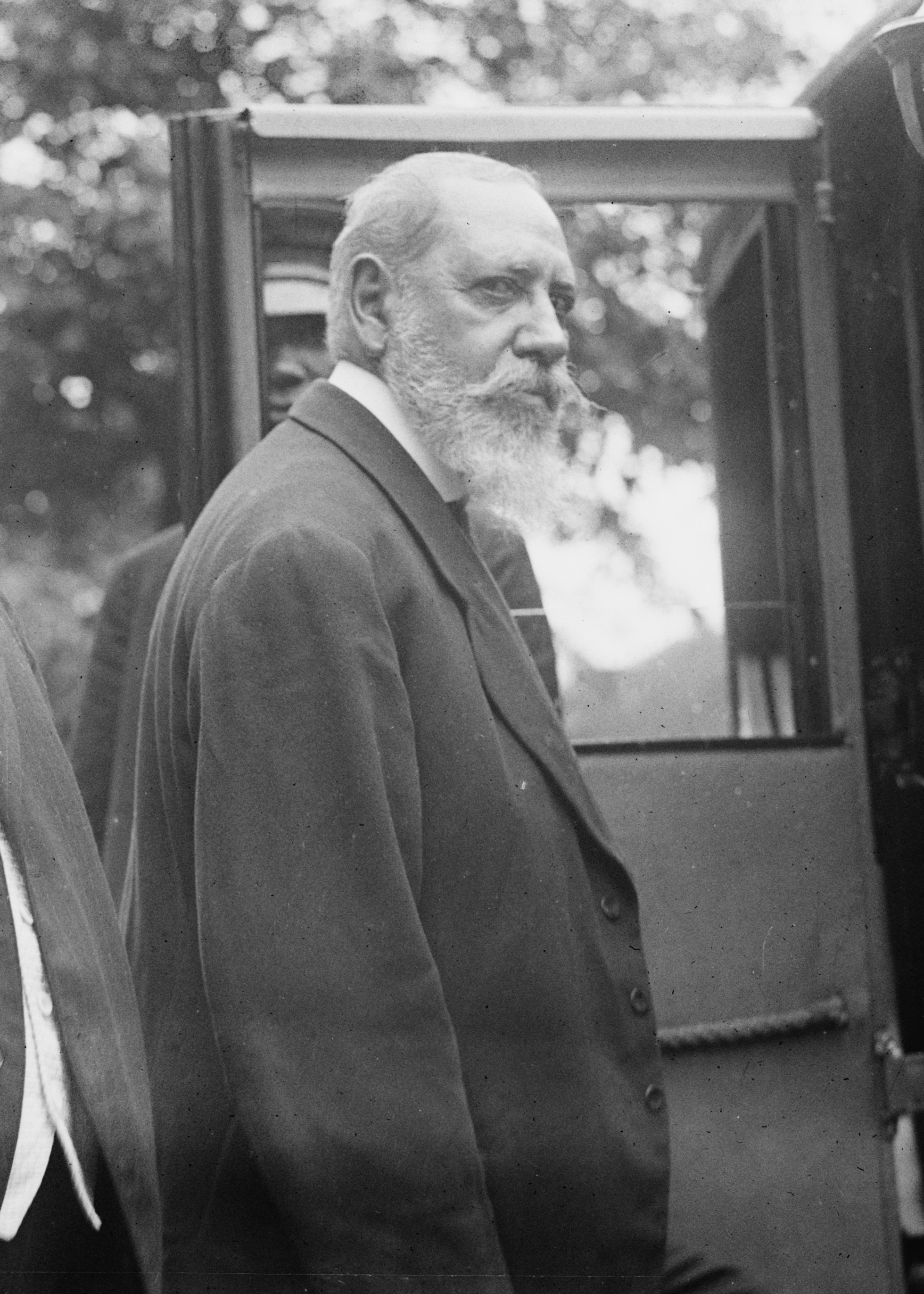
- Iglesias in Washington, D.C., on 30 June 1920.

Senator of Mexico
- In office 1920–1924
- In office 1912–1913

Ambassador of Mexico to the United States
- In office 19 July 1920 – 31 October 1920
- Preceded by: Ignacio Bonillas
- Succeeded by: Eliseo Arredondo

Personal details
- Born: 30 May 1856 Mexico City
- Died: 26 May 1942 (aged 85) Tacubaya, Mexico City
- Party: Liberal Party
- Parent(s): José María Iglesias and Juana Calderón Tapia
- Education: National School of Jurisprudence

Fernando Iglesias Calderón (30 May 1856 – 26 May 1942) was a Mexican liberal politician and diplomat who served as president of the extinct Liberal Party (1912–1915), represented Mexico City in the Senate (1912–1913 and 1920–1924) and, for three months, served as ambassador of Mexico to the United States (1920).

Beside his political and diplomatic careers, he was also a writer and historian who inherited the military archive of Mariano Escobedo and authored several titles in a collection called Rectificaciones históricas (Historical Rectifications).

== Biography ==
Iglesias was born in Mexico City on 30 May 1856. His father, José María Iglesias, served as interim president of Mexico during the autumn of 1876. His mother, Juana Calderón Tapia, was a daughter of José María Calderón, who served several times as governor of Puebla.

Iglesias attended both the National Preparatory School (1869–1874) and the National School of Jurisprudence (1874–1876). He began his professional career as a teacher of his preparatory school, but soon started a career in politics opposing dictator Porfirio Díaz, who had forced his father out of the presidency.

In 1910, he competed against Francisco I. Madero for the joint presidential candidacy of the Anti-Reelectionist Party and the National Democratic Party, but ended up in third place. Once Madero assumed the presidency, he invited Iglesias to the cabinet as secretary of Foreign Affairs, but he declined. A year later, he was elected president of the Liberal Party and represented Mexico City in the senate from 1912 to 1913.

After the 1913 coup d'état, Iglesias opposed General Victoriano Huerta and was imprisoned in San Juan de Ulúa. When Venustiano Carranza defeated Huerta, Iglesias received a second invitation to the cabinet as secretary of Foreign Affairs, but he declined it once again, the same in the revolutionary cabinet of Eulalio Gutiérrez on 10 November 1914 and would reject it for the fourth time during the administration of President Adolfo de la Huerta. He did, however, accept the post of High Commissioner of Mexico (with the rank of ambassador) in Washington, D.C., which he briefly held from July 19 to October 31, 1920.

Back in Mexico, Iglesias supported President Álvaro Obregón and was elected to the Senate for a second term (1920–1924). Two years after the end of his term, he was appointed Mexican arbiter on the Mexican-German Claims Commission (1926–1931).

Iglesias died unmarried in Tacubaya, Mexico City, on 26 May 1942 at the age of 85. He was distinguished as Commander of the Order of Merit by the government of Chile.

== Works ==
- Un libro del ministro de Guerra, el general Bernardo Reyes: Errores múltiples y omisiones extrañas (1901)
- La traición de Maximiliano y la capilla propiciatoria (1902)
- El egoísmo norteamericano durante la Intervención Francesa (1905)
- Tras campañas nacionales y una crítica falaz (1906)
- Las supuestas traiciones de Juárez (1907)
