= Olivia Trujillo =

- Born: 1962 or 1963; Mexico City
- Occupation: Seamstress
- Notable work: Inauguration dress of Claudia Sheinbaum, Wedding Dress of Claudia Sheinbaum

Olivia Trujillo Cortés is a Mexican seamstress whose most notable client is President of Mexico Claudia Sheinbaum. She made the dresses Sheinbaum wore for her inauguration, her wedding to Jesús María Tarriba and the 2026 FIFA World Cup draw.

== Early life ==
Trujillo was born into a working-class family in Mexico City in 1962 or 1963. She states that her family was numerous and very poor, and her mother used to make all the children's clothes. She began sewing at the age of 12, secretly using her mother's sewing machine without her permission. As a teenager and young woman, she worked as a machinist in clothing factories.

== Career ==
Trujillo's career as a dress designer and seamstress began in the mid-1980s. Sheinbaum first heard of Trujillo by word of mouth when she was mayor of Mexico City, and sent Trujillo a suit to obtain measurements, some fabrics and instructions on the styles she preferred. Her first commission for the future president was completed in 2022.

During Sheinbaum's presidential campaign, Trujillo's designs began to incorporate indigenous fabrics and motifs, a feature which would later characterise the President's style.

Trujillo made the dress which Sheinbaum wore for her inauguration in 2024, which was pearl-white with flowers embroidered on the lower right section of the dress by Zapotec embroiderer Claudia Vásquez Aquino. The majority of the dress was left plain to highlight the presidential sash of office.

Another of Trujillo's creations was the wedding dress Sheinbaum wore at her marriage to Jesús María Tarriba. The dress was made from traditional Mexican smoothed cotton with embroidered lace from neck to hem.

Sheinbaum's use of indigenous motifs and original style led the New York Times to name her one of the 67 most stylish people in the world in 2025. The president would mention Trujillo's contribution to her look in the New York Times article that accompanied the list.

The dress Sheinbaum wore to the 2026 Fifa World Cup Draw, co-hosted by Mexico, was another one of Trujillo's designs.

Trujillo operates from a workshop in the San Pedro Martir area of the city.

=== Relationship to Sheinbaum ===
Trujillo has met Sheinbaum to take measurements for her dresses, and expresses her admiration for the president. She votes for Sheinbaum and her party Morena.

She has expressed her concern that the President does not require a final measurement and adjustments to the completed garments she is sent, and was especially surprised that Sheinbaum did not require a final fitting for her wedding dress. However, she recognised the President was a busy woman.

Trujillo describes Sheinbaum as a "humble president", and she feels proud to be able to bring what she can to the President's team.
