= María Esther Zuno =

First Lady of Mexico from 1970 to 1976

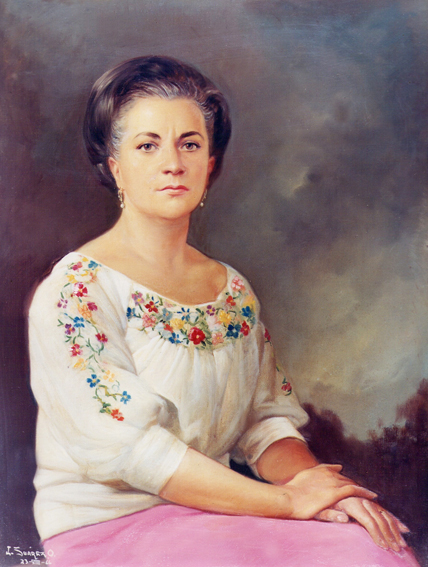

First Lady of Mexico
- In office 1 December 1970 – 30 November 1976
- President: Luis Echeverría
- Preceded by: Guadalupe Borja
- Succeeded by: Carmen Romano

Personal details
- Born: María Esther Zuno Arce; 8 December 1924 Guadalajara, Jalisco, Mexico
- Died: 4 December 1999 (aged 74) Mexico City, Mexico
- Spouse: Luis Echeverría (m. 1945)
- Children: 8

María Esther Zuno Arce (8 December 1924 – 4 December 1999) was the wife of Mexican President Luis Echeverría and the first lady of Mexico from 1970 to 1976. She refused to adopt the standard title of primera dama (first lady), preferring to be called compañera (meaning partner, companion, or comrade). She was known for her efforts to support women's rights and social welfare in Mexico.

== Early life ==
María Esther Zuno Arce was born in Guadalajara, Jalisco, on December 8, 1924. She was the third of twelve children born to Carmen Arce, a homemaker, and José Guadalupe Zuno, a former governor of Jalisco. Reportedly, her birth certificate was signed by ex-president Álvaro Obregón, as well as future presidents Lázaro Cárdenas and Manuel Ávila Camacho.

== Marriage and family ==
Zuno met Luis Echeverría at the home of the artists Diego Rivera and Frida Kahlo, with whom they were friends. The couple's social circle also included the artists David Alfaro Siqueiros and José Clemente Orozco. After a five-year engagement, Zuno and Echeverría, a law student at the time, were married on 2 January 1945. The groom's friend José López Portillo, a future president of Mexico, served as their witness.

The couple had eight children: Luis Vicente, María del Carmen, Álvaro, María Esther, Rodolfo, Pablo, Benito, and Adolfo.

== First lady of Mexico ==
For 1970 to 1976, Zuno served as first lady during the presidency of her husband, Luis Echeverría. She rejected the title of primera dama (first lady), preferring to be called compañera. In this period, she undertook an intense endeavor to improve social welfare in the country, described by some as the greatest degree of involvement of a Mexican first lady since the time of Eva Sámano, the wife of President Adolfo López Mateos. Her work as first lady included not only social welfare but also promoting women's rights and Mexican folkloric tradition.

Zuno argued that it was not possible to support children without supporting the entire family, with the mother at its center. She asserted that women must not only receive assistance but also participate directly in the resolution of the problems facing their families and their communities. She implemented family counseling programs, primarily in communities with fewer than 2,500 residents that otherwise had little access to federal services. Other initiatives focused on literacy, women in politics, and midwifery. Overall she promoted 23 social programs, including home construction, orchards, reforestation, drug dependence prevention, mental health care, special education, sports, and job training.

While her husband was in office, she accompanied him on foreign trips and made various visits on her own. She often wore Mexican traditional blouses or cotton dresses rather than more formal clothing on these and other occasions.

== Later years and death ==
After her husband left office, Zuno retreated from public life. She died in Mexico City in 1999, just days before her 75th birthday, of complications from diabetes.
