= Alejo Bay =

Mexican politician

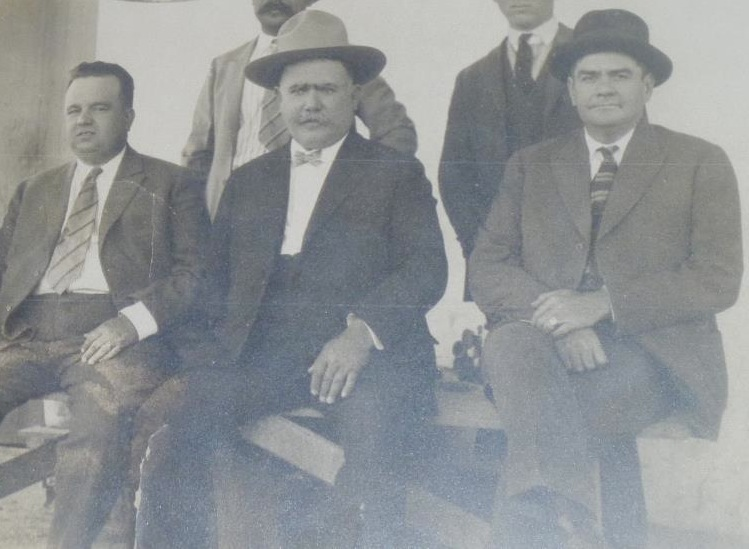
- Alejo Bay, Alvaro Obregon and Plutarco Elias Calles time after the Battle of Agua Prieta

4th Governor of Sonora
- In office 1923–1927
- Preceded by: Adolfo de la Huerta
- Succeeded by: Fausto Topete

Personal details
- Born: 1891 Álamos, Sonora, Mexico
- Died: January 30, 1952 (aged 60–61) Rochester, Minnesota, U.S.
- Party: Great Sonoran Civil Party
- Parent: Thomas Bay

Alejo Bay (1891 – January 30, 1952) was a Mexican political leader.

== Early life ==
Bay was born in Álamos, Sonora. His father was Thomas Bay, a Confederate soldier from St. Louis, Missouri, that went to live in Alamos after The Union won the war. His grandfather was Samuel M. Bay, an American lawyer who represented Dred Scott in the 1847 Scott v. Emerson case.

== Political career ==
Don Alejo Bay figured during a long time in political and federal issues in the Mexican state of Sonora. Alejo Bay was two times federal deputy, senator of the republic, local deputy and governor of Sonora during the Constitutional period from 1923 to 1927. He was also the Secretary of Treasury during 1939, under the command of general Macias Valenzuela. He was good friends with President Álvaro Obregón. During 1920, as a senator, he joined a group that was led by generals Jose Gonzalo Escobar and Fausto Topete, against president Plutarco Elias Calles for betraying his comrade Alvaro Obregon which caused him to march in the desert for five years.

== Death ==
Alejo Bay died January 30, 1952, in Rochester, Minnesota, United States.

== Sources ==
- (in Spanish) States
