= Guadalupe Borja =

First Lady of Mexico (1915–1974)

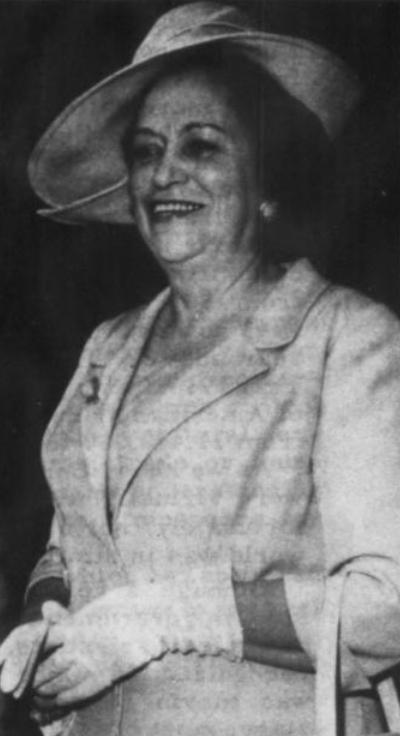
- Guadalupe Borja, from a 1966 publication of the US Department of State

First Lady of Mexico
- In role December 1, 1964 – November 30, 1970
- President: Gustavo Díaz Ordaz
- Preceded by: Eva Sámano
- Succeeded by: María Esther Zuno

Personal details
- Born: Guadalupe Borja Osorno; April 4, 1915 Mexico City
- Died: July 19, 1974 (aged 59) Mexico City
- Party: Institutional Revolutionary Party
- Spouse: Gustavo Díaz Ordaz (m. 1937)
- Profession: Secretary

Guadalupe Borja Osorno (April 4, 1915 – July 19, 1974) was First Lady of Mexico from 1964 to 1970. She was the wife of Mexican president Gustavo Díaz Ordaz.

== See also ==
- List of first ladies of Mexico
- Politics of Mexico

Honorary titles
Preceded by Eva Sámano de López	First Lady of Mexico; 1964–1970	Succeeded by María Esther Zuno de Echeverría
