= María Izaguirre =

Mexican politician

María de los Dolores Izaguirre Castañares, married name María Dolores Izaguirre de Ruiz, (11 November 1891 – 18 January 1979) was the First Lady of Mexico during the years 1952–1958 when her husband Adolfo Ruiz Cortines was President.

Her marriage to Ruiz Cortines was her third marriage, in 1941, although they had known each other since adolescence. They separated in the late 1960s after he had left office, and he died in 1973.

Honorary titles
Preceded by Beatriz Velasco de Alemán	First Lady of Mexico; 1952-1958	Succeeded by Eva Sámano de López
