= Sueño de amor (1993 TV series) =

Mexican telenovela

- Genre: Telenovela
- Written by: Susan Crowley; Gabriela Ortigoza
- Directed by: Jorge Miguel Valdés; José Rendón
- Starring: Omar Fierro; Angélica Rivera
- Theme music composer: Jorge Avendaño
- Opening theme: "Sueño de amor" by Franz Liszt
- Country of origin: Mexico
- Original language: Spanish
- No. of episodes: 70

Production
- Executive producer: José Rendón
- Producers: Roberto Hernández Vázquez; Víctor Manuel Ceballos
- Cinematography: Miguel Ángel Medina; José Guadalupe Soriano

Original release
- Network: Canal de las Estrellas; Univision
- Release: May 17 – August 20, 1993

Sueño de amor, is a Mexican telenovela produced by José Rendón for Televisa in 1993. It is based on the radionovela La gata, original of Inés Rodena.

Omar Fierro and Angélica Rivera star as the main protagonists, while Cynthia Klitbo and Fernando Luján tar as the main antagonists.

== Cast ==
- Angélica Rivera as Isabel González Hernández / Erika de la Cruz
- Omar Fierro as Antonio Montenegro
- Sergio Basañez as Mauricio Montenegro
- Fernando Luján as Ernesto Montenegro
- Cynthia Klitbo as Ana Luisa Montenegro
- Guillermo Zarur as Nacho
- Malena Doria as Aurelia Reyes de Hernández
- Tony Carbajal as Anselmo Hernández
- Tony Bravo as Carlo Lombardo
- Héctor Suárez Gomis as Poncho
- María Fernanda García as Ligia Escalante
- Meche Barba as Teresa
- Rosángela Balbó as Marcela
- Bruno Bichir as Franco Giordano
- Eugenio Cobo as Federico
- Laura Martí as Nora "La Chikis"
- Rafael Banquells as Manuel
- Fidel Garriga as Adrián
- María Prado as María
- Francisco Avendaño as Armando
- Isabella Tena
