= Beatriz Gutiérrez Müller =

First Lady of Mexico from 2018 to 2024

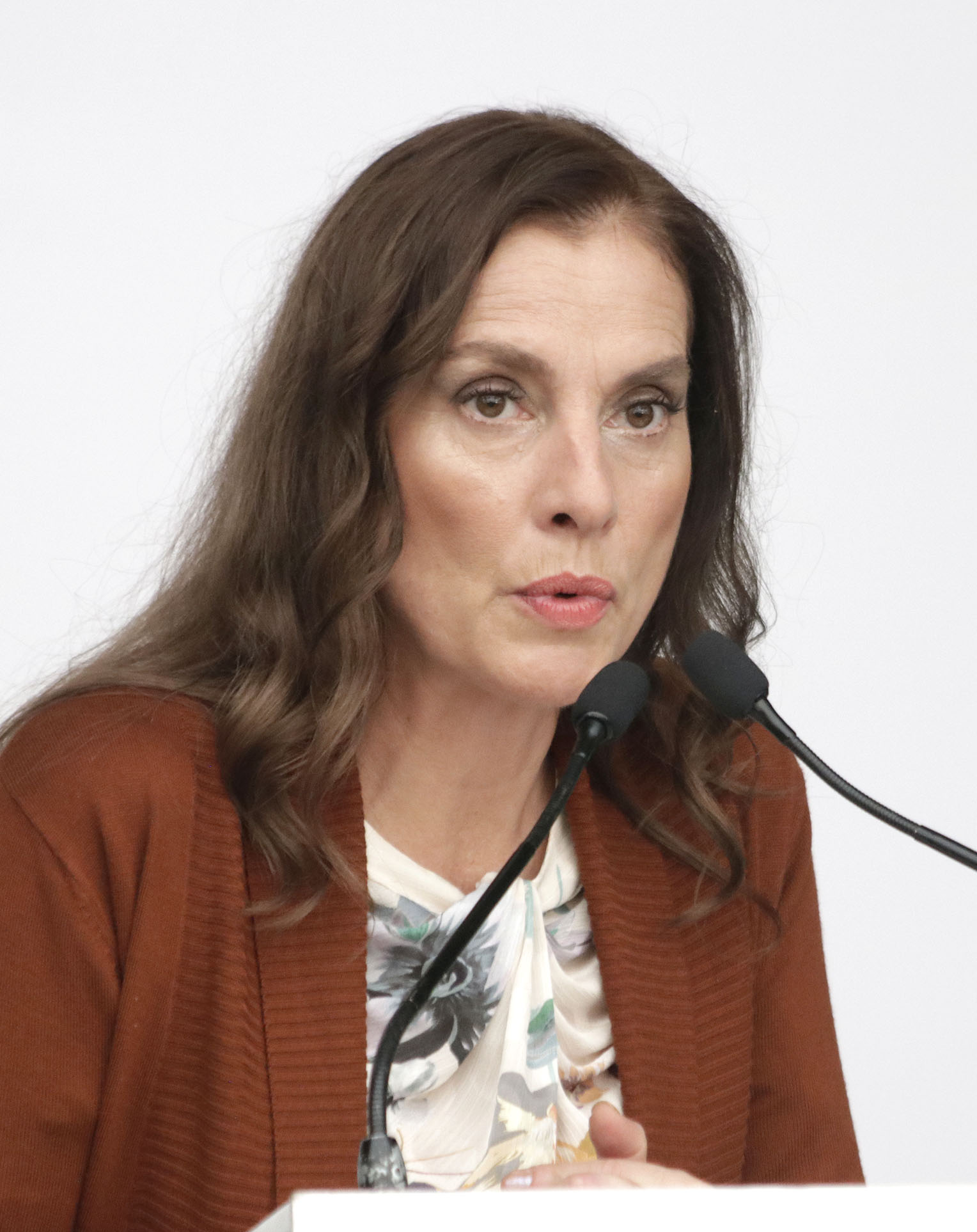
- Gutiérrez Müller in 2019

First Lady of Mexico
- In role 1 December 2018 – 30 September 2024
- President: Andrés Manuel López Obrador
- Preceded by: Angélica Rivera
- Succeeded by: Jesús María Tarriba (as First Gentleman)

Personal details
- Born: 13 January 1969 (age 57) Mexico City, Mexico
- Party: National Regeneration Movement
- Spouse: Andrés Manuel López Obrador (m. 2006)
- Children: 1
- Education: Ibero-American University Puebla (BA, MA)
- Occupation: Writer, journalist, researcher

Beatriz Gutiérrez Müller (sometimes spelled Mueller; born 13 January 1969) is a Mexican writer, journalist, researcher, and the wife of the 65th president of Mexico, Andrés Manuel López Obrador.

== Early life and education ==
Gutiérrez Müller was born in Mexico City, the daughter of Juan Gutiérrez Canet and Nora Beatriz Müller Bentjerodt, a German Chilean. She graduated with a bachelor's degree in communications from the Ibero-American University Puebla in 1998, with her thesis Regulación del uso de los medios de comunicación en leyes electorales federales (Regulation of the use of the media in federal electoral laws). She also graduated with a master's degree from the same university in 2002 with her thesis El arte de la memoria en la Historia verdadera de la conquista de la Nueva España (The art of the memory in the True History of the Conquest of New Spain). She received a doctorate in literary theory from the Unidad Iztapalapa of the Universidad Autónoma Metropolitana.

== Career ==
After graduation, she worked as a correspondent from Puebla for El Universal.

She eventually joined the Mexico City government during Andrés Manuel López Obrador's period as Head of Government of Mexico City. It is during this time that they met.

Gutiérrez Müller is a professor and researcher at the Instituto de Ciencias Sociales y Humanidades "Alfonso Vélez Pliego" of the Meritorious Autonomous University of Puebla. She has published several scholarly books on literary topics. She is also a singer.

== Personal life ==
On 16 October 2006, she married López Obrador and in April 2007, Jesús Ernesto López Gutiérrez was born (her firstborn, López Obrador's fourth). In spite of her being the wife of the incumbent President of Mexico, Gutiérrez Müller rejected the title of First Lady of Mexico for being a "role with no concrete functions or responsibilities".

Honorary titles
Preceded by Angélica Rivera	First Lady of Mexico; 2018–2024	Succeeded by Jesús María Tarriba as First Gentleman
