= Clara Oriol de la Huerta =

Mexican First Lady and concert pianist

- Born: January 11, 1884; Guaymas, Mexico
- Died: December 12, 1967 (aged 83)
- Occupation: Concert pianist
- Spouse: Adolfo de la Huerta
- Children: Arturo and Adolfo
- Parents: Pedro Oriol Félix (father); Mariana Ortiz de la Torre Sandoval (mother)

Clara Oriol de la Huerta (née Oriol Ortiz; January 11, 1884 – December 12, 1967) was a concert pianist and the First Lady of Mexico from June 1 to November 30, 1920. She was the wife of Mexican president Adolfo de la Huerta.

== Biography ==
Clara Oriol de la Huerta was born in Guaymas, Mexico on January 11, 1884, to Pedro Oriol Félix and Mariana Ortiz de la Torre Sandoval. Oriol de la Huerta had two sons, Arturo and Adolfo. Clara was an accomplished concert pianist and only rarely did she attend official ceremonies with her husband. When her husband was exiled to Los Angeles, Clara and their sons moved with him and did not return to Mexico until the 1940s.

Clara Oriol de la Huerta died at the age of 83 on December 12, 1967.

== See also ==
- First Lady of Mexico
