= Virginia Salinas de Carranza =

Virginia Salinas de Carranza (September 20, 1861 – November 9, 1919) was the initial First Lady of Mexico after the Mexican Revolution. She was married to Venustiano Carranza, a major leader of the revolution and first constitutional President of Mexico from around 1917–1920. Virginia also stood out as an influential woman during the revolution and is mentioned in the Dictionary of the Mexican Revolution (Diccionario de la Revolucion Mexicana). She was a highly educated woman, which was uncommon at the time, and constantly supporting her husband in any way she could in defeating Victoriano Huerta and his forces during the Mexican Revolution.

Virginia Salinas de Carranza died at the age of 58 on November 9, 1919, in Querétaro, Mexico.

== See also ==
- First Lady of Mexico
