= Carlos Armando Biebrich =

Mexican lawyer and politician (1939–2021)

Governor of Sonora
- In office 13 September 1973 – 25 October 1975
- Preceded by: Faustino Félix Serna
- Succeeded by: Alejandro Carrillo Marcor

Member of the Chamber of Deputies for Sonora's 4th district
- In office 1 September 1967 – 31 August 1970
- Preceded by: Rodolfo Velázquez Grijalva
- Succeeded by: Javier Bours Almada

Personal details
- Born: 19 November 1939 Sahuaripa, Sonora, Mexico
- Died: 14 January 2021 (aged 81) Hermosillo
- Party: PRI
- Profession: Lawyer and politician

Carlos Armando Biebrich Torres (19 November 1939 – 14 January 2021) was a Mexican lawyer and politician from the Institutional Revolutionary Party. He was Governor of Sonora from 1973 to 1975.

== Biography ==
Carlos Armando Biebrich Torres was born on 19 November 1939 in Sahuaripa, Sonora.

Before he turned 30, Biebrich Torres was subsecretary of the Secretariat of the Interior under President Luis Echeverría Álvarez.

Biebrich served as Governor of Sonora from 1973 to 1975. In October 1975 a group of Yaqui farmers took over some private property that they said had been unfairly taken from them. Governor Biebrich ordered the violent expulsion of the farmers, and several died. Biebrich was forced to resign; the incident was investigated and he was exonerated of any wrongdoing. President Echeverría expropriated the land at the end of his term and turned it over to the Yaqui farmers.

He also served as a deputy in the XLVII (1964–1967) and LX (2006–2009) Legislatures of the Mexican Congress, representing Sonora.

In 2002 he was part of the PRI Executive Committee, under the leadership of Roberto Madrazo Pintado.

Biebrich died of COVID-19 in Hermosillo on 14 January 2021, during the COVID-19 pandemic in Mexico.

Preceded by Faustino Félix Serna	Governor of Sonora; 1973 — 1975	Succeeded by Alejandro Carrillo Marcor
