= Concepción Lombardo =

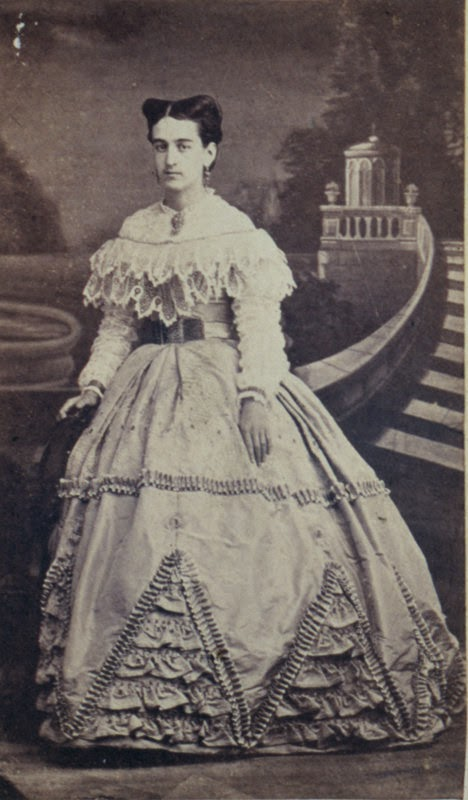

First Lady of Mexico
- In office 2 February 1859 – 13 August 1860
- Preceded by: Felipa González del Castillo
- Succeeded by: María de la Gracia Palafox

First Lady of Mexico
- In office 16 August 1860 – 24 December 1860
- Preceded by: Josefa Cárdena
- Succeeded by: Felipa González del Castillo

Personal details
- Born: 8 November 1835 Mexico City, Mexico
- Died: March 18, 1921 (aged 85) Toulouse, France
- Spouse: Miguel Miramón
- Occupation: First lady of Mexico

Concepción Lombardo Gil de Partearroyo, best known in the history of Mexico as Concepción or Concha Lombardo Miramon (November 8, 1835 – March 18, 1921), was the wife of Major General Miguel Miramón, who served twice as President of Mexico between 1859 and 1860. Born Maria de la Concepcion Josefa Ramona Ignacia Severa Lombardo, she was born in Mexico City to a wealthy family headed by her father, Francisco Maria Lombardo.

== Early years ==
Of Irish ancestry paternally, the Lombardos were a noble foreign family that settled in Spain around 1640 and moved to New Spain in the late eighteenth century, and related by matrilineal with the Spanish home of the Marquis of San Felipe; Maria de la Concepcion Josefa Ramona Ignacia Severa Lombardo Gil de Partearroyo, as was to be baptized by Mr. José Maria de Jesus Belaunzarán, Bishop of Linares.

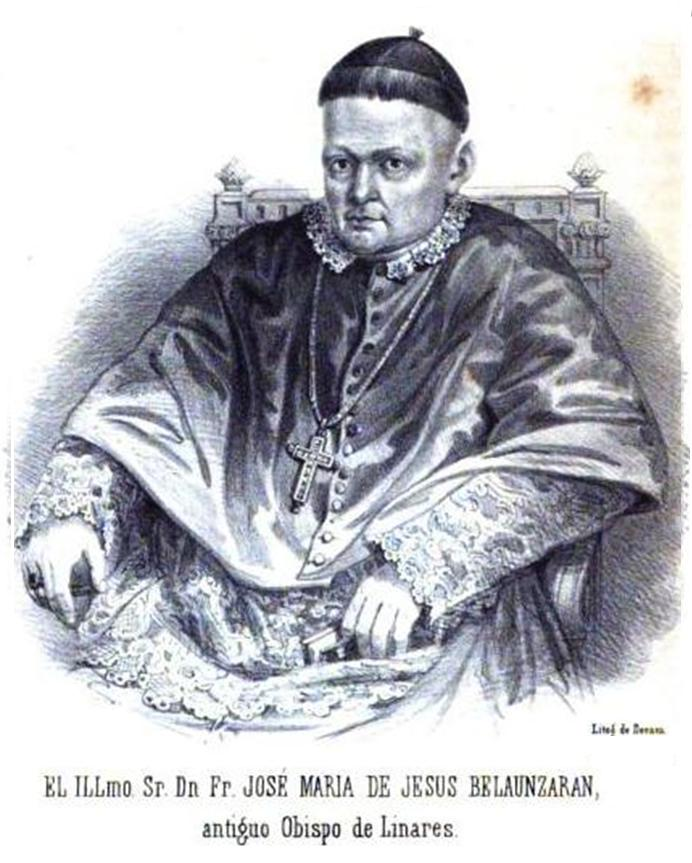
Mons Belaunzarán baptized Concepción Lombardo

She was born in Mexico City on Sunday, November 8, 1835, in a family of ancestry and wealth. She was the sixth of twelve children - six men and six women - who were born of the marriage, of lawyer Francisco Maria Lombardo de la Peña and (August 15, 1799 - April 11, 1855) and his wife, Maria Germana Gil de Partearroyo Miñón (c 1811 -. April 6, 1853). Francisco and Maria were married in Mexico city on April 17, 1824.

Lombardo de la Peña was a prominent lawyer, signer of the Declaration of Independence of the Mexican Empire, constituent, 1823, signer of the Federal Constitution of the United Mexican States 1824, who held various positions, including Secretary of the Treasury and Chancellor in the governments of Antonio López de Santa Anna, Anastasio Bustamante and Valentín Gómez Farías. His wife, Maria Germana, as befitted upper-class women of her time, only received religious education in a convent and was dedicated to housework.

== Education, marriage, and political life ==
As they were many children, the duties of society besides her mother were numerous and social doctrine of the time called for Concepcion to not have been educated at home. As a child she studied at a convent school run by the Peñarrojas ladies. There she received a strict upbringing that included flogging, donkey ears and a cat thrown at her by her one of the schools teachers, who in Concepcions own words "was a devil incarnate." The instruction was reduced to reading and catechism that forced her to learn by heart; until the lesson was known word for word. Some of Concepcions own teachers were barely literate, with their emphasis being on sewing and embroidery, with Concepcion having to perfect the craft through tears and punishments. One of her instructors at the school included the First Lady of Mexico, Joaquina Bezares, wife of Mexican President, General Melchor Múzquiz. Annually, during school breaks, Concepcions mother sent her to spend a month outside the capital at the family owned farm in a village called Tizapán.

Despite the unruly era in which she lived, she was strictly educated in a convent school, where she was taught catechism, needlework and embroidery. She led a normal life, attending the theater, dances, parties, and taking lessons in singing and horse riding. She was orphaned in her early youth and left with few resources. She was linked romantically to an Englishman (and had to hide in a convent as a result) and then with Miguel Miramón, whom she met on a visit to the Military College when he was a lieutenant.

As soon as Miramón reached the rank of major general he proposed marriage. Concepcion Lombardo and Miramón were married in 1858. They ultimately had six children. A year into the marriage, Miramón was elected president and Concepcion Lombardo became First Lady, which caused her much concern since she knew the fractured political and military situation facing Mexico. Nevertheless, she encouraged her husband to fight for their conservative ideals.

From this date, she saw little of Miramón, as he had to continue his military campaign, and protocol prevented her from accompanying him to either official ceremonies or social events. Mrs. Miramon was not allowed to sit next to him in the official box and had to dance with him at parties, because they were considered protagónicas, attitudes of a woman who wanted to feel the same relevance and authority as that of the president of Mexico. Additionally, Mrs. Miramon could not attend public places and events alone as it was not socially acceptable.

With the arrival of Maximilian of Habsburg in Mexico, the Miramon Lombardo family went to Berlin. In 1866, when Emperor Napoleon III supported the Mexican emperor, Miramón returned to the country to fight for the Second Mexican Empire, which ended up being a lost cause and would end with the imprisonment and execution of Maximilian, Miguel Miramón and Tomás Mejía.

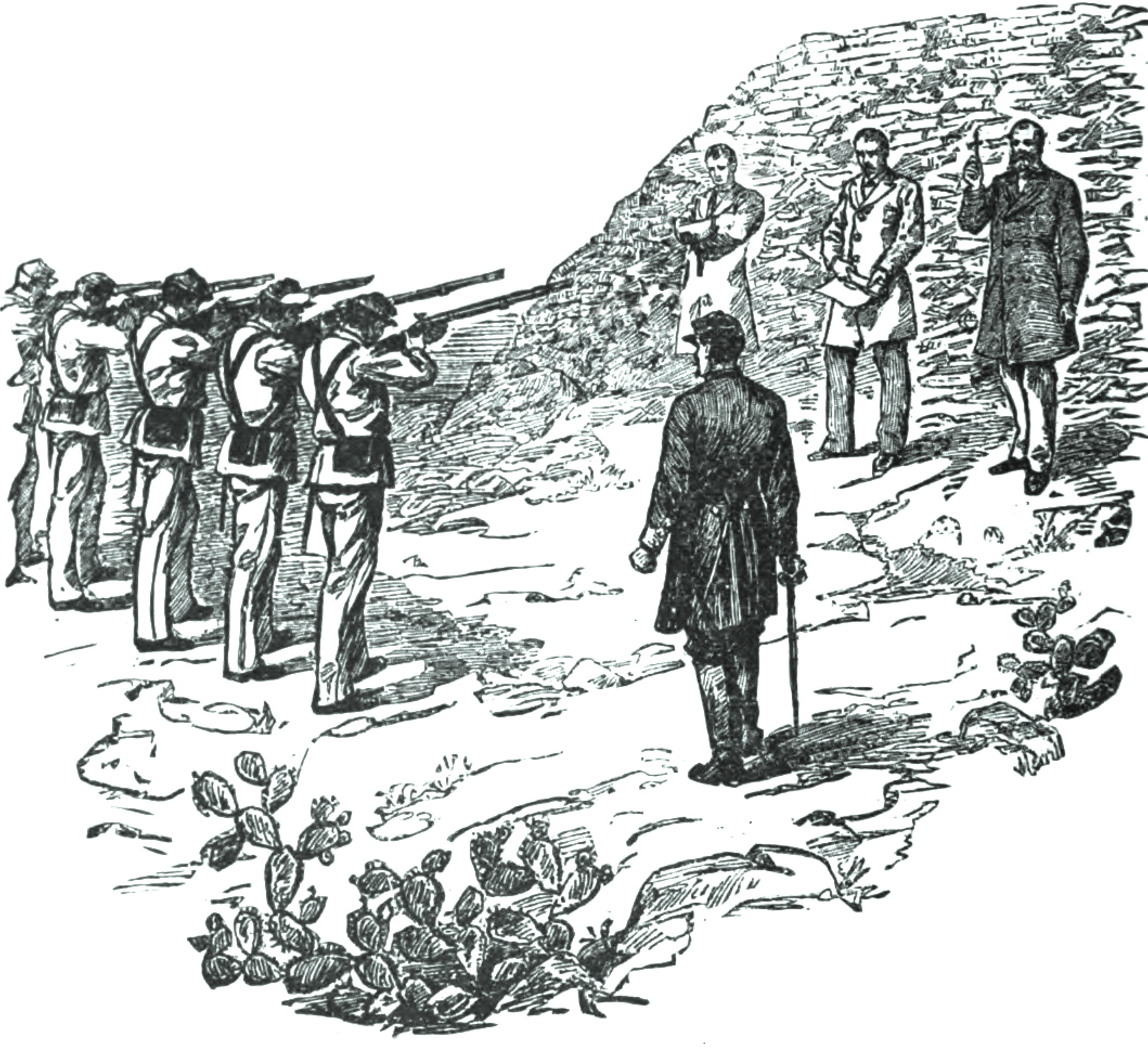
From left to right, execution of the generals Miguel Miramón and Tomás Mejía. On the far right is the Emperor Maximilian, who gave the center, place of honor at Miramón.

She was faithful to the memory of her husband for the rest of her days. Even traveling to Europe, to request the support of the courts of Austria and Belgium on behalf of her husband, with only Belgian pledging aid. She lived in Rome after the fall of the Second Mexican Empire and died on March 18, 1921, in Toulouse, France, at 85 years old.

== Memories ==
With simple style, this intelligent woman gave to the history of Mexico a gem; entitled Memoirs, she began writing at age 80. Along with the set of memories and experiences of his life, laden with a deep knowledge of the circumstances of his time, exposed under the conservative perspective that left her father and her husband, the volume of its publication has a little over a thousand pages.

The Memoirs of Concepción Lombardo Miramon were published 60 years after her death, thanks to the generosity of Francisco Cortina Portilla who, as explained in its preliminary Felipe Teixidor acquired them from Miramon granddaughter in the city of Palermo, where, elderly and sick, she continued giving Spanish classes. Her testimony is one of the best first hand accounts of one of the most tragic episodes in the history of Mexico.

== Bibliography ==
- Lombardo de Miramón, Concepción. (1980). Preliminary reports and notes of Felipe Teixidor. Mexico, Porrua. XV and 1008 p.
- Serchovich, Sara. (2010). The fate of the consort. The wives of the rulers of Mexico: a forgotten history and story of a failure. Mexico, Ocean. p. 107-116.
- Tovar Ramírez, Aurora. (1996). "Lombardo de Miramón, Concepción" Fifteen hundred women in our collective consciousness. Women biographical catalog of Mexico. Mexico, DEMAC. p. 361-362.
