= Jesús María Tarriba =

First Gentleman of Mexico since 2024

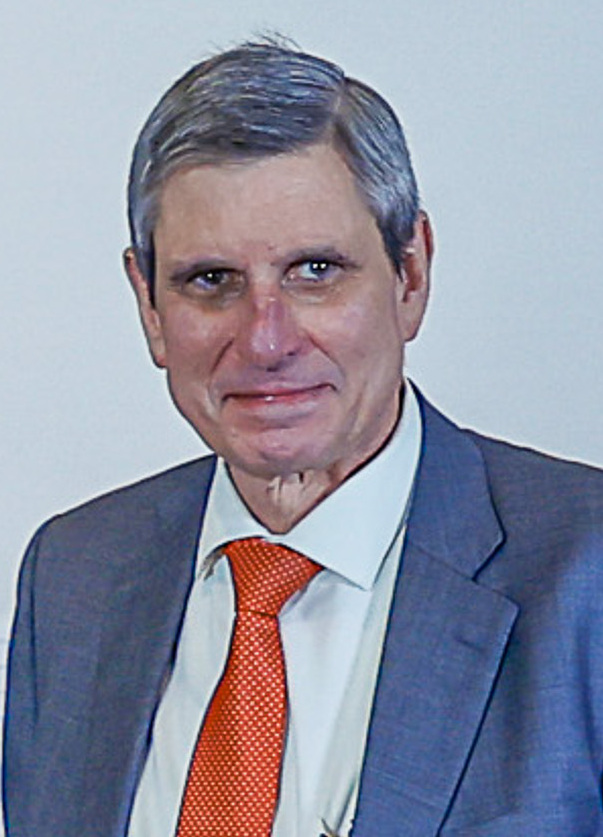
- Tarriba in 2024

First Gentleman of Mexico
- Assumed role 1 October 2024
- President: Claudia Sheinbaum
- Preceded by: Beatriz Gutiérrez Müller (as First Lady)

Personal details
- Born: Jesús María Tarriba Unger; 1 September 1962 (age 64) Mazatlán, Sinaloa, Mexico
- Spouses: Martha Tello Díaz (divorced); Claudia Sheinbaum (m. 2023)
- Children: 1
- Education: National Autonomous University of Mexico (PhD)

Jesús María Tarriba Unger (born 1 September 1962) is a Mexican physicist and financial risk management expert who is the First Gentleman of Mexico. He is married to the President of Mexico, Claudia Sheinbaum. As the first husband of a president, Tarriba is the first First Gentleman in Mexican federal history.

Tarriba worked as a quantitative analyst for Banamex from 1994 to 1997. He later moved to Spain to work with Banco Santander where he took up different positions, the most relevant being Director of Risk Management, a position he held from 2008 to 2016.

== Biography ==
Born on September 1, 1962, in the Mexican city of Mazatlán, Sinaloa. Born to Jaime Tarriba Rodil, and Beatriz Unger Ferreia, his father was originally from Culiacán and his mother from Mazatlán.

He studied at the Instituto Cultural de Occidente in his hometown. In 1977, at the age of 15, he moved to Mexico City to study at a private high school.

He completed his studies at the Faculty of Sciences of the National Autonomous University of Mexico (UNAM), where he obtained a bachelor's degree in physics in 1988, a master's degree in 1989 and a doctorate in Physical Sciences in 1994, with the thesis: " Optical and magnetic response of systems with interfaces ". During his training, he also completed a doctoral stay at the University of California at Irvine, which earned him the Weizmann Prize for Exact Sciences, awarded by the Mexican Academy of Sciences, for the best doctoral thesis.

=== Career ===
In 1993 he was technical director at the United Advisors Group (GAUSSC).

Since 2017, he has been a financial risk specialist at the Bank of Mexico.

== Personal life ==
He married anthropologist Martha Tello Díaz, with whom he had a daughter. The couple later separated.

During his college years, he met Claudia Sheinbaum, whom he dated for a year. In December 2016, after returning from Spain, he met Sheinbaum again, and they began a relationship. On November 17, 2023, after a seven-year relationship, they married in a private ceremony.

Honorary titles
Preceded by Beatriz Gutiérrez Müller as First Lady	First Gentleman of Mexico; 2024–present	Current holder
