= Antigua Escuela de Jurisprudencia, Mexico City =

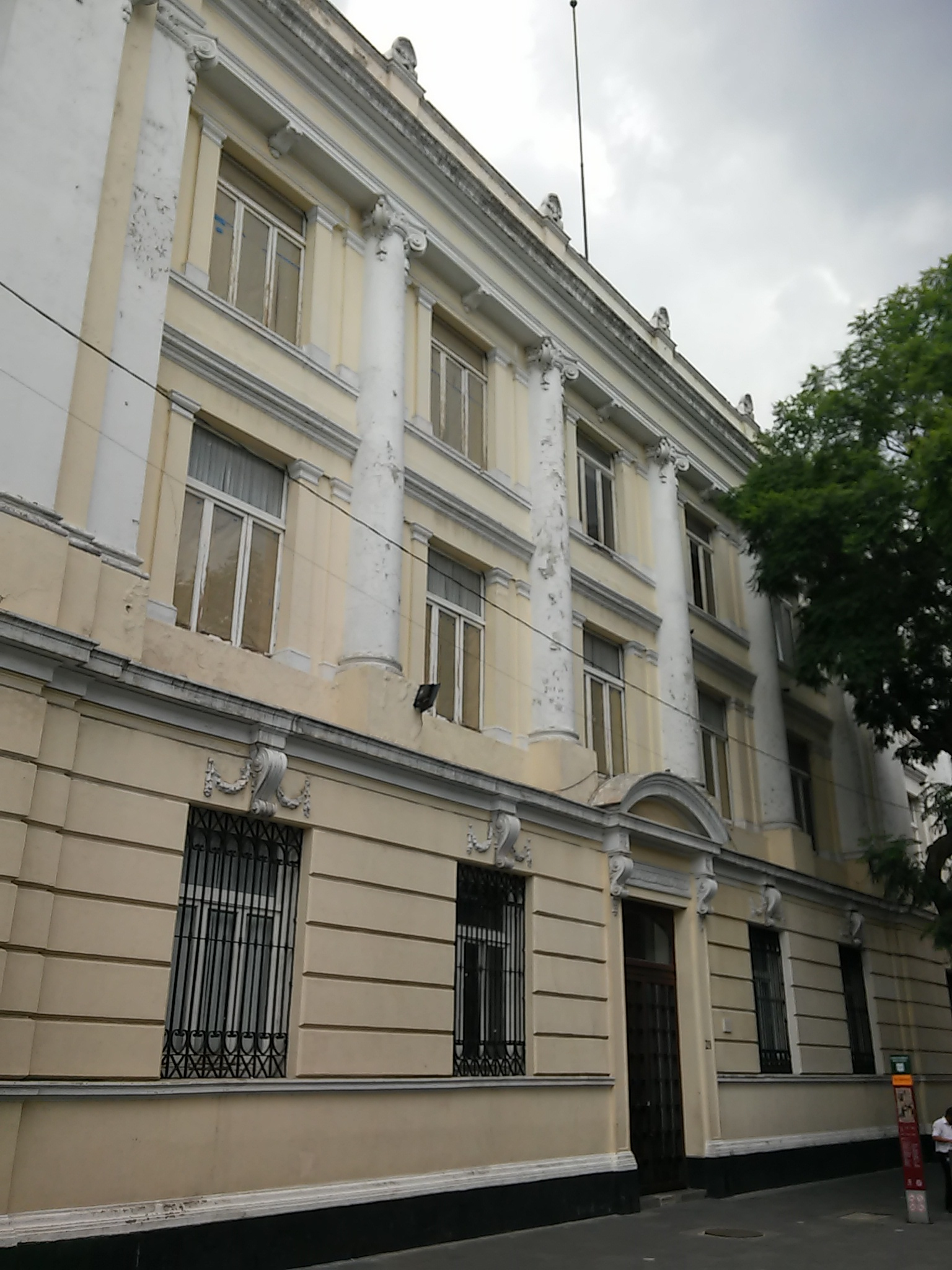

The Antigua Escuela de Jurisprudencia (Old School of Jurisprudence) building is located on the corner of Republica de Argentina and San Ildefonso Streets in the historic center of Mexico City. The building originally was convent for Dominican nuns called Santa Catalina de Siena.After the Reform Laws the government took possession of the building and worked to turn it into a military barracks, transforming and partially demolishing it. In the meantime, the National University of Mexico, the forerunner of UNAM, had been closed in 1833, and the Jurisprudence School was recreated at the College of San Ildefonso. In 1868, the National Preparatory High School was founded in the same building so the Jurisprudence School moved to the ex Convent of La Encarnación,(now SEP) and finally to the ex Convent of Santa Catalina de Siena. In 1908, Diaz inaugurated this building as the Escuela Nacional de Jurispudencia (National School of Jurisprudence) .

Two years later, Justo Sierra founded the Universidad Nacional de Mexico, who was a graduate of the Jurisprudence School. This school was integrated into the new university along with a number of other professional schools. In 1929, a student movement, of which the Jurisprudence School played a decisive role, succeeded in making the University autonomous, meaning the government would not directly dictate the school’s curriculum.

In 1948, the Jurisprudence building became sole property of the university. In 1954, with the building of new facilities at the Ciudad Universitaria, the School moved south. The building now houses the continuing education and alumni services of the School of Law.

The facade of the building is of two levels. The lower level is mostly devoid of any ornamentation but the upper level is based on Palladian architecture, especially in its use of columns with pediments. However, most of the building, inside and out shows an eclectic mixture of architectural styles, because it had been remodeled a number of times during different architectural periods. The interior contains what remains of the old convent’s patios although they have been greatly altered. The third floor was added at the beginning of the 20th century.
