= Eva Sámano =

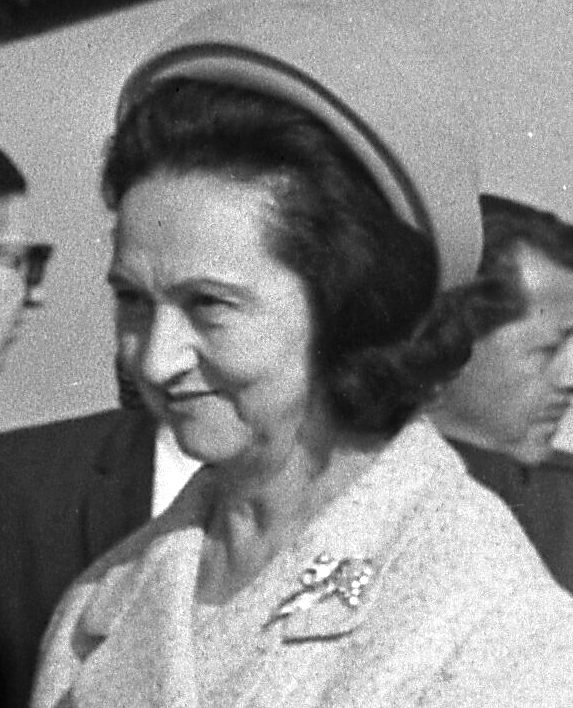

First Lady of Mexico
- In role December 1, 1958 – November 30, 1964
- President: Adolfo López Mateos
- Preceded by: María Izaguirre
- Succeeded by: Guadalupe Borja

Personal details
- Born: Eva Sámano Bishop; May 5, 1910 San Nicolás del Oro, Guerrero
- Died: January 7, 1984 (aged 73) Mexico City, Mexico
- Party: Institutional Revolutionary Party
- Spouse: Adolfo López Mateos (m. 1937; died 1969)
- Profession: Educator

Eva Sámano Bishop (May 5, 1910 – January 7, 1984) was a Mexican educator. She was the second wife of President Adolfo López Mateos and First Lady of Mexico from 1958 to 1964.

== Biography ==
Eva Samano de López Mateos was born in Mexico in San Nicolás del Oro, Guerrero on May 5, 1910. Early in her career, she taught at the Scientific and Literary Institute in Toluca. In 1937, she married future president Lopez Mateos. She served as First Lady of Mexico from 1958 until 1964. In 1961, she founded the National Institute for Infants, which The New York Times describes as "Mexico's first social assistance organization dedicated solely to children." The article also stated she "initiated the national movement to organize and improve medical and educational services for Mexican children." After her husband died in 1973, she returned to teaching.

== Personal life and death ==
Upon her death in 1984, she was survived by a daughter.

== See also ==
- List of first ladies of Mexico
- Politics of Mexico

Honorary titles
Preceded by María Izaguirre	First Lady of Mexico; 1958–1964	Succeeded by Guadalupe Borja de Díaz Ordaz
