= Inés García de López de Santa Anna =

First Lady of Mexico (1811–1844)

Inés García de López de Santa Anna, also María Inés de la Paz García y Martínez de Uzcanga (Jan. 21, 1811 in Alvarado, Viceroyalty of New Spain – Aug. 23, 1844) was the First Lady of Mexico as the first wife of Mexican President Antonio López de Santa Anna.

== Biography ==
She married Santa Anna in a ceremony on September 25, 1825, in Alvarado, in which her husband was not present. Her parents were wealthy Spaniards. Santa Anna received more than six million pesos as a dowry, as well as receiving a hacienda between Veracruz and Jalapa (today, Xalapa). The couple would go on to have four children together: Guadalupe, María del Carmen, Manuel and Antonio.

She served as the First Lady of Mexico in three separate periods: from March 1839 to July 1839 (Santa Anna's third term as president); October 1841 to October 1842 (Santa Anna's fourth term as president); and March 1843 to October 1843 (when Santa Anna served as dictator). According to several sources, she was popular as First Lady.

Santa Anna and his wife adopted a Texan boy, John Christopher Columbus Hill, as their son. Hill had been captured during the siege of San Antonio, and was then sent to Mexico City, where he asked Santa Anna to free his imprisoned brother and father. Santa Anna agreed, on the condition that he and his wife could adopt Hill. Hill agreed and remained in Mexico, where he earned a doctorate from the Colegio de Minería (College of Mining).

Frances Erskine Inglis, also known as Fanny Calderón, related in her 1843 book Life in Mexico after a stay at the hacienda that it was beautiful, and that her hostess offered her a cigarette from her gold and diamond cigarette case, which Fanny declined, and then her hostess lit a small paper cigarette, quite a contrast to the opulence of the case. This was seen as scandalously modern.

She died in August 1844 and was buried in the Mexico City Metropolitan Cathedral in the chapel of Our Lady of Guadalupe.
