= National System for Integral Family Development =

Mexican Public Institution of Health

- Abbreviation: SNDIF
- Formation: January 10, 1977; 48 years ago
- Founder: Secretariat of Health
- Headquarters: Mexico

The National System for Integral Family Development (Spanish: Sistema Nacional para el Desarrollo Integral de la Familia; SNDIF or just DIF) is a Mexican public institution of social assistance that focuses on strengthening and developing the welfare of the Mexican families. The institution was founded in 1977 by Carmen Romano, the wife of Mexican President José López Portillo and First Lady of Mexico.

Its national director reports directly to the President of Mexico, and the role was traditionally held by the First Lady until 2000, when President Vicente Fox, who was unmarried, appointed Ana Teresa Aranda to the post. Its local chapters report to municipal presidents and governors.

Mexico received praise from international human rights advocates in November 2020 for changing responsibility for the care of migrant children from the National Migration Institution (NIM) to the DIF.
