= 2017 in Mexico =

- Decades: 1990s; 2000s; 2010s; 2020s
- See also: History of Mexico; List of years in Mexico; Timeline of Mexican history

This is a list of events that happened in 2017 in Mexico. The article also lists the most important political leaders during the year at both federal and state levels.

== Incumbents ==
=== Federal government ===
- President: Enrique Peña Nieto, Institutional Revolutionary Party, PRI
- Interior Secretary (SEGOB): Miguel Ángel Osorio Chong
- Secretary of Foreign Affairs (SRE):
  - Claudia Ruiz Massieu, until January 4
  - Luis Videgaray Caso, starting January 4
- Communications Secretary (SCT): Gerardo Ruiz Esparza
- Education Secretary (SEP): Aurelio Nuño Mayer
- Secretary of Defense (SEDENA): Salvador Cienfuegos Zepeda
- Secretary of Navy (SEMAR): Vidal Francisco Soberón Sanz
- Secretary of Labor and Social Welfare (STPS): Alfonso Navarrete Prida
- Secretary of Welfare (BIENESTAR): Luis Enrique Miranda Nava
- Tourism Secretary (SECTUR): Enrique de la Madrid Cordero
- Secretary of the Environment (SEMARNAT): Rafael Pacchiano Alamán
- Secretary of Health (SALUD): José Narro Robles
- Secretary of Finance and Public Credit, (SHCP)
  - Luis Videgaray Caso, until November 27
  - José Antonio González Anaya, starting November 27

=== Governors ===
- Aguascalientes: Martín Orozco Sandoval PAN
- Baja California: Francisco Vega de Lamadrid PAN
- Baja California Sur: Carlos Mendoza Davis PAN
- Campeche: Alejandro Moreno Cárdenas PRI
- Chiapas: Manuel Velasco Coello PVEM
- Chihuahua: Javier Corral Jurado PAN.
- Coahuila
  - Rubén Moreira Valdez PRI, until November 30
  - Miguel Ángel Riquelme Solís PRI, starting December 1
- Colima: José Ignacio Peralta PRI
- Durango: José Rosas Aispuro PAN
- Guanajuato: Miguel Márquez Márquez PAN
- Guerrero: Héctor Astudillo Flores PRI
- Hidalgo: Omar Fayad PRI.
- Jalisco: Aristóteles Sandoval PRI
- State of Mexico
  - Eruviel Ávila Villegas PRI, until September 15
  - Alfredo del Mazo Maza PRI, starting September 16
- Michoacán: Silvano Aureoles Conejo PRD
- Morelos: Graco Ramírez PRD.
- Nayarit
  - Roberto Sandoval Castañeda PRI, until September 18
  - Antonio Echevarría García PAN, starting September 19
- Nuevo León: Jaime Rodríguez Calderón ("El Bronco") Independent, until December 31. (Note: "El Bronco" took a leave of absence in 2018 to run for President.)
- Oaxaca: Alejandro Murat Hinojosa PRI.
- Puebla
  - Rafael Moreno Valle Rosas PAN, until January 31.
  - José Antonio Gali Fayad PAN, starting February 1.
- Querétaro: Francisco Domínguez Servién PAN
- Quintana Roo: Carlos Joaquín González PRI.
- San Luis Potosí: Juan Manuel Carreras PRI
- Sinaloa: Quirino Ordaz Coppel PRI
- Sonora: Claudia Pavlovich Arellano PRI
- Tabasco: Arturo Núñez Jiménez PRD
- Tamaulipas: Francisco Javier García Cabeza de Vaca PAN
- Tlaxcala: Marco Antonio Mena Rodríguez PRI
- Veracruz: Miguel Ángel Yunes Linares PAN
- Yucatán: Rolando Zapata Bello PRI
- Zacatecas: Miguel Alonso Reyes PRI
- Head of Government of the Federal District/Mexico City: (Note: The DF ceased to exist on February 5, at which time Mexico City became autonomous (equal to a state) with its own constitution.) Miguel Ángel Mancera, Independent

== Events ==
=== January to March ===
- 1 January – Consumers are concerned about abrupt increases in gasoline prices, known as el gasolinazo.
- 18 January – Colegio Americano del Noreste shooting; a 15-year-old student shoots a teacher and three classmates in Monterrey.
- 12 March – Former Interim governor Flavino Ríos Alvarado of Veracruz is arrested for covering up his predecessor's, Javier Duarte de Ochoa, crimes and helping him escape.
- 13 March – SEP announces educational reform measures.
- 14 March – A mass grave site of more than 250 people is discovered in Palmas de Abajo, Veracruz.
- 16 March – Prison escape in Culiacán.
- 31 March – A driver crashes after driving his car 200 kilometres (120 mi) per hour on Paseo de la Reforma, Mexico City.

=== April to June ===
- 10 April – Former Tamaulipas governor Tomás Yarrington, (PRI), is arrested in Italy, charged with plotting the murder of gubnatorial candidate Rodolfo Torre Cantú in 2010.
- 15 April – Former Veracruz governor Javier Duarte, (PRI, 2010–2016) is arrested in Panajachel, Sololá Department, Guatemala.
- 21 May – 42-year-old Russian Alextime kills a 19-year-old man in Cancun after a mob tries to lynch the Russian. He had earlier posted anti-Mexican racist comments on YouTube, but authorities refused to deport him.
- 4 June – Elections
  - Gubnatorial election in the State of Mexico, won by Alfredo del Mazo Maza (PRI).
  - General elections in CoahuilaNayarit; Miguel Ángel Riquelme Solís (PRI), elected governor.
  - General elections in Nayarit; Antonio Echevarría García (PAN), elected governor.
  - Municipal elections in Tlaxcala and Veracruz.

=== July to September ===
- August – Hurricanes Franklin and Katia; the latter kills two in Veracruz.
- 21 August – A partial solar eclipse is visible.
- 7 September
  - A magnitude 8.1 earthquake hit off southern Mexico coast, 300 injuries, 98 people killed, and tsunami have surrounding warning issue.
  - The Chamber of Deputies ends a logjam.
- 19 September – A magnitude 7.1 earthquake strikes central Mexico, killing more than 200 people.

=== October to December ===
- 10 November — At 7:25 local time, eruption of Popocateptl continues.
- 18 to 20 November – Sales for El Buen Fin are less than anticipated.
- 25 December – An earthquake in Acapulco of 5.0 magnitude triggers the alarm in Mexico City, but no injuries or damages are reported.

== Holidays, and observances ==
- January 1 – New Year's Day, statutory holiday
- January 6 – Feast of the Epiphany
- February 2 – Feast of Candlemas
- February 6 – Constitution Day, statutory holiday
- February 14 – Day of Love and Friendship
- February 20 – Mexican Army Day, civic holiday
- February 23 to 28 – Carnival in Mexico
- February 24 – Flag Day, civic holiday
- March 8 – International Women's Day
- March 18 – Anniversary of the Mexican oil expropriation, civic holiday
- March 20 – March equinox
- March 21 – Benito Juárez's Birthday, statutory holiday
- April 9 to 15 – Holy Week
- March 13 – Holy Thursday
- March 14 – Good Friday
- April 21 – Heroic Defense of Veracruz, civic holiday
- April 30 – Children's Day
- May 1 – Labour Day, statutory holiday
- May 5 – Cinco de Mayo, civic holiday
- May 8 – Miguel Hidalgo y Costilla's Birthday, civic holiday
- May 10 – Mother's Day
- May 15 – Teachers' Day
- June 1 – Mexican Navy Day, civic holiday
- June 18 – Father's Day
- June 20 – June solstice
- September 13 – Anniversary of the "Heroic Cadets", civic holiday
- September 15 – Cry of Dolores, civic holiday
- September 16 – Independence Day, statutory holiday
- September 30 – José María Morelos's Birthday, civic holiday
- October 12 – Day of the Race, civic holiday
- November 1 – All Saints' Day
- November 2 – Day of the Dead
- November 20 – Revolution Day, statutory holiday
- November 26 – Feast of Christ the King
- December 12 – Feast of Our Lady of Guadalupe
- December 16 to 24 – Las Posadas
- December 21 – December solstice
- December 24 – Christmas Eve
- December 25 – Christmas Day, statutory holiday

== Awards ==
- Belisario Domínguez Medal of Honor – Julia Carabias Lillo
- Order of the Aztec Eagle
  - David Drier, U.S. Congressman (R-CA).
  - Stuart Gulliver, HSBC
  - Marcelo Rebelo de Sousa, President of Portugal
- National Prize for Arts and Sciences
  - Linguistics and literature – Alberto Ruy Sánchez
  - Physics, Mathematics, and Natural Sciences – María Elena Álvarez-Buylla Roces
  - Technology and Design – Emilio Sacristan Rock
  - Popular Arts and Traditions – Francisco Barnett Astorga
  - Fine arts – Nicolás Echevarría
  - History, Social Sciences, and Philosophy – Mercedes de la Garza
- National Public Administration Prize
- Ohtli Award
  - Sarahi Espinoza Salamanca
  - Joseph I. Castro

== Deaths ==
=== January ===
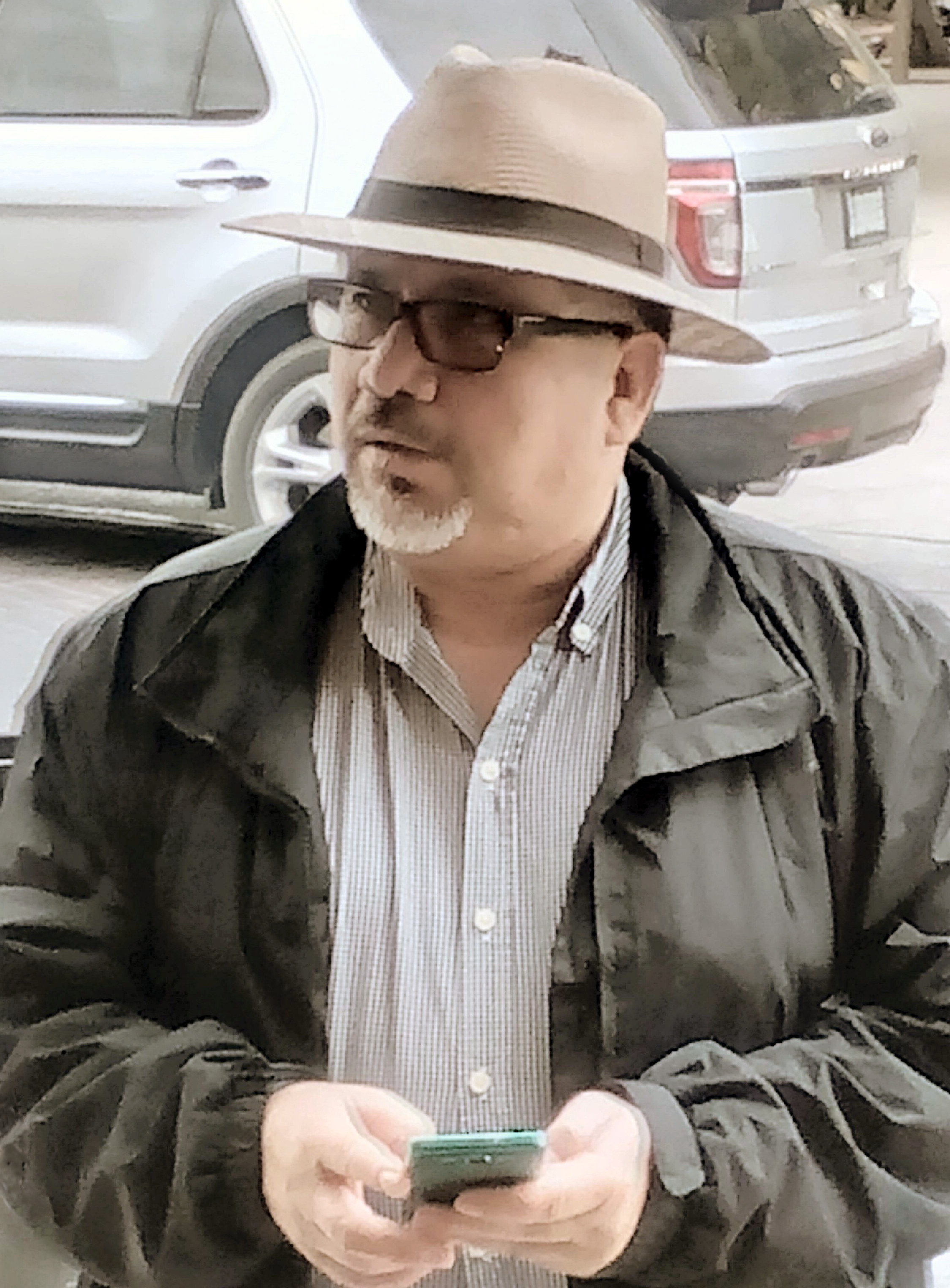
Javier Valdez Cárdenas

- January 1
  - Edson Tadeo Cárdenas Huerta (17), soccer player (Tigres UANL) (b. 1999).
  - Martha Patricia Figueroa Juárez (53), social activist, businesswoman, politician in Cordoba, Veracruz; cáncer.
  - Serafín Espinal (65), músician.
- January 2
  - Ernesto Franco Cobos, cultural promoter and writer in Tuxpan.
  - Olegario Contreras Rubio, radio announcer in Sinaloa; heart problems.
  - Analy Loera, businesswoman and cultural promoter; brain and lung cancer.
- January 3
  - Cecilia González Gómez, 55, politician, Deputy (2012-2915); heart attack (b. 1961).
  - Lucía Eugenia Torres Pereda, journalist.
- January 5
  - Marco Francisco González Meza, public servant, accidente de tráfico.
  - Alfonso Humberto Robles Cota, Roman Catholic bishop of Tepic (b. 1931).
  - Cesáreo Víctor Santiago López, polítician from Oaxaca; murdered.
  - Carmen Sánchez Galán (45), public servant; complicaciones post-operative complications.
- January 15
  - Isidro Baldenegro López, environmental activist, murdered.
  - Gorky González Quiñones, ceramist (b. 1939).
- January 16 – Romeo Gómez Aguilar (97), músician and academic (b. 1919).
- January 17 – Martín Barrón Félix (52), physicist and meteorologist; liver failure and anemia (b. 1964).
- January 18 – Raúl Muñoz Popoca (77), businessman in tourist industry.
- January 19
  - David Contreras, polítician (PRI) and public servant; diabetes.
  - Fernando Soto (17), músician from Jalisco; drowning.
- January 20 – Abraham Ibarra Robles, public servant from Santa María Colotepec, Oaxaca; murdered.
- January 21 – Fernando Maiz Garza (57), businessman, builder, and philanthropist; airplane crash (b. 1959).
- January 22
  - Jesus Garcia, 72, boxer.
  - Juan Huerta Ortega (67), businessman and rancher from Puebla; heart attack (b. 1949).
  - Isidro Patrón Lara, musician.
- January 23 – Giovanni Arturo Amparan Zaragoza (30), businessman; shot.
- January 24
  - Ismael Gutiérrez (79), boxer (b. 1937).
  - Antolín Vital Martínez, polítician, mayor of Tepexco, Puebla; murdered.
- January 25
  - Adalberto Rosas López, polítician from (Ciudad Obregón), Sonora; thrombosis.
  - Agustín Sauret (85), voice actor ("Ned Flanders" in The Simpsons).
  - Raúl Valerio, 90, actor (Por tu amor (telenovela), Clase 406, La Verdad Oculta, Imperio de Cristal).
- January 26 – Javier García Narro, businessperson and leader of Coparmex (a business association) in Saltillo, Coahuila.
- January 27
  - Fredman Cruz Maldonado, singer; lung problems.
  - Mario Palestina Moreno (45), baseball player; heart attack (b. 1971).
- January 28
  - Benjamín Cabral, filmmaker.
  - Víctor Hugo Saldaña Gutiérrez (22), soccer player; murdered (b. November 8, 1994).
- January 29
  - Omar Jair Canepa Polanco, public servant; murdered.
  - Ángel García Cook (79), anthropologist and researcher (INAH) (b. 1937).
  - Jorge Robles, músician and singer; cáncer.
- January 30 – Fidel Briano (72), lawyer and journalist.
- January 31
  - Pedro Koh Cimé, Yucatan polítician; murdered.
  - José Luis Lagunes López, public servant; cáncer.

=== February ===
- February 3 – Lorenzo Servitje, 98, businessman and philanthropist, co-founder of Grupo Bimbo (b. November 20, 1918.
- February 7 – Eusebio Ruvalcaba (65), writer (Un hilito de sange), journalist, essayist, playwright (b. 1951).
- February 9 – Josefina Leiner, actress (b. 1929).
- February 15 – José Solé, 87, stage actor and director (Premio Nacional de Ciencias y Artes) (b. July 28, 1929).
- February 16 – Teresa del Conde, art historian and critic (b. 1935).
- February 21 – Neus Espresate Xirau (83), Spanish-born Mexican editor (founder of Ediciones Era); complicaciones respiratorias (n. 1934).
- February 22
  - David Bárcena Ríos, equestrian and modern pentathlete (b. 1941).
  - Ricardo Domínguez, 31, welterweight wrestler; colon cancer (b. 1985).
- February 27 – Eva Maria Zuk, 71, Polish-born Mexican pianist; lung problems.

=== March ===
- March 3
  - Rolando Arellano Sánchez (22), músician and singer ("Grupo Contacto"), murdered.
  - Miguel Guzmán Rosales (66), painter.
- March 5
  - Abril Campillo (58), actress; breast cancer (b. 1958).
  - Tony Flores (67), comedian; Amyotrophic Lateral Sclerosis.
  - Alejandro Rosales (49), television star (El Sibidibidi); heart attack.
  - José Ignacio Rosillo Rodríguez (85), journalist.
- March 6 – Jesús Silva Herzog Flores, 81, economist and politician (PRI) (b. 1935)
- March 9
  - Enrique Ortiz Rivas, mathematician, politician, and labor leader; surgical complications.
  - Raquel Parot (92), actress
  - Juan Gabriel Sánchez Gómez (43), leader of taxi drivers in Tizayuca, Hidalgo; murdered.
  - Zorro (62), singer and politician, stroke.
- March 12
  - Mario Agredano Brambila (88), radio and television announcer, reporter, and commentator in Nuevo Leon.
  - Joaquín Arizpe de la Maza, businessman and philanthropist.
  - Refugio Arturo García Moreno (63), education leader ("Conalep"); heart attack.
  - Raúl Maldonado Mendoza, poet and orator from Oaxaca; heart attack.
- March 13 – Sarah Jiménez, engraving artist, member of the Salón de la Plástica Mexicana; respiratory problems (b. 1927).
- March 14 – José Iván Ponce, labor leader in Tizayuca, Hidalgo; murdered.
- March 15 – Armando Garza Sada (84), engineer, businessman (Cuauhtémoc Moctezuma Brewery), and banker (Banco de Londres y México and Banpais).
- March 18
  - Juan Miguel de Mora Vaquerizo (96), member of the International Brigade during the Spanish Civil War, university professor, and writer (b. October 18, 1921).
  - Santiago Vela, reporter for "Radio Formula" in Fortín de las Flores, Veracruuz; murdered.
- March 19 – José Reza Fernández (61), polítician in Cuatro Ciénegas, Coahuila; suicide.
- March 20
  - Arturo Cruz Bárcenas (58), journalist (La Jornada); renal disease.
  - Carlos Hermosillo Arteaga, 39, politician (PRI), Deputy (2015-2018) and public servant in Chihuahua; auto accident (b. 1977).
  - Antonio Riviello Bazán (90), former Secretary of National Defense (1988) (b. Nov 21, 1926).
  - Humberto Romo Medina, radio and television announcer in Nuevo Leon.
- March 21
  - Víctor Bartoli (65), writer (Mujer Alabastrina) from Ciudad Juárez, Chihuahua.
  - Marco Villafán (64), translator and adaptor of theatrical productions.
- March 23 – Miroslava Breach, 54, journalist (La Jornada and El Norte de Chihuahua); murdered (b. August 7, 1962).
- March 29
  - Felipe Altamirano Carrillo, Indigenous priest from Nayarit; murdered.
  - Dennis Palomo (21), comedian; suicide.
  - Aurelio Prado Flores (68), Roman Catholic social activist and columnist (La Voz) (B. 1949).
  - Leodegario Varela González, polítician from Zacatecas; cáncer.
- March 30 – Six murders in Oaxaca:
  - Juan José Hernández Alchino, 38, teacher from Pinotepa Nacional.
  - Rutilio Quirino Barragán Andrade, 75, former mayor of Santiago Tamazola (PRD).
  - Amada Berenice H. V., a high school student from Santiago Jocotepec.
  - Abel Rivera Roque, 31, called El Tortilla, from Tuxtepec.
- March 31 – Rubén Amaro Sr., 81, baseball player (Philadelphia Phillies, New York Yankees) and coach, World Series champion (1980); natural causes (b. 1936).

=== April ===
- April 2 – Alma Delia Fuentes, actress (Los Olvidados (1950) A toda máquina (1951), and Historia de un corazón (1951)) (b. 1937).
- April 7 – Arturo García Bustos, 90, painter (b. 1926).
- April 8 – José Ángel Nájera Sánchez Fisherman, professional wrestler (b. 1951)
- April 9
  - Roger Arellano Sotelo, polítician, former mayor of Acapetlahuaya, Guerrero; murdered.
  - Fidencio Escamilla Cervantes (65), poet and playwright from Tonala, Jalisco; heart attack (n. 1951).
  - Margarita Isabel, 75, Mexican actress (Cronos), emphysema.
  - Alicia Rivas Lombera, high school theater teacher; cáncer.
  - José Alberto Toledo Villalobos, anti-mining activist in San Pedro Tapanatepec, Oaxaca; murdered.
- April 11 – Teresa Moran, 78, painter from Puebla (b. September 15, 1939).
- April 12
  - Rafael Junquera Maldonado, writer and activist (Student movement of 1968) from Xalapa, Veracruz (b. 1941 or 1942).
  - Rubén Morales Rodríguez, 79, public accountant from Veracruz (city).
- April 13 – Antonio Xiu Cachón (76), Maya Indigenous leader.
- April 14 – Max Rodríguez Palacio, journalist and reporter ("Colectivo Pericú"); murdered.
- April 19 – Demetrio Saldivar Gómez, politician (founder of Party of the Democratic Revolution in Guerrero); murdered.
- April 21 – Rogerio César Armenta Ramírez, journalist (El 10 de Guerrero).
- April 22 – Leobardo Flores Ávila, 102, co-founder of the Confederation of Mexican Workers in Torreón, Coahuila.
- April 24
  - Evangelina Villegas, 92, biochemist.
  - Juan José Flores Lira, polítician, mayor of Ignacio de la Llave, Veracruz; heart attack.
- April 28
  - Brazo de Oro, wrestler; heart attack (b. 1959).
  - Alejandro Hernández Santos, polítician, mayor of San Bartolomé Loxicha, Oaxaca; murdered.
- April 29 – Filiberto Álvarez Landeros, journalist and radio announcer in Jojutla, Morelos (Poemas y cantares and La Señal); murdered.

=== May ===
- May 1 – Santos Vega Camargo (73), actor and theater director ("El Confesionario") from Torreón (b. November 1, 1943.
- May 3 – José Herrera Aispuro (51), director of the College of Accounting and Administration of the Autonomous University of Sinaloa; murdered.
- May 4 – Guadalupe González Saíno (30), polítician from Jopala, Puebla; murdered.
- May 7 – Gran Apache, 58, professional wrestler (AAA), intestinal cancer.
- May 11
  - José Manuel Amarillas Monjardín, polítician from Novolato, Sinaloa; murdered.
  - Andrea Romero Rojas, food propomoter (cacao) from Zacatelco, Tlaxcala (b. 1953).
- May 12
  - Miguel Ángel Sánchez Morán, public servant and criminal lawyer from Mazatlán; murdered.
- May 13
  - Hermenegildo Aké Sarabia, labor leader and politician from Playa del Carmen, Quintana Roo.
- Enrique Barrera Chávez (86), form tresurer of Coahuila.
- May 15
  - Felipe Ehrenberg, 73, artist, professor and publisher (b. June 27, 1943).
  - Javier Valdez Cárdenas, journalist (Ríodoce, La Jornada), shot and killed by unidentified gunmen (b. April 14, 1967).
  - Ángel Noé Mercado Carrillo (43), physician and public servant (director is ISSSTE in Tehuacan, Puebla); murdered (b. 1974).
  - Jonathan Rodríguez Córdova (26), journalist and reporter (El Costeño de Autlán) from Autlán, Jalisco; he and his mother were murdered.
- May 16 – Mario Moreno Ivanova (57), comedian, son of Cantinflas (b. 1960).
- May 17 – Raúl Córdoba, 93, soccer player (Club Atlas, national team) (b. March 13, 1924).
- May 18
  - Armando Arce Serrano (57), camera operator and video journalist (Televisa) (b. 1959).
  - Oscar González Guerrero (91), comic book writer and illustrator.
  - José Mercado Luna (89), soccer player (1948 Olympic Team) (b. August 6, 1928).
  - Enrique Soto Gonzáles, chronicler, historian, and public servant from Pátzcuaro, Michoacan; heart attack.
- May 19 – David Sánchez, 25, flyweight boxer, traffic collision.
- May 20 – Miguel Vázquez Torres, Indigenous Huichol leader; murdered.
- May 22 – Santiago Salas de León, académic, writer, and rector of open university.
- May 24 – Miguel Ángel Camacho Zamudio, physician and public servant (director of ISSSTE in Mazatlan); murdered.
- May 25 – Juan Carlos Zamarripa Fernández, polítician, mayor of Pánuco, Veracruz; murdered.
- May 27 – Jaasiel Hernán Contreras Vega, photographer; murdered.
- May 31 – Fernando Sarabia Beltrán (108), académic and activist.

=== June ===
- June 2 – Armando Mendoza Duarte (48), polítician; murdered (b. 1969).
- June 3
  - Juan Robinson Bours, businessman from Ciudad Obregón, Sonora; Alzheimer's disease (b. December 25, 1928)
  - Antonio Sarabia (72), writer (Tres pies al gato) (b. June 10, 1944).
- June 5
  - Eduardo Catarino Dircio, politician (Morena) from Tixtla de Guerrero municipality, Guerrero; killed by state police.
  - Eleazar Vargas Lara, community leader and politician from Iguala, Guerrero; murdered.
  - Ana Winocur (44), journalist; pancreatitis (b. October 1972).
- June 6 – Jorge Ortiz Murray, leader of fishermen in Mazatlan; heart attack.
- June 8
  - Antonio Medellín, 75, Mexican actor (Tres veces Ana, Porque el amor manda, Cuando me enamoro).
  - Elmer Arias Gutiérrez (24), músician; murdered.
  - Crisóforo Otero Heredia, politician (PRD), former mayor of Tecpan de Galeana, Guerrero (2012-2015); murdered.
- June 30 – Ramiro Alejandro Celis, 25, bullfighter, gored.
- June 10 – Luis Fuentes Molinar, 89, journalist and politician (PRI), former mayor of Chihuahua (1977-1980) and federal Deputy (1973-1976).
- June 11 – Radamés Díaz Meza, Culiacán, Sinaloa, businessman; murdered.
- June 15 – Raúl Miranda Valencia, 48, lawyer and public servant from Michoacan; murdered.
- June 17 – Luis Rey Sifuentes, politician (Morena) from Chihuahua; shot.
- June 21 – Ulises Hueto Elizalde ("El Chispa") (33), boxer from Mexico City; murdered.
- June 23 – Eva Castañeda Cortés (87), social activist (Unión de Comuneros Emiliano Zapata) from Morelia, Michoacan.
- June 24
  - Camilo Juan Castagne Velazco, police commissioner of La Antigua, Veracruz; murdered alongside another police officer.
  - Jorge Humberto Higareda Magaña (75), businessman and leader of truckers in Puebla (b. 1942).
- June 26
  - Salvador Adame, journalist from Gabriel Zamora, Michoacan; murdered (found dead this date).
  - Alejandro Zepeda Ortiz (27), journalist and reporter from Chiapas; suicide.
- June 27
  - Pablo Martín Obregón, journalist (Televisa) from Chilpancingo, Guerrero; suicide (hanging).
  - Valentín Pimstein 91, Chilean-born television producer (Televisa) who lived in Mexico (b. August 9, 1925).
- June 29
  - Rodolfo Díaz ("Chivo") (78), boxer and trainer; diabetes.
  - Vinicio Ferrer Merino, polítician, mayor of San Mateo Sindihui, Oaxaca; killed during agrarian conflict.
  - Demetrio Jaime Martínez Benítez, politician, former mayor of San Francisco Cahuacúa, Oaxaca; killed during agrarian conflict.
  - Meztli Sarabia Reyna, activist (Unión Popular de Vendedores Ambulantes (UPVA) “28 de Octubre”) from Puebla; murdered.
- June 30 – Ramiro Alejandro Celis, 25, bullfighter, gored.

=== July ===
- July 1
  - Gregorio Delgadillo Santos (38), polítician (Morena) from Ciudad Nezahualcóyotl; murdered.
  - Simón Flores Ramón, polítician and government worker from Atlacomulco, State of Mexico; electrical discharge.
- July 2
  - Martín Feregrino Quiróz (27), lawyer and educator (Autonomous University of Queretaro); breathing problems.
  - Rodrigo D Garay, actor.
- July 3 – José Luis Cuevas, 83, artist.
- July 4 – Walter González Arriaga, polítician; murdered.
- July 5 – Luis López Villa (71), Catholic priest from Los Reyes La Paz, State of Mexico; throat slit.
- July 6
  - David Alonso López, 39, boxer, shot.
  - Mariano Herrán Salvatti (68), lawyer and civil servant; liver condition.
  - Héctor Villasana Rosales (78), lawyer and académic; anemia.
- July 7
  - Sergio Fuentes Gutiérrez, lawyer and researcher.
  - Jorge Juan Rodriguez Reyes, labor leader; automobile accident.
- July 8 – Guadalupe Baltazar Rojas, chronicler and craftswoman from Ixtenco, Tlaxcala.
- July 9 – Diego Zavala Pérez (85), lawyer, académic, and polítician, father of Margarita Zavala; heart attack.
- July 10 – Pedro Joaquín Alberto Cárdenas Segura, músician, composer, and orquestra director.
- July 13 – Héctor Lechuga, 88, comedian, actor and radio personality (México 2000), heart attack.
- July 14
  - René Chávez (69), baseball player.
  - Carlos Torres González, UANL High School principal; murdered.
  - Elías Sergio Treviño Earnshaw, former mayor of Monclova, Coahuila.
- July 17 – Martha Nava (75), Mexico's best female basketball player.
- July 18
  - Irma Camacho García (67), polítician (substitute mayor of Temixco, Morelos, 2016–2017); cardiorespiratory arrest.
  - Erika Mireles, voice actress ("The Simpsons" and "Doña Clotilde").
- July 19 – Hortensia de la Concepción Orozco Tejada, polítician; stroke.
- July 20 – Felipe de Jesús Pérez Luna (48), criminal; shot by police.
- July 21 – Ángel Padilla, músician (harp player).

July 22

  - Juan Bernardo Ruvalcaba, boxer and trainer; killed during robbery.
  - José Arturo Tolosa Campos (59), Sinaloa photojournalist (El Debate); accidente de tránsito.
- July 23 – Erwin Trejo (47), singer (Juan Gabriel's twin); murdered.
- July 24
  - Juan Figueroa Fuentes, polítician (PRD) and public official; heart attack.
  - Luis Gimeno, Uruguayan emigrant actor (Mañana es para siempre) (b. 1927).
- July 25
  - Gerardo Gallardo (49), actor ("Chef Ornica") (b. 1967).
  - David Vera Jiménez (54), public servant in Mexico City; heart attack.
- July 26
  - Saúl Escudero Pozos (48), polítician and public servant; cáncer.
  - Ramón Xirau, 93, Spanish-born Mexican poet, philosopher and literary critic.
- July 28 – Luis Arturo Porras Aceves (78), journalist and reporter (El Heraldo de Chihuahua) (b. 1939).
- July 31
  - Lorenzo Arroyo, immigration activist; amyloidosis.
  - Baltazar Maldonado Rosales (55), polítician (former mayor of Apizaco Municipality, Tlaxcala; renal insufficiency and cáncer (b. 1961).
  - Luciano Rivera, journalist and reporter ("Dictamen" and TV channel CNR (176)) in Mexicali; murdered.
  - José Trinidad Ventura González (42), Presbyterian Church elder in Orizaba.

=== August ===
- August 2
  - José Miguel Machorro Alcalá, Catholic priest; stabbed in Mexico City Metropolitan Cathedral.
  - Edmundo Ortega, musician (bass player) and composer; heart attack.
- August 4 – Roberto Corvera Guzmán, rector of Universidad Angelópolis in Angelópolis, Puebla; shot.
- August 5 – Marcelino Perelló Valls (73), mathematician, academic, and former student activist (b. 1944).
- August 6
  - Víctor Manuel Cárdenas Morales (65), writer and poet; stroke (b. 1952).
  - Pedro Manterola Sáinz (52), psychologist, politician, and public official from Veracruz; heart attack (b. 1965).
  - Virgilio Ruiz García, musician from Oaxaca; murdered.
- August 8
  - Ramón Ángulo Santos (70), politician former mayor of Angostura Municipality, Sinaloa; cardiac arrest.
  - Jaime Avilés Iturbe (63), journalist (Unomásuno) and columnist (La Jornada and Proceso); lung cancer.
  - Rius, 83, political cartoonist (b. June 20, 1934)
- August 11 – Eugenio Polgovsky, 40, filmmaker (winner of 4 Ariel Awards).
- August 12 – César Osuna Aguirre, baseball player (Venados de Mazatlán); murdered.
- August 15 – Rafael Ramírez Sánchez, politician, former mayor of Sahuayo, Michoacán; kidnapped and murdered.
- August 16 – Jesús Aranda, journalist (La Jornada) (b. 1963).
- August 20
  - Jerónimo González Huerta (71), artist (b. 1946).
  - Valdemar Jiménez Solís (90), poet, académic, and cultural journalist (b. 1926).
  - Aurora Meza Calles (54), Kumeyaay social activist and translator; pancreatitis.
  - Martín Rocha Hernández (56), Durango physician and labor leader; lung cancer.
- August 21
  - Miguel Mike" Orpinel Mendoza, sportscaster; heart attack.
  - Salomon Robbins (71), athlete and trainer.
- August 22
  - Luis Muruato Puente (88), baseball player (Algodoneros de Unión Laguna).
  - Cándido Ríos Vásquez, journalist from Veracruz; murdered.
- August 23
  - Mauricio Delfín Domínguez, politician from Córdoba, Veracruz; suicide.
  - Ricardo Murguía (68), singer (Yo soy tu amigo fiel), musician, and voice actor (b. 1949).
- August 24
  - Jorge Estrada Álvarez, architect and director or School of Architecture at Autonomous University of Sinaloa.
  - Genaro Moreno, children's television broadcaster.
- August 26
  - Edgar Gil Yoguez (55), politician, former mayor of Venustiano Carranza, Michoacán; heart attack.
  - Alicia Juárez (67), singer; heart attack (b. 1950).
  - Bertha Elisa Medina Parra, politician and public servant, former mayor of Mocorito Municipality, Sinaloa.
- August 27
  - Bernardino Cruz Rivas, politician; cardiac arrest.
  - Juan Santos Vásquez, politician, former mayor of San Esteban Amatlán, Oaxaca; run over by a car.
- August 29 – Hugo Castro Rosado, businessperson and politician, former mayor of La Antigua, Veracruz; liver failure.
- August 30
  - Efrain Loza, 78, 1964 Summer Olympics soccer player.
  - José Manuel García León, Tabasco musician; pulmonary emphysema.
- August 31 – Nadia Stankovitch (93), Serbian-born Mexican pianist; heart attack (b. 1924).

=== September ===
- September 2
  - Gabriela del Valle, actress (Maten a la hiena).
  - Alejo García García, académic (Instituto Universitario Londres), public servant, and chef.
  - Oscar Javier González Torres ("El Espectaculo"), 62, músician, actor y comedian; cáncer of the páncreas.
  - Marisela Ortega Lozano, journalist ("El Paso Times," "El Diario de El Paso," and Reforma); cáncer.
- September 3 – Sugar Ramos, 75, Cuban-Mexican Hall of Fame boxer, WBA/WBC featherweight champion (1963–1964), cancer (b. December 2, 1941).
- September 4 – José Trinidad Sepúlveda Ruiz-Velasco, 96, Roman Catholic prelate, Bishop of Tuxtla (1965–1988) and San Juan de los Lagos (1988–1999), respiratory complications (b. March 30, 1921).
- September 5 – José Durán González, 67, polítician, former mayor of Pueblo Nuevo, Guanajuato; murdered.
- September 6 – Raúl Castañeda (34), boxer; murdered (b. 1982).
- September 11
  - Carlos Galván Tello (63), agronomy engineer and public servant (National Forestry Commission of Mexico in Coahuila; cáncer.
  - Carlos Muñoz Portal (37), assistant television producer ("Narcos" on Netflix); murdered.
- September 12 – Álvaro Matute Aguirre (74), historian (UNAM) (b. April 19, 1943).
- September 27 – Hiromi Hayakawa, 34, Japanese-born Mexican actress (El Chema) and singer (La Academia), liver hemorrhage during childbirth.
- September 28 – Karla Luna (38), actress (Las Lavanderas) and singer; cancer (b. September 25, 1979).

=== October ===
- October 2 – Evangelina Elizondo, 88, actress (Premio Arlequín 2014; voice of Cinderella in the Walt Disney film), natural causes (b. 1929).
- October 4 – Luis de la Hidalga y Enríquez (93), lawyer, public servant, writer ("El Violador de la Rosa", "La Venganza de Lady Wilshire"), and académic (b. December 12, 1923).
- October 5 – Édgar Esqueda, journalist (Vox Populi); murdered.
- October 6 – Stalin Sánchez, mayor of Paracho de Verduzco, Michoacan; murdered.
- October 10 – Manuel Hernández Pasión, mayor of Huitzilan de Serdán, Puebla; murdered along with his wife and a security guard.
- October 15 – Gonzalo Martínez Corbalá, engineer, ambassador, politician (PRI), Senator (1982–1988), governor of San Luis Potosi (1991-1992); (b. March 10, 1928).
- October 16 – Cecilia Méndez, 60, radio announcer in Zapopan, Puebla; murdered.
- October 19
  - Gaspar Jesús Azcorra Alejos (75), Yucatan priest, writer, and poet (b. 1942).
  - Julio Chávez Hernández, polítician (PT) and social activist in Veracruz.
- October 20 – Crispín Gutiérrez Moreno, politician (PRI), rancher, and mayor of Ixtlahuacán, Colima; murdered.
- October 21 – Rosaura Barahona, 75, journalist (El Norte) and feminist writer, pulmonary disease.

=== November ===
- November 1 – Ignacio Villanueva (86), priest from the Roman Catholic Diocese of Ciudad Juárez.
- November 6 – Miguel Espinosa "Armillita" (59), bullfighter from Aguascalientes City (b. September 19, 1958).
- November 11
  - Maru Dueñas (50), actress, director, and theater producer; auto accident (b. October 3, 1967).
  - Claudio Reyes Rubio, 53, TV director (Televisa); auto accident; (b. August 5, 1964).
- November 13 – Miguel Hernández Urbán, painter and sculptor from Tultepec, State of Mexico
- November 19 – Claudio Báez, 69, actor and singer.
- November 20 – Silvestre de la Toba Camacho, 47, Ombudsman of the Human Rights Commission in Baja California Sur; murdered alongside his son Fernando de la Toba Lucero.
- November 25
  - Jesús Gómez, 76, equestrian, Olympic bronze medalist (1980).
  - Rosario Green, 76, economist, diplomat and politician, Minister for Foreign Affairs (1998–2000) and Senator (2006–2012).
  - Rosendo Huesca Pacheco, 85, Roman Catholic prelate, Archbishop of Puebla de los Ángeles (1977–2009).
- November 26
  - Vicente García Bernal, 88, Roman Catholic prelate, Bishop of Ciudad Obregón (1988–2005).
  - Óscar Lara Aréchiga, 65, politician.
- November 28 – Rafael Llano Cifuentes, 84, Mexican-born Brazilian Roman Catholic prelate, Bishop of Nova Friburgo (2004–2010).
- November 29
  - Evelia Lopez Vassallo (82), social activist (Frente Cívico) from Tonalá, Chiapas; long-time illness.
  - María Angélica Luna Parra, polítician, public servant ("Instituto Nacional de Desarrollo Social"), and social activist.

=== December ===
- December 5 – Iliana Godoy Patiño (65), narrator, researcher, and poet ("Contralianza" and "Mastil en Tierra") (b. January 22, 1952).
- December 8 – Juan Celada Salmón, 101, engineer (Ternium) and inventor (Proceso HYL) (b. February 14, 1916).
- December 11 – Jorge Schiaffino Isunza, 70, politician, member of the Chamber of Deputies (1988–1991) (b. April 10, 1947).
- December 14 – Javier Villalobos Jaramillo (76), architect, restaurer and académic (b. April 30, 1941).
- December 15 – Rubén Pato Soria, 75, professional wrestler.
- December 18
  - Emilio Alvarado Badillo (56), photographer, civil engineer, public servant and académic (ITESM, State of Mexico) (b. 1951).
  - Ricardo Miledi (90), neuro-scientist (Academia Mexicana de Ciencias y de la Academia Nacional de Medicina de México) (b. September 15, 1927).
  - Ricardo Suriano (67), journalist (Charamupa) from Tonalá, Chiapas.
- December 19
  - Gumaro Pérez Aguilando (34), journalist and reporter (La Voz del Sur) in Acayucan, Veracruz; murdered.
  - Fernando Villares Moreno ("Zorro"), 62, singer ("Fugitivo"); stroke.
- December 20 – Jesús Castillo Rangel (121), Revolutionary and farmer, Mexico's oldest man; respiratory insufficiency and pneumonia.(b. October 24, 1896).
- December 24
  - Alejandro León Cázarez, baseball journalist and columnist (La Aficion).
  - Salvador Magaña Martínez, social leader and activist in La Huerta, Jalisco, polítician (Citizens' Movement); murdered.
  - Sergio Magaña Martínez, 68, polítician (PRI), Senator (1994–2000), businessman, former mayor of Morelia, Michoacan (1993); heart attack (b. December 2, 1949).
  - José Miguel Rodríguez Asaf (54), businessman (Grupo de Apoyo al Desarrollo de IZAMAL y sus Comisarias), polítician, former mayor of Izamal Municipality.
  - Juan Silveti Reynoso (88), bullfighter; lung disease (b. October 5, 1929).
- December 25
  - Rudy Casanova (50), Cuban-born Mexican actor (Amores con trampa and Hasta el fin del mundo); breathing problems (b. November 3, 1967).
  - Alfredo Guzman Guzman, former mayor of Purísima del Rincón, Guanajuato (1977-1979).
  - José Luis Sánchez Camacho (85), músician.
- December 28
  - David Antón (93), scenographer and costume designer (b. 1924).
  - Saúl Galindo Plazola, polítician (PRD), former mayor of Tomatlán (2013-2015), Jalisco; murdered.
  - Arturo Gómez Pérez, polítician mayor of Petatlán, Guerrero; murdered.
  - Luis Abraham González Contreras (31), photographer y reporter; murdered.
  - Gerardo Olavarrieta León, hotel owner ("Suites Kokai", "Plaza Kokai", and "Condominios Kokai") in Cancun, Quintana Roo.
  - Mario Stern (81), composer and académic (b. 1936).
- December 31
  - Regino Díaz Redondo, journalist (Excélsior).
  - Juan González Gómez ("Juan Cotz"), 63, painter from San Juan Chamula, Chiapas (b. June 24, 1954).

== See also ==
- Timeline of Mexican history
