= Reforma (newspaper) =

Mexican daily newspaper

- Type: Daily newspaper
- Format: Broadsheet
- Owner: Grupo Reforma
- Editor: Juan Pardinas
- Founded: 1993; 33 years ago
- Language: Spanish
- Headquarters: Washington 629 Ote. 64000 Monterrey, Nuevo León, Mexico
- Sister newspapers: El Norte
- Website: reforma.com

Reforma is a Mexican newspaper based in Mexico City. It has 276,700 readers in Mexico City. The paper shares content with other papers in its parent newsgroup Grupo Reforma. Reforma is named after the Mexico City avenue of the same name, Paseo de la Reforma, which is in turn named after "La Reforma", a series of liberal reforms undertaken by the country in the mid-19th century.

The newspaper emphasizes its design, variety of columnists, and editorials that denounce political corruption.

The paper features weekly translations from selected articles of local interest from US and other foreign newspapers. These include The New York Times, The Wall Street Journal and the People's Daily. The Sunday edition of Reforma formerly included a supplemental magazine titled Top Magazzine, which covered celebrity gossip, Hollywood previews and interviews.

== History ==
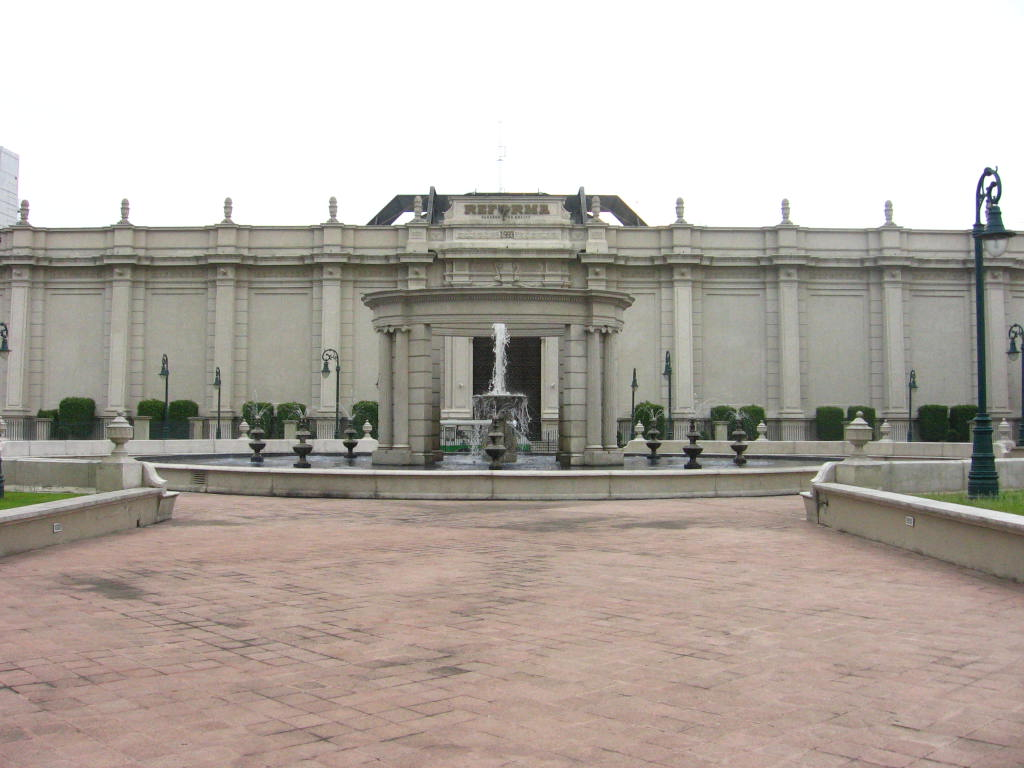
Reforma's headquarters in Mexico City

Reforma was launched in Mexico City in November 1993 by Alejandro Junco de la Vega as an offshoot of his successful Monterrey paper, El Norte. Soon after the paper's launch, he brought Reforma and El Norte together with his other newspapers--El Sol and Metro—to unite them under a single publishing company, which he named Grupo Reforma.

Like Grupo Reforma's other publications, Reforma took great pains to separate its commercial division from its journalism division. Journalists were forbidden from taking bribes and the paper was forbidden from selling advertising space to the subjects of its news stories.

Junco believed that commercial success through selling newspapers and advertising was a fundamental aspect to establishing free press. To this end, he began offering food and fashion sections in Reforma and the newspaper became popular among the middle class.

=== A new journalism model ===
In 1991, Junco implemented a model of community editorial boards that would eventually become the standard for Grupo Reforma. He invited hundreds of readers, thought leaders, and experts to participate in editorial boards that helped set the newspapers' editorial agenda. Not only did this promote community involvement in civic matters, but it also ensured a diversity of viewpoints. Junco has described the editorial boards as promoting democracy and objectivity because its members are politically balanced and come from a wide variety of backgrounds. According to Junco, the system puts the power in the hands of the readers.

=== Independent distribution ===
In October 1994, Mexico City's government-affiliated newspaper carrier union boycotted delivery of Reforma. Junco led his reporters in the streets to sell the papers themselves. Junco also hired his own vendors to create an independent distribution system in Mexico City.

=== Transparency laws and judicial reform ===
In the early 2000s, Junco and the staff of Reforma worked with the Oaxaca Group (an initiative that brought together media outlets, legal experts, academics, and NGOs) to convince Mexico's political leaders to approve a landmark federal transparency law. The freedom-of-information legislation gave journalists, investigators, and ordinary citizens access to government information that had been denied to them for decades.

Reforma was also part of a campaign against government censorship during the early 2000s. The paper publicly denounced defamation charges that government officials (such as former Mexico City Mayor Rosario Robles) had levied against Junco and his reporters. These efforts persuaded legislators to decriminalize the expression of ideas.

The news coverage provided by Reforma and other Grupo Reforma publications eventually persuaded Mexican legislators to approve a 2008 judicial reform that instituted public trials and put greater emphasis on due process rights.

== Awards ==
In 2001, Junco and Reforma were awarded Spain's Ortega y Gasset Award for Journalism, which is presented annually to journalists whose work has demonstrated a "remarkable defense of freedom, independence, and professional rigor."

== Accusations of bias ==
The newspaper insists, like the other publications of the editorial group, that it is non-partisan, with an editorial style favoring an ostensibly neutral point of view and publishing opinions from journalists of all political positions (such as Miguel Ángel Granados Chapa from the left, and Sergio Sarmiento from the right). Additionally, the newspaper alleges to have many fail-safes in place to prevent any partisan point of view.

Despite its avowed independent editorial style, Reforma has been labeled as a right-wing newspaper in references by The Guardian, the Clarin, the San Antonio Express-News, the University of Miami school of communication and the Princeton Progressive Nation. Mexican president Andrés Manuel López Obrador (as a presidential candidate in 2005) also accused the paper of this bias, and even denounced the paper of being a "press bulletin for the PAN".

== Notable columnists ==
- Carmen Aristegui, political commentator
- Denise Dresser, political analyst
- Enrique Krauze, historian
- Everardo Elizondo, economist
- Gabriel Zaid, writer and poet
- Hector Zagal, philosopher.
- Homero Aridjis, poet, environmentalist
- Jorge G. Castañeda, intellectual, academic, and former Secretary of Foreign Affairs.
- José Luis Lezama, intellectual, environmentalist
- Juan Villoro, writer
- Mario Vargas Llosa, novelist
- Paco Calderón, political cartoonist
- Sergio Aguayo, political analyst

== Affiliations ==
Reforma is part of the Grupo Reforma. Grupo Reforma is a collection of Mexican media outlets. Within Grupo Reforma, Reforma is an offshoot of El Norte.

== Famous sections ==
- Mario Netas is an animated cartoon airing weekly and depicting a talk show about a dummy named Mario who invites Mexican and foreign newsmakers to explain current news.

== See also ==
- List of newspapers in Mexico
- El Deforma, a parody website named after the newspaper
