= María de Alva =

Mexican novelist

Maria de Alva Levy
- Born: January 23, 1969 (age 57); Monterrey, Mexico
- Education: Monterrey Institute of Technology and Higher Education; University of California, Los Angeles
- Occupation: Writer

Maria de Alva Levy (born January 23, 1969, in Monterrey, Mexico) is a Mexican novelist. Two of her novels have been finalists for the award Fernando Lara de Novela in Spain.

== Life ==
Maria de Alva was born in Monterrey, Nuevo León in Mexico. She graduated from ITESM with the degree in Hispanic Literature in 1990. Additionally, she has two master's degrees, one in Latin American Studies at the UCLA in 1993. Her second degree was in Education at ITESM in 2000. She continued studying and obtained her PhD in Humanistic Studies at ITESM in 2012 with a dissertation entitled Memory and Writing Body.

Between 1993 and 1995, she worked as a reporter for the newspapers: Reforma and El Norte. Since 1996 she has worked for ITESM, where she is currently Head of the bachelor's degree in Hispanic Literature. She has also led creative writing workshops at Casa de la Cultura in Nuevo León, Mexico. She has participated in several academic conferences at universities such as UNAM, Brown University, Texas University, among others.

== Published works ==
Maria de Alva has been a finalist for the Lara de Novela award of Spain twice. Her first nomination was in 2004 for her book A través de la ventana (Through the Window) and in 2009 for her novel Antes del olvido (Before Oblivion).

Her book A través de la ventana, describes how Ida, who is the main character, together with her family are trying to escape not only from war during the Mexican Revolution, but also from German traditionalism and exile in Mexico. They were the first Jewish family to come to Monterrey, Mexico. This book was a finalist because it represents the cruelty, reality, necessity, hope and fear while searching for a better life. It also portrays issues like family, sickness, pain, exile and memory. The novel uses three types of narrators, a diary in the first person, a recollection in the second person and a third person that tells most of the story.

Her most recent book Lo que guarda el río (What the river Keeps) was inspired by the deaths of two students from Tecnológico de Monterrey, where she works, due to narco violence. Also it has to do with the disaster brought upon the city of Monterrey by Hurricane Alex in 2010. The author's purpose is to show through characters of different social classes how violence and nature force interactions among them even if in the end each separate once again.
