= Mario Netas =

Animated web series

Mario Netas is an internet animated cartoon by Pacasso airing weekly in the online website of the Mexican newspaper Reforma. The cartoon depicts a talk show hosted by a wooden dummy named Mario inviting Mexican and foreign newsmakers to explain current news. It was first aired on March 16, 2005. On April 14th, 2010 a new voice of Mario Netas was broadcast producing outrage of his followers.

Starting July 4, 2006 the show airs on Tuesdays (rather than Wednesdays).

== Name of the show ==
The name of the show is a play on words. Mario is the name of the host of the show, and Netas is a Mexican Spanish slang for truth, so roughly translated the show's name would be "Mario's truths". However, Marionetas is also the Spanish word for marionettes. Pacasso and Berenice Loaeza were the producers of the show.

== Characters ==
Mario Netas
Mario Netas is a wooden dummy and host of the show. He often brags in a humorous way about sleeping with a large number of women, especially at the beginning of the show. He usually makes fun of guests and criticizes anything on the show he doesn't like (e.g. "Cartas a Marito" section). He hates being called Marito (Little Mario), but this doesn't keep some guests like Andrés Manuel López Obrador and Marta Sahagún, from calling him that.

El Buen Bob
"Good" Bob is the puppeteer who controls Mario. He is somewhat fat, wears a green mask and only rarely moves or speaks. He never replies back whenever he's asked his opinion by Mario, creating an awkward silence which leads Mario to roll his eyes and coldly say "se" ("yeah, right"). Bob is said to have a fan club, and is the target of many girls' affection.

Don Polo
Don Polo is an old worker in the set of the show. Although he usually works as the only cabin crew member, he has sometimes covered for Mario as the host when the latter has been out on vacation. He has shown good skills on the use of the sound censorship button when a guest begins to say profanities, skill that was put to test when Cuauhtémoc Blanco and, more recently, Ana Guevara were interviewed. In an attempt to imitate Mario and Bob's routine, he made up a puppet of his own named "Polito" (Little Polo). However, his abilities as a ventriloquist were nowhere to be seen.

Nicanor
Nicanor was first introduced in the Marta Sahagún episode, as a "ropavejero" (a rag and bones man), a low-class Mexican clothes "expert." His first appearance was so popular that he became a recurring character. Apparently, Nicanor spends most of his time in the studio as a handyman, for he is randomly introduced in every episode. He once hosted a section of his own named "Cartas a Marito" (Letters to Marito), in which fans would send letters mail to express their opinion on the show and its characters. He suffered a mysterious accident just before the beginning of a show which left him in a coma. He later reappeared again, but his section was canceled. He speaks with a common Mexico City accent. Like Don Polo (whose bombed jokes simply did not appeal to the producer of the show), he hosted the show while Mario and Bob were on vacation. He has managed to interview a couple of guests when Mario and Bob are not around, like Saddam Hussein. On that same episode we got to meet his aunt, the psychic Madame Wendolyn (her real name is Anastasia). Another relative that has also appeared on the show is Cyber-Carlos, Nicanor's cousin. He is supposed to be the electronic voice that reads out loud the news from Reforma.

== Sections of the Show ==
The Spicy Comment
While the curtain raises Mario tells Bob something related to an adventure with women. There is always a sex pun hidden in the story. Suddenly he notices that the curtain is raised and he breaks to welcome the viewers to the show. On August 12, 2008, the spicy comment was replaced with a message from Mario Netas staff repudiating crime in Mexico where Good Bob says "Ya Basta!" (Enough!) for the shock of all the staff (and of the audience).

The Interview
The interview is the section on the show when the politicians or other invited characters appear. It is often the longest part of the show, but some interviews are really short.

The Picture of the Week
A picture is shown and Mario makes fun of it in some way.

The Movie Section
This is a section where Mario reviews a movie chosen by him based on the "Muvimetre", a scale that goes from Terrible to Excellent.

Cartas a Marito (September 12, 2006 - November 28, 2006)
A fan mail section once hosted by Nicanor. Beginning with the episode of October 31, 2006 the letters were displayed on a "manta". Mario hated this section, because in most letters fans preferred other characters better than him. The section was canceled after Nicanor fell down from a stair while writing it. The last letter was read by Mario.

== Bob's stillness ==
Since the show is conducted by Mario Netas, throughout most of the shows Bob remains still. As of today, there has been only one show in which Bob has spoken or made a sound. Nonetheless, there a couple episodes where Bob moves or reacts to something said on the show.

March 16, 2005
Bob interrupts Mario's opening comment with the words "estamos al aire" (we're on air), to hint that they were making small talk when the curtain was surprisingly lifted and the show began.

June 26, 2005
Bob reaches Mario a phone.

July 5, 2005
As the contestant Jolette Hernandez of the TV show La Academia (something similar to American Idol) sings, Bob's contact lenses break.

September 27, 2005
While reviewing the movie Wedding Crashers, Mario comments that "desperate singles" are Bob's specialty, Bob pushes Mario and lets him fall down. Mario breaks his right arm, and during the following two shows he is seen wearing a bandage on it.

August 29, 2006
During the interview with Andrés Manuel López Obrador, they play a sad song due to the way he lost the elections, Bob's eyes become glassy and almost sheds a tear.

July 17, 2007
After Mario refers to sentimental Harry Potter fans being moved by Harry's first kiss, Bob sheds a tear.

August 12, 2008
In this show, the Spicy Comment was substituted by a message from Mario and the rest of the staff repudiating crime in Mexico (after the kidnapping and killing of Fernando Marti). To everyone's amazement, Bob says "¡Ya basta!" (Enough!). At the end of show Mario tells to Bob "I better not ask you how the show went, otherwise you might speak again".

== Current state of the show ==
=== Controversy of April 2010 ===
As of 14 April 2010 the voice of Mario was replaced, the sudden change without warning to the fans was coldly received. "Pacasso" alias of Francisco J. Almaraz, suddenly left the show after a week of absence (during the Easter holidays) to join the cast of Joaquín López Dóriga.

He now participates in a segment known as "Terapia Intensiva" (Intensive Care) and consists of a similar format as that of Mario Netas, but the main character is a doctor. The situation was made even worse by the lack of public response from the newspaper "Reforma" after the universal reaction from fans repudiating the deception and noting that the show was a terrible unfunny imitation of the original.

=== Reception of "Terapia Intensiva" ===
At the beginning, the opinions of the new show were divided, but the new format became a success, now with more than a 60 chapters, Terapia Intensiva is a reference in politics and news humor. Currently the show, and its spin-off named "Terapia Intensiva: Unidad de Quemados", rank at the top 10 of the iTunes podcast list.
