= Pacasso =

- Born: Francisco Javier Almaraz; 20th Century; Mexico City, Mexico
- Other names: Pacasso; Dr. Netas
- Education: Intercontinental University; Michigan State University
- Occupations: Cartoonist, animator, and comedian
- Years active: 1993 - present
- Employer(s): Grupo Reforma (1993 - 2022) Televisa (2010 - 2018) LatinUS (since 2021)
- Known for: Social commentary, Political satire
- Notable work: Intensive Therapy; Mario Netas
- Movement: Minimalism
- Spouse: Berenice Loaeza
- Website: https://drnetas.com/

Francisco Almaraz (D.F., Mexico), better known as Pacasso or Doctor Netas, is a cartoonist, animator, and comedian. Known for his unique minimalist drawing style, he is a prominent figure in the realm of political cartoons in Mexican newspapers and animated series, especially Terapia Intensiva (Intensive Therapy) and Mario Netas.

== Biography ==
Pacasso began his career in 1993 as a journalist with Grupo Reforma, engaging in news coverage, interviews, and reporting. During his leisure, he created vignettes that depicted his daily experiences. His persistence in the field led to the publication of his first cartoon.

He later joined the Metro newspaper, where in 2005, he started a comic strip that also became an animated series, "Mario Netas", produced for Reforma. This series was active until 2013 and was revived in 2019.

In 2009, Pacasso collaborated with Joaquín López-Dóriga on the news program to present "Intensive Therapy," a project co-created with his wife and partner Berenice Loaeza. This series humorously informed patients waking from comas about the latest events in Mexico and around the world.

2019 marked the release of his first book, "Stand Up Comic," a pioneering blend of stand-up comedy and comic strips, with a foreword by Víctor Trujillo.

In 2020, he joined LatinUS, reviving Terapia Intensiva and launching a new series, Giro Positivo (Positive Turn.) Since February 23, 2022, he has co-hosted "Humores Perros" with fellow cartoonist Juan Alarcón, focusing on humor and caricature.

A significant chapter in his career unfolded on October 13, 2022, when Pacasso announced his departure from Reforma newspaper after a 30-year collaboration, transitioning to an independent cartoonist.

Pacasso draws inspiration from a range of cartoonists, including Gabriel Vargas, Quino, Jim Davis, and Charles M. Schulz. He describes himself as a doodler, a term that reflects his simple yet effective drawing and animation style, which aids him in rapidly developing a multitude of ideas.

== Works ==
=== Books ===
- Stand Up Comic Vol. 1 (2019)
- Dr. Netas Aislados (2020)
- Dr. Netas Aislados 2 (2021)
- Stand Up Comic Vol. 2 (2022)

=== Animation ===
- Mario Netas (2005 - 2013; 2019 - 2022)
- Terapia Intensiva (2010 - 2016; 2021 - present)
- Terapia Intensiva: Unidad de Quemados (2012 - 2019; 2021 - present)
- Driving Dr. Netas (2016; 2019 - presente)
- Palomitas de Microondas (2018 - 2019; 2022)
- Giro Positivo (2020 - 2023)
- El Podcast (Que no es Podcast) (2021 - present)
- Las Noticias de Berelú (2022)
- Todas estas noticias son Falsas (2022)
- ¡SiCierto! (2022 - 2023)
- Fuera del Aire (2022 - present)
