= Proceso =

Proceso may refer to:

- Proceso (magazine), a Mexican political magazine
- National Reorganization Process (Proceso de Reorganización Nacional), the dictatorship that ruled Argentina between 1976 and 1983
