= Paco Calderón =

Francisco "Paco" Calderón (born 1959 in Mexico City) is a Mexican political cartoonist. He currently draws for the newspapers that belong to the Grupo Reforma.

Calderón began his career in 1976 publishing in national newspaper El Heraldo de México and later in Excélsior. From 1983 he was published in Monterrey's El Norte and later other newspapers belonging to Grupo Reforma as well as Mural (Guadalajara), Palabra (Saltillo) and other newspapers and magazines.

Calderón has participated in several radio and television programs, narrating the biographies of historical figures as well as giving political commentary. He was awarded the National Journalism Prize in 1992 in the cartoon category and in 2004 for his editorial column "Calderón en Reforma".

In 1994 Madrid's University of Alcalá named him Honorary Professor "Humoris Causa"; that same year the United States' Library of Congress acquired ten of his books.

He has published several books, the most notable of which are El Descontrol de Precios ("The unbalance of prices") and La Lata del Domingo ("Sunday's Drag"). Unlike most Mexican cartoonists, Mr. Calderon sternly supports free market economics and policies.
