= Everardo Elizondo =

Mexican economist

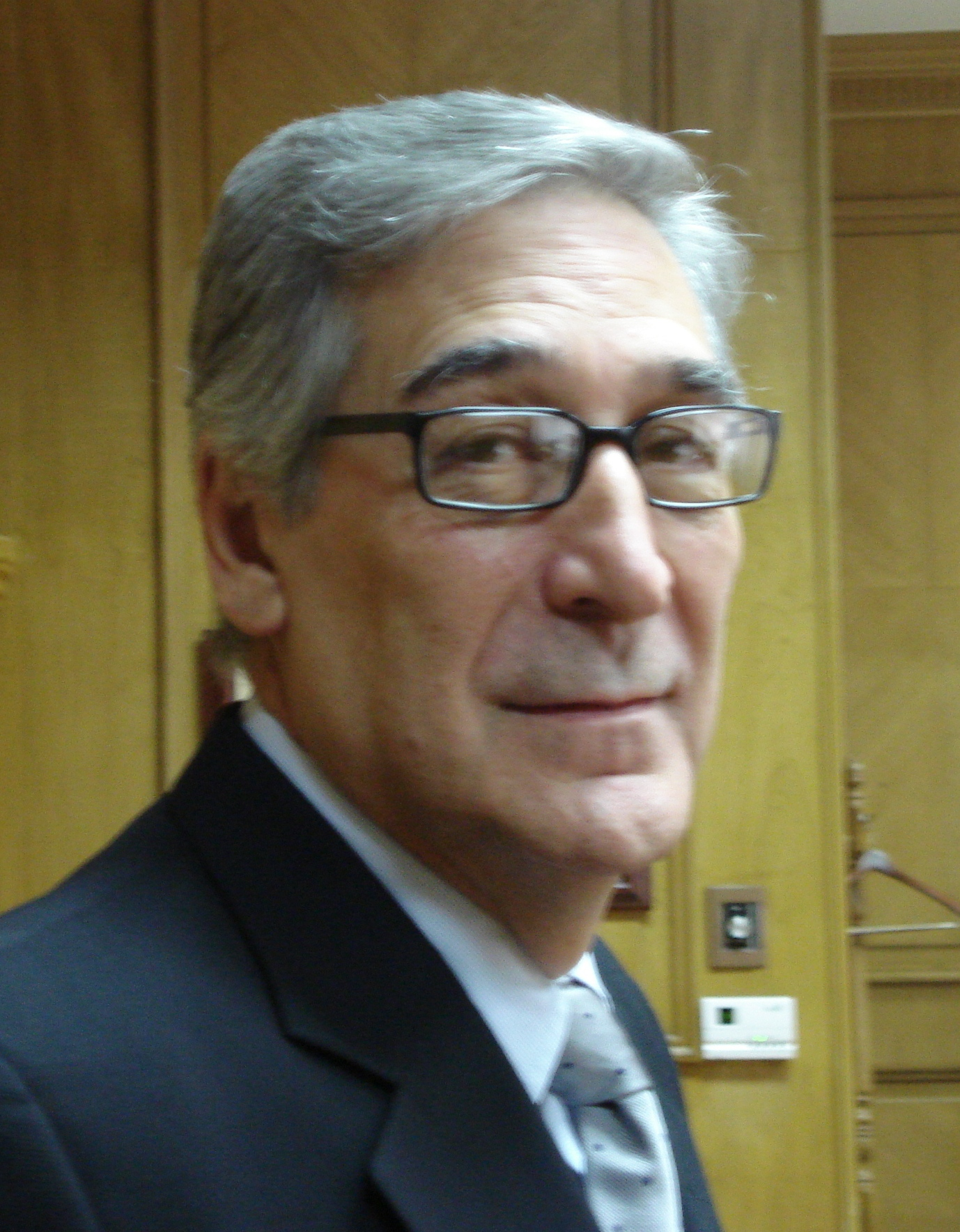
- Elizondo in 2008.
- Born: Everardo Elizondo Almaguer; December 9, 1943 (age 82); Linares, Nuevo León
- Education: Autonomous University of Nuevo Leon (UANL), University of Wisconsin–Madison
- Occupation: Economist

Everardo Elizondo Almaguer is a Mexican economist who has worked for private, public, and academic institutions. By senatorial appointment, he served as deputy governor of the Bank of Mexico —the country's central bank— from 1998 to 2008.

== Biography ==
He was born in Linares, Nuevo León. After earning a bachelor's degree with honors in Economics from the Autonomous University of Nuevo Leon (UANL), he graduated with both a master's degree and a Ph.D. in the same discipline at the University of Wisconsin–Madison in the United States. He also completed an International Tax Program diploma from Harvard Law School in 1972.

His professional career started in Monterrey, in the Department of Economic Studies of Compañía General de Acceptaciones, a private financial institution which later became Grupo Financiero Serfin (nowadays Banco Santander). From there, he moved to Grupo Alfa, a leader of the Mexican industry in the 1970s, where he served for eight years as director-general for Economic Studies. Afterwards, he created and led a private consultancy for nine years: Index, Economía Applicada. He also briefly collaborated as a consultant with the Nuevo León State Government during Sócrates Rizzo's administration. In 1992, he joined Grupo Financiero Bancomer (nowadays BBVA) as director of Economic Research.

In 1998, president Ernesto Zedillo invited him to be a member of the Board of Governors of the Bank of Mexico — the central bank— to take the position left by Francisco Gil Díaz as deputy governor. In 2000, the Senate approved his nomination by President Vicente Fox to undertake a full eight-year period, which ended on the last day of December 2008.

Elizondo was also a founder and head of the Graduate School of Economics at the Autonomous University of Nuevo Leon, which later became the Postgraduate Studies Division in Economics. He has lectured several courses there and, since 2009, at the Graduate School of Public Administration (EGAP) of the Monterrey Institute of Technology (ITESM). From 1982 to 1983 he visited the Institute for Latin American Studies at the University of Texas at Austin as a research fellow.

He has worked as an economics and finance columnist for more than 35 years, writing a weekly column that is simultaneously published at El Norte and Reforma, and makes eventual contributions to El Economista, academic books and periodicals. He has been a member of the board of directors of several Mexican institutions, such as Universidad Mexicana del Noreste, Grupo Senda, Farmacias Benavides and Grupo Financiero Banorte, where he is an independent advisor since 1 January 2010. He is also a frequent public speaker in Mexico and abroad.
