= Alejandro Junco de la Vega =

Mexican newspaper publisher

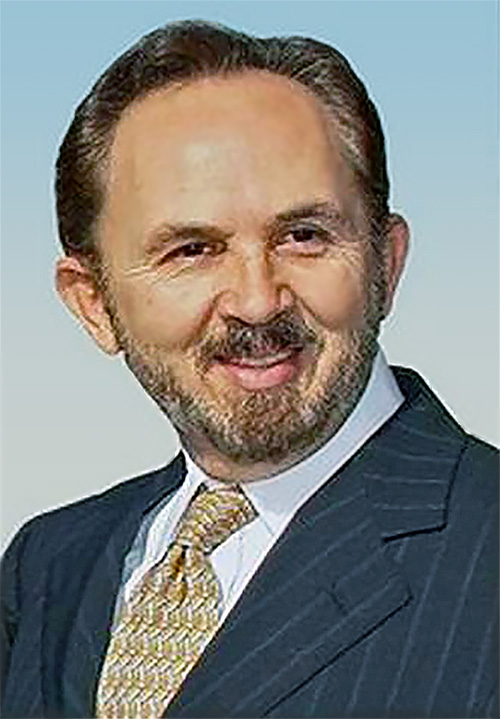
- Alejandro Junco de la Vega
- Born: August 28, 1948; Monterrey, Mexico
- Education: University of Texas at Austin
- Occupations: Businessman, journalist, newspaper publisher
- Spouse: Rosa Laura Elizondo

Alejandro Junco de la Vega (born August 28, 1948) is a Mexican journalist and newspaper publisher known for developing one of the largest and most powerful newspaper consortiums in Latin America. Junco is an outspoken advocate for journalistic integrity and has actively campaigned since the 1970s to reform journalism, strengthen press freedom, and promote public information laws in Mexico.

== Early life ==
Alejandro Junco de la Vega was born August 28, 1948, in Monterrey, Nuevo Leon, Mexico. He attended college at the University of Texas at Austin, earning a bachelor's degree in Journalism from the Moody College of Communication in 1969.

== Journalism career ==
=== El Norte ===
Junco worked in the newsroom and occupied different management positions at El Norte, a Monterrey newspaper founded in 1938 by his grandfather. When he became publisher of El Norte in 1973, Junco teamed with Mary Gardner—one of his former journalism professors at the University of Texas—to train reporters in journalistic techniques and ethics. Junco barred his reporters from taking bribes and from selling advertising to the subjects of their articles. These journalism standards would become the cornerstone for the growth of what would eventually become Grupo Reforma.

Shortly after Junco took over the leadership of El Norte, the newspaper found itself at odds with the Mexican government after its reporting and editorials angered President Luis Echeverría. The government attempted to shut down the newspaper by ordering PIPSA, Mexico's state-owned paper manufacturer, to stop selling newsprint to El Norte in what would come to be known as la "Guerra del Papel" (the "Paper War"). Despite the challenges, Junco and his team were able to keep El Norte in print by cutting the newspaper to 12 pages. Eventually, they were able to supplement their paper supply with imported newsprint. (In 1998, PIPSA was privatized by the Mexican government, allowing for the unrestricted import of newsprint.)

=== Grupo Reforma ===
With his success at El Norte and El Sol (another Monterrey newspaper founded by his grandfather in 1922), Junco was able to expand these two newspapers into a national chain and grow his team from 17 local reporters to 400 nationwide. In 1988, he launched Metro—a morning daily that offered information to readers in a tabloid format. Metro began in Monterrey, but was eventually expanded to Mexico City, Guadalajara, and Saltillo. In November 1993, Junco launched Reforma in Mexico City. At this point, he brought El Norte, El Sol, Metro, and Reforma together under a single publishing company, which he named Grupo Reforma. In November 1998, Junco unveiled Mural in Guadalajara, which was added to the Grupo Reforma lineup.

=== A new journalism model ===
In 1991, Junco implemented a model of community editorial boards that would eventually become standard for Grupo Reforma. He invited hundreds of readers, thought leaders, and experts to participate in editorial boards that helped set the newspapers' editorial agenda. Not only did this promote community involvement in civic matters, but it also ensured a diversity of viewpoints. Junco has described the editorial boards as promoting democracy and objectivity because its members are politically balanced and come from a wide variety of backgrounds. According to Junco, the system puts the power in the hands of the readers.

Junco also led a transformation in the way newspapers were distributed by challenging Mexico City's government-affiliated newspaper carrier union. When the union boycotted the delivery of Reforma newspapers in October 1994, Junco led his reporters in the streets to sell the papers themselves. He also hired his own vendors to create an independent distribution system.

Junco believed that commercial success through selling newspapers and advertising was a fundamental aspect to establishing a free press. To this end, he began offering food and fashion sections in Reforma and the newspaper became popular among the middle class.

=== Role in Mexico's democratization ===
In the 1990s, Grupo Reforma helped loosen the control and censorship that had long been imposed on the media by the Mexican government. The ethics and integrity that Junco brought to Mexican journalism, along with Grupo Reforma's commitment to exposing fraud and corruption, helped pave the way for democracy and put an end to 70 years of one-party rule in Mexico.

American academics and journalists have lauded Grupo Reforma for the role it has played in the advancement of independent journalism in Mexico over the last 40 years. Former IAPA president Edward Seaton says that Junco's newspapers "ushered in a different ethical standard for journalism" and states that "[w]ithout Alejandro Junco's contributions, I believe Mexico would not be the vibrant democracy it is today." Sallie Hughes, a professor of journalism at University of Miami, refers to Reforma as a "change leader" and says that its launch was "a watershed event in Mexico City journalism." And MIT professor Chapell Lawson has said that Junco's work "changed the rules of Mexican journalism."

=== Transparency laws and judicial reform ===
In the early 2000s, Junco helped lead the Oaxaca Group (an initiative that brought together media outlets, legal experts, academics, and NGOs) to convince Mexico's political leaders to approve a landmark federal transparency law. The freedom-of-information legislation gave journalists, investigators, and ordinary citizens access to government information that had been denied to them for decades.

Junco was also part of a campaign against government censorship throughout the early 2000s. He publicly denounced defamation charges that government officials (such as former Mexico City mayor Rosario Robles) had levied against him and his reporters. His efforts persuaded legislators to decriminalize the expression of ideas.

Grupo Reforma's news coverage and active participation through organized forums eventually persuaded Mexican legislators to approve a 2008 judicial reform that instituted public trials and put greater emphasis on due process rights.

=== Exposing drug-related crime ===
In 2006, President Felipe Calderón declared war on drug-trafficking and organized crime. The result was an escalating drug war that put many journalists in the crosshairs of criminal organizations. Junco and Grupo Reforma quickly found themselves at odds with the cartels. In 2008, as violence was escalating, Junco moved his family to Austin, Texas, to keep them safe. while he commuted to Monterrey to continue leading the company.

Between 2010 and 2012, five El Norte offices in Monterrey were attacked with grenades, bombs, and gunfire. In February 2011, cartel members kidnapped an El Norte distributor and burned the papers he was transporting. They instructed him to tell the newspaper's directors to "stop... or we're going to blow them up." Soon after that, three masked men entered the El Norte office in San Pedro Garza García and set it on fire.

In 2012, Junco told CNN that the Mexican government was refusing to investigate the cartel attacks on his newspapers. "We have the impression that local and federal authorities don't take the threats and attacks seriously," he said.

Despite the threats and the violence, Junco continued to publish articles exposing criminal activity. He often did so without reporters' bylines in order to ensure their safety. In a 2009 interview with Terry Gross, Junco stated, "We have every reason in the world to drop the stories, and we have every reason to look the other way, but we have resolved to continue to report all we know about the problem and continue to ask questions. And we hold to the faith that if we ask enough of them, we may finally come upon a solution."

== Awards ==
- 1991 Columbia University Graduate School of Journalism Maria Moors Cabot Award (to Junco and El Norte)
- 1992 IAPA Harmodio Arias Award for the Defense of Human Rights (to El Norte) for special team reporting on the long appeals processes of Mexicans sentenced to death in the United States
- 1992 IAPA Jose Antonio Miro Quesada Award for Community Involvement (to El Norte) for a report on a slum area in Monterrey cleaning up unsanitary conditions and working with authorities to make positive change
- 1993 "Honorary Citizen" of Austin, Texas (to Junco)
- 2000 University of Texas at Austin Distinguished Alumnus Award (to Junco)
- 2000 Michigan State University Honorary Degree of Doctor of Humanities (to Junco)
- 2001 Spain's Ortega y Gasset Award for Journalism (to Junco and Reforma)
- 2003 Spain's Luca de Tena Award (to Junco)
- 2005 University of Missouri-Columbia Missouri Honor Medal for Distinguished Service in Journalism (to Junco)
- 2009 Columbia University Graduate School of Journalism's Columbia Journalism Award (to Junco, who was the first foreign journalist to ever win)
- 2010 Laredo Chamber of Commerce South Texas Visionary Leader Award (to Junco)
- 2013 University of Texas at Austin Longhorn Legend Award (to Junco)

In 2010, the University of Texas at Austin's Institute of Latin American Studies announced the Alejandro Junco Scholarships for the Study of U.S.-Mexico Social Problems, an annual fellowship for UT graduate students to conduct summer research in Mexico and explore solutions to some of the region's most pressing social issues.
