= Fernando Bribiesca Sahagún =

Mexican politician

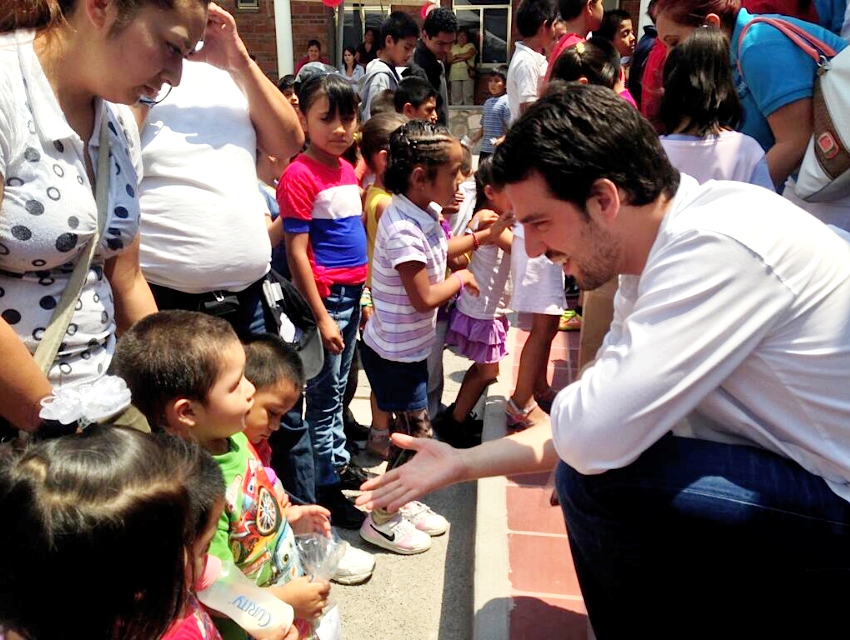
- Fernando Bribiesca in 2013.
- Born: 16 August 1981 (age 45); Zamora, Michoacán, Mexico
- Occupation: Deputy
- Political party: PANAL

Fernando Bribiesca Sahagún (born 16 August 1981) is a Mexican politician affiliated with the PANAL. As of 2013 he served as Deputy of the LXII Legislature of the Mexican Congress representing Guanajuato.

He is the younger son of the former First Lady Marta Sahagún.
