= Nadia Stankovich =

Yugoslav-born Mexican pianist, concert player and teacher

Nadia Stankovich also known as Nadia Stankovitch (born February 24, 1924 – Mexico City, August 30, 2017) was a Yugoslav-born Mexican pianist, concert player and teacher, highlighted by the interpretation of the works of Mexican composers as Juventino Rosas and Ricardo Castro.

== Career ==
Stankovich born in Belgrade, at the time Kingdom of Yugoslavia in 1924. She studied at the University of Music and Performing Arts Vienna with Emil von Sauer, a Franz Liszt disciple being a soloist in the Mozarteum Orchestra Salzburg. She escaped from Yugoslavia in 1950 and settled her exile in Mexico. As a concert artist, Stankovich toured in America, Asia and Europe concert halls. In Mexico she was conducted by directors such as Luis Herrera de la Fuente, Eduardo Mata, Francisco Savín, Helmut Calgeer, among others.

As a pianist she kept a special attention of Mexican XIX and early XX century romanticism composers as Juventino Rosas and Ricardo Castro. From 1994 to 2000 she performed and recorded the complete piano works of Rosas. Stankovich was part of the group of soloists of the National Institute of Fine Arts of Mexico. As a teacher she trained several generations of pianists and musicians.

== Awards and recognitions ==
- Águila de Tlatelolco given of the Secretariat of Foreign Affairs of Mexico, 1978
