= José Mercado (footballer) =

Mexican footballer (1928–2017)

Personal information
- Full name: José Mercado Luna
- Date of birth: 6 August 1928
- Place of birth: Atemajac de Brizuela, Mexico
- Date of death: 18 May 2017 (aged 88)
- Place of death: Guadalajara, Jalisco

International career
Years	Team	Apps	(Gls)
1948	Mexico	1	(0)

José Mercado Luna (6 August 1928 – 18 May 2017) was a Mexican footballer. He competed in the men's tournament at the 1948 Summer Olympics.
