= Miguel Ángel Granados Chapa =

Mexican journalist

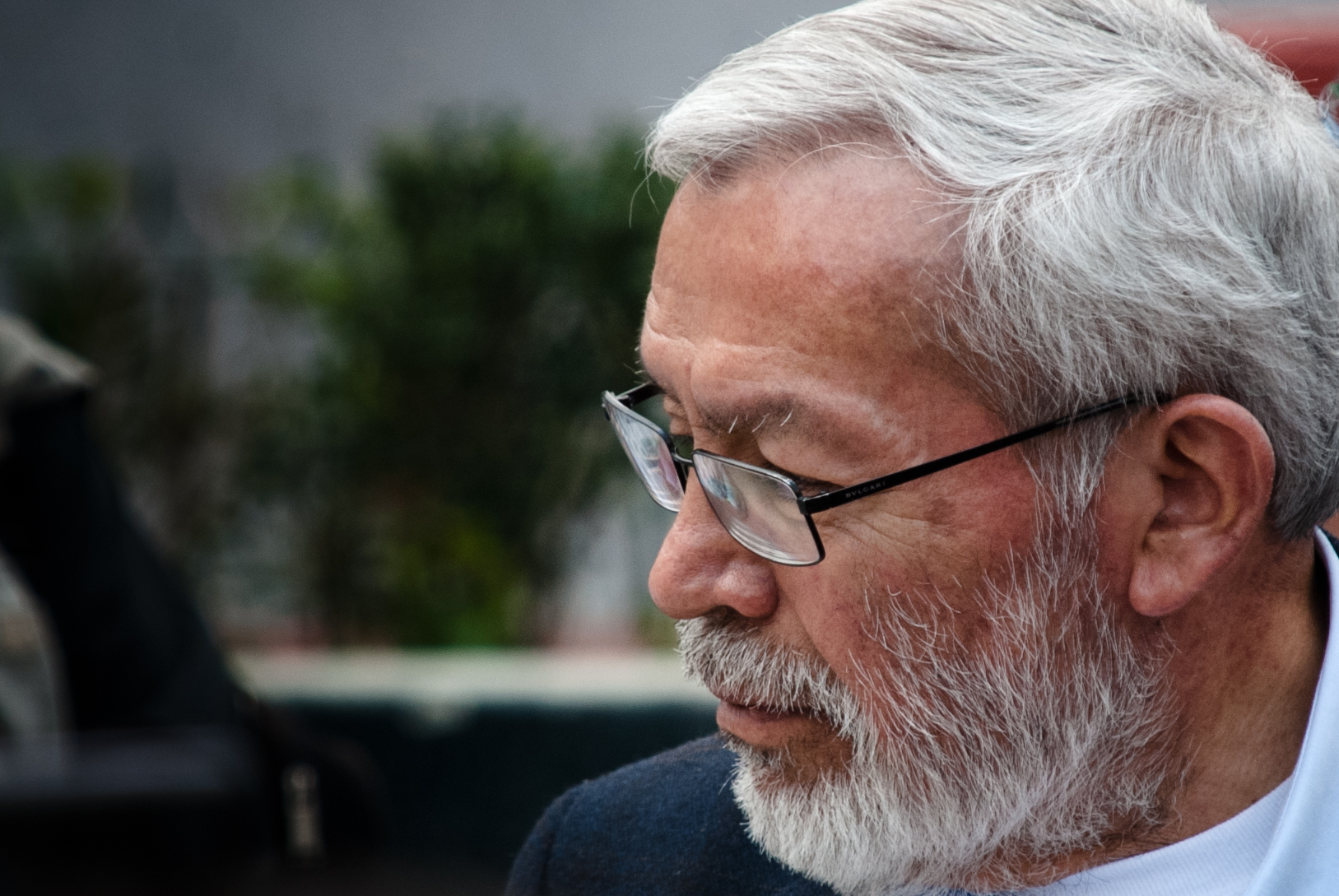
- Born: March 10, 1941; Mineral del Monte, Hidalgo, Mexico
- Died: October 16, 2011 (aged 70); Mexico City, Mexico
- Education: UNAM, Universidad Iberoamericana
- Occupation: journalist
- Known for: Reforma newspaper

Miguel Ángel Granados Chapa (March 10, 1941 – October 16, 2011) was a Mexican journalist writing for the Reforma newspaper. He was the recipient of the Premio Nacional de Periodismo in 2004 for his career, and again in 2006 for his column. He won the Pedro María Anaya medal in 2008 (an award given by the congress of Hidalgo), and the Belisario Domínguez Medal of Honor in 2008.

== Biography ==
Born in Mineral del Monte, Hidalgo, on March 10, 1941, he studied both law and journalism in the UNAM, and obtained a doctorate in History at the Universidad Iberoamericana.

He worked as editorial assistant director for Excélsior, director for Proceso, director for La Jornada, councilman for the Federal Electoral Institute (IFE), and ran for governor of Hidalgo in 1999.

He was the author of several books and had a column in the Reforma newspaper called "Plaza Pública", and a radio show with the same name on Radio UNAM.

== Death ==
In his last contribution to Reforma's "Plaza Pública", Granados Chapa said goodbye to his readers with the statement: "This is the last time we meet. With this conviction, I say goodbye". He died in Mexico City on October 16, 2011.
