= Alextime =

Russian YouTube-personality (born 1974)

- Aleksei Makeev in 2017
- Born: Aleksei Viktorovich Makeev; 22 August 1974 (age 52); Soviet Union
- Other name: "Lord Nazi Ruso"
- Citizenship: Russian
- Occupations: YouTube-personality, blogger, businessman and broker (formerly), diving instructor
- Years active: 2012–2017 (19 May)
- Notable work: Aquaworld (2003–2010)
- Movement: Neo-Nazism
- Parents: Viktor Yakovlevich Makeev (25 October 1930 — 27 August 2014) (father); Emma Nikolaevna Makeeva (7 June 1932 — 30 December 2022) (mother)
- Criminal information
- Conviction: Homicide
- Penalty: 37 years and 6 months in prison

Aleksei Viktorovich Makeev (Russian: Алексей Викторович Макеев; born 22 August 1974), also known by his aliases "Alextime" and "Lord Nazi Ruso", is a Russian former YouTube-personality and convicted murderer.

He gained notoriety for publishing videos containing overtly racist and violent behaviour, and later became the subject of a widely publicised mob attack in Mexico, during which he fatally stabbed one of his assailants. Makeev was found guilty of homicide and sentenced to 37 years and 6 months' imprisonment.

== Biography ==
Aleksei Viktorovich Makeev was born in 1974 in Elektrostal, Moscow Oblast, then part of the Russian Soviet Federative Socialist Republic.

In the early 2000s, he was subjected to administrative sanctions for minor acts of hooliganism and subsequently committed to compulsory psychiatric treatment, from which he was discharged after one month.

From approximately 2013, Makeev began to exhibit increasingly erratic and aggressive public behaviour. He frequently filmed himself verbally abusing and physically assaulting random passers-by in Elektrostal, pretending that they were blocking his way, later uploading the footage to the internet. He appeared in Russian media on several occasions – most notably in 2013, when he was characterised as a "flamboyant intellectual" and a "diving instructor with a high IQ" who had attacked women and children in his hometown. In one widely circulated video, he was seen approaching an elderly woman from behind and pushing her to the ground in a park. His online presence attracted limited attention within certain fringe online communities.

According to 5TV, Makeev had engaged in business and worked as a broker in Russia. He claimed to have been employed as a diving instructor in Egypt and Spain, from both of which he was reportedly deported.

Makeev claimed that he was a target of persecution and conspiracy by his neighbours and local residents.

=== Activities in Mexico ===
In April 2014, following increasing public hostility and multiple complaints to the authorities, Makeev relocated to Mexico. He rented a room in a poor district of Cancún, where he reportedly slept on the floor and worked as a salesman and security guard. Makeev was also employed for a time by the Cancún-based tour company Aquaworld, which later reported that his employment had been terminated in November 2015 owing to aggressive behaviour.

There, he continued to display antisocial and racist behaviour similar to that exhibited in Russia. He resumed publishing videos in which he insulted and provoked local residents, often shouting obscenities in Russian, English, and Spanish. Characterised by a dishevelled appearance and confrontational demeanour, he frequently filmed himself accosting pedestrians, including women and children, or shouting abuse from his balcony at neighbours. Among viewers of his YouTube channel, phrases such as "Fucking mierdas!", "Morir, mierda, morir!" and "Piece of shit!" became emblematic of his online persona, repeated and circulated by followers who treated his behaviour as a form of grotesque entertainment.

Owing to his frequent use of Nazi symbols, including swastikas, Mexican residents began referring to him as "Lord Nazi Ruso" ("Lord Nazi Russian").

==== 2017 Cancún incident ====
On 19 May 2017, a crowd of local residents assembled outside Makeev’s rented apartment in Cancún, Quintana Roo, to protest against his racist videos and behaviour. According to Quequi, approximately 400 individuals, armed with sticks, stones, and machetes, were present at the residence rented by Makeev during the attempted lynching. The gathering escalated into violence: the mob threw stones at the building and forced entry into the residence. Police officers arrived but were unable to quell the disturbance; they had reportedly patrolled the area earlier that evening, warning residents that neither civilians nor officers were permitted to enter the home of a foreign national, before subsequently departing.

During the ensuing confrontation, Makeev was severely beaten. In the course of the attack, he stabbed one of the assailants, 19-year-old Carlos N., who later died of his injuries en route to hospital. The police subsequently returned and dispersed the mob. During the incident, Makeev sustained a traumatic brain injury but was rescued by police and transported to hospital, where he was reported to be in a stable condition.

==== Trial and conviction ====
Makeev was subsequently charged with murder by the Quintana Roo state authorities. The prosecution argued that he had intentionally inflicted multiple stab wounds upon the victim, taking advantage of his position during the altercation. His defence maintained that the killing had occurred in self-defence.

In May 2019, Alexey Makeev addressed a video appeal to Russian Foreign Minister Sergey Lavrov, complaining about the conditions of his imprisonment in Mexico and alleging violations of his rights, including denial of medical care, physical and sexual abuse, denial of food and water. In the same video, Makeev claimed that, during a meeting with his lawyers and a prosecutor, he had been offered a plea deal: if he pleaded guilty, he would receive a sentence of 4.5 years, whereas if he continued to maintain his innocence, he would face sentence of more than 25 years in prison. In July 2019, following expert forensic examination and judicial review, Makeev was found guilty of homicide and sentenced to 37 years and 6 months imprisonment. Despite appeals in Russia that cited his psychiatric history, the conviction was upheld. The Office of the Attorney General of Quintana Roo also announced that Makeev was ordered to pay 405,002.40 Mexican pesos in compensation. The Embassy of the Russian Federation in Mexico stated that he is legally entitled to request a transfer to serve his sentence in Russia, "however, he has not yet submitted such a request."

=== Imprisonment ===
Following formal charges of aggravated homicide, he was taken into custody and transferred to the Centro de Readaptación Social (CERESO) prison in Chetumal, southern Quintana Roo.

Aleksei Makeev. Documentation and commentary on the closed prison system:

23.01.2023 — Prisoners in Zone A-2, where I was placed on 17.06.2022.

Structure: cell number, serial number, prison number, name, description.

1st cell: 0 — nobody.

2nd cell:

1 — 1624 — Daniel — looks like a Pole and like Bernard Werber (a); stole my paintings.
2 — 1732 — Yoda — a painter; attended art classes; likes to paint Indians; stole my paintings.

3rd cell:

3 — 3611 — Sur — Jewish, <…>; tattoo 'SUR' on the back of his head, indicating membership in the gangster-terrorist group Sur 13 Commandos — Sureños.
4 — 2367 — arrived on 09.09.2022; as soon as he arrived, he immediately started to shit on me.

4th cell: 0 — nobody.

5th cell:

5 — 1832 — the name he is registered under in the prison computer system: Cortez Velázquez González Octavio Gomez (provisional) — looks like Bernard (a) Werber (a); an American from Los Angeles (a); an FBI agent; he was the only one who called the American consulate. Professionally, in the American way — as they teach at the FBI — he tried to get into my arse. Complaint no. 35 was filed against him, dated 4 November 2022.

6th cell:

6 — 1889 — the name he is registered under in the prison computer system: Rubén A. Aguelar Sánchez — on my very first day, he gave me a notebook with a woman in a bikini cut out of a magazine and glued to the cover. This bikini-clad woman from the cover was personally snatched by the director of Prison no. 17 "CPS Michoacán". He wrote down the addresses of all the Mexican prisons in the notebook, planning to send me to another prison, since Cefereso no. 17 "CPS Michoacán" had already been completely overrun by Mexicans and Americans.

<…>

7 — 1696 — Chui — concealed his name <…>; has a tattoo on the outside of his right biceps: a skull wearing a Russian national kokoshnik. Rubén's direct supervisor, A. Aguelar Sánchez, planned — against the backdrop of Rubén's shit-filled background — to get into my arse, steal information and money, and kill me and my friends. Chui and Rubén are KGB–FSB agents. I told them they were faggots and promised to give them lipstick and perfume.

== In popular culture ==
Aleksei Makeev is the subject of the song "Lord Nazi Ruso", performed by the American death metal band Brujeria and included on the album Esto Es Brujería.
