= Sergio Aguayo =

Mexican academic & human rights activist (b.1947)

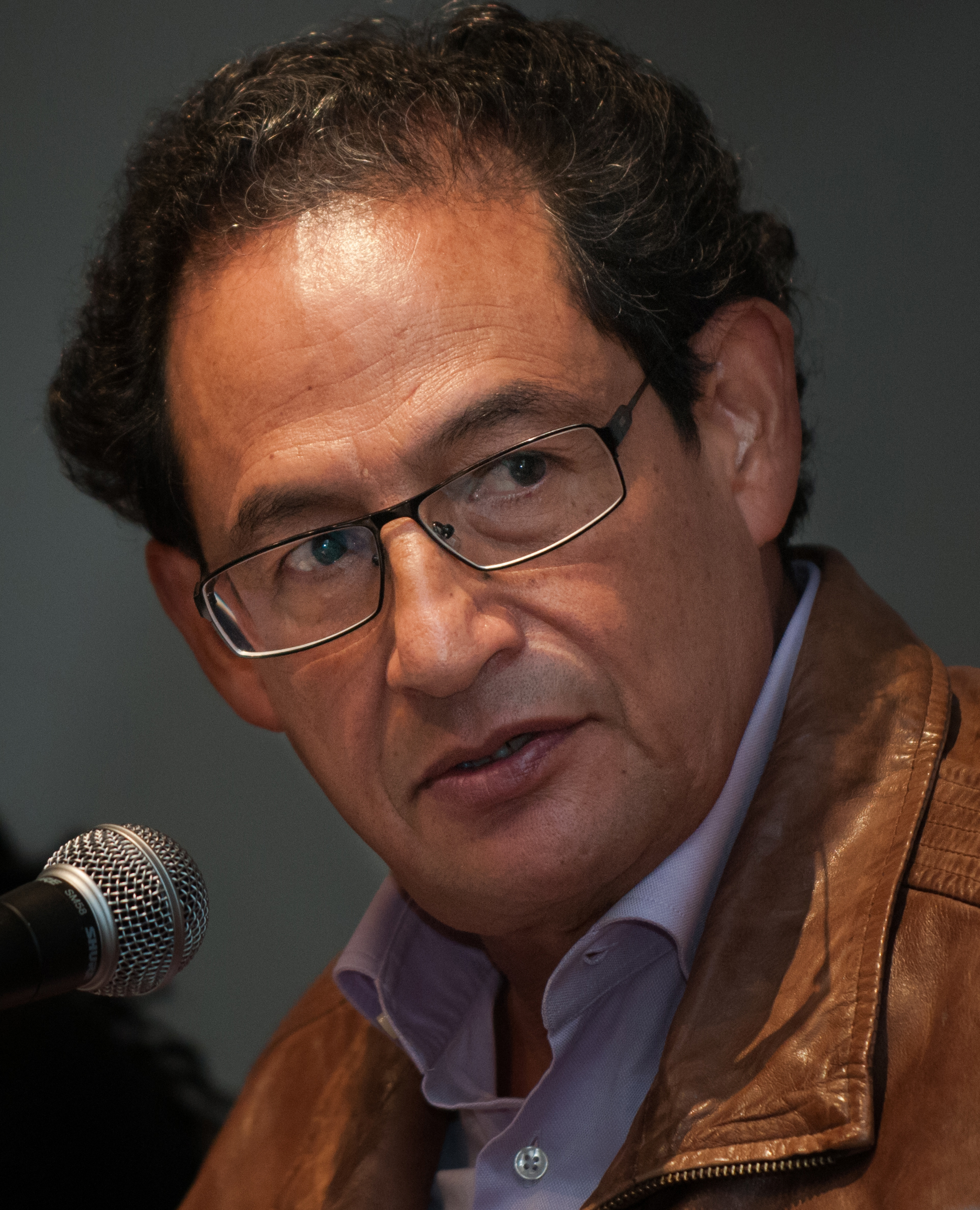
Sergio Aguayo in 2012

Sergio Aguayo Quezada (born September 10, 1947 in La Ribera, Jalisco, Mexico) is a Mexican academic and human rights activist. He has been a professor and researcher for El Colegio de México since 1977, visiting professor at Harvard University since 2015 and a member of the Mexican Researchers National System (Sistema Nacional de Investigadores.)

== Biography ==
Sergio Aguayo is a Researcher at Colegio de México and has taught at the Centro de Investigación y Docencia Económicas (CIDE), the Universidad Nacional Autónoma de México (UNAM) and been a guest teacher at various national and international universities.

He was a founding member of the newspaper La Jornada and the magazine Este País. He is a columnist for Reforma and other Mexican newspapers, and participates as an analyst on the television show Primer Plano, a political analysis show broadcast on the Instituto Politécnico Nacional's XEIPN (Channel 11), for which he received the José Pagés Llergo Journalism Prize. Additionally, he is a guest columnist for the Spanish newspaper El País. Until 2015, he was also commentator at the Mesa Política (Political Table) of the radio broadcasting of Noticias MVS with Carmen Aristegui.

Sergio Aguayo received his BA in International Relations at El Colegio de México. He obtained his Masters, PhD and postgraduate studies at the Johns Hopkins University Paul H. Nitze School of Advanced International Studies (SAIS).

From 1990 to 1996 he was President of the Academia Mexicana de Derechos Humanos (Mexican Academy of Human Rights), and from 1994 to 1999 he was a member of the National Coordination of Alianza Cívica. He presided the Alianza Cívica, Asociación Política Nacional and Propuesta Cívica (Civic Alliance, National Political Alliance Civic Proposal). Dr. Aguayo was also President of the board of directors of Fundar, Centro de Análisis e Investigación.

== Publications ==
- "The Mexican Enigma. The Mexico of Organized Society, de facto Powers and Enrique Peña Nieto", Ink, 2010.
- Vuelta en U. Guía para reactivar la democracia estancada, (U-turn. Guide to reactive the stagnated democracy), Taurus, 2010
- La transición en México. Una historia documental 1910–2010 (Transition in Mexico. A Documentary History 1910–2010), Colegio de México y Fondo de Cultura Económica, 2010
- The Mexican Alamanac, 2008
- Mexico-United States Almanac, 2005
- Diagnosis on the Situation of Human Rights in Mexico, 2003
- The "Charola": A history of intelligence services in Mexico, 2001
- The Mexican Almanac, 2000
- The Cemetery of Myths: the United States and Mexican Nationalism, 1998
- 1968: The Archives of Violence, 1998
