= Rosaura Barahona =

Mexican writer, journalist and educator

Rosaura Barahona Aguayo (October 12, 1942 – October 21, 2017) was a Mexican writer, journalist and educator who had a regular column in the El Norte newspaper of Monterrey dealing with social issues.

== Life ==
Barahona was born on October 12, 1942, in Mexico City, the daughter of Arturo Barahona Gonzalez and Gudelia Aguayo. She earned her bachelor's degree in language and modern literature at Monterrey Tech, and studied scriptwriting at the Escuela Oficial de Cine in Madrid. She was married to academic and critic Roberto Escamilla, with whom she had three children, Roberta, Corina and José Roberto. She was hospitalized with a pulmonary infection and scheduled for surgery at Doctors Hospital in Monterrey. However, days later she died after a call for A+ blood on her behalf.

== Writing career ==
Barahona wrote a large quantity of articles for various magazines and newspapers but was best known for her work with newspapers La Prensa in Honduras and with El Norte in Monterrey. For the latter, she was an editorialist from 1993 until her death, writing about social problems, corruption and sexual violence. Most of her writing denounced injustice of one sort or another. She was a feminist with themes along these lines appearing in her fiction. Her writing style as a journalist showed her training as an educator.

== Professor ==
Barahona was a professor for 29 years teaching at the Monterrey Institute of Technology and Higher Studies, serving as the director of the department of Humanities and Spanish Letters at Monterrey Tec from 1999. She also spoke regularly at conferences and was a consultant and trainer with the Organización de Bachillerato Internacional for Lati America.

== Selected works ==
- Barahona, Rosaura and Fabricio Vanden Broeck. El pescador de estrellas Fernández: Mexico (1984) (in Spanish)
- Barahona Aguayo, Rosaura. ¿Por qué no Ferlos o Cardo? Editorial Oasis: Mexico (1984) (in Spanish)
- Barahona Aguayo, Rosaura. Abecedario para niñas solitarias. Ediciones Castillo: Monterrey, Mexico (1994) (in Spanish)
- Barahona Aguayo, Rosaura; Héctor Jaime Treviño Villarreal; and Hugo Valdés Manríquez. --Y ellos hicieron la historia: las familias regiomontanas Patronato Monterrey 400—Ediciones Castillo: Monterrey, Mexico (1996) (in Spanish)
- Barahona Aguayo, Rosaura. "El varón visto desde los ojos de la mujer". Cuadernos de espiritualidad ignaciana No. 171 (Sept.-Oct. 2008), p. 36-40 (in Spanish)
- Barahona Aguayo, Rosaura.Pupilas de espejo y otros textos. Universidad Autónoma de Nuevo León—Fondo Editorial de Nuevo León: Monterrey, Mexico (2012) (in Spanish)

She also adapted Eva sin Paraíso and El destierro for the theater.
