= Tony Flores =

Canadian para-athlete and advocate

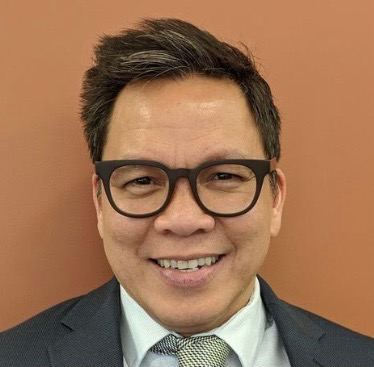
- Flores in 2018

Personal information
- Nationality: Canadian, Filipino
- Born: Philippines

Sport
- Country: Canada
- Sport: Paracanoe

Tony Flores is a Filipino Canadian paracanoe athlete who lives in Edmonton, Alberta. He served as the first appointed advocate at the Office of the Advocate for Persons with Disabilities with the Government of Alberta.

== Para-athletics ==
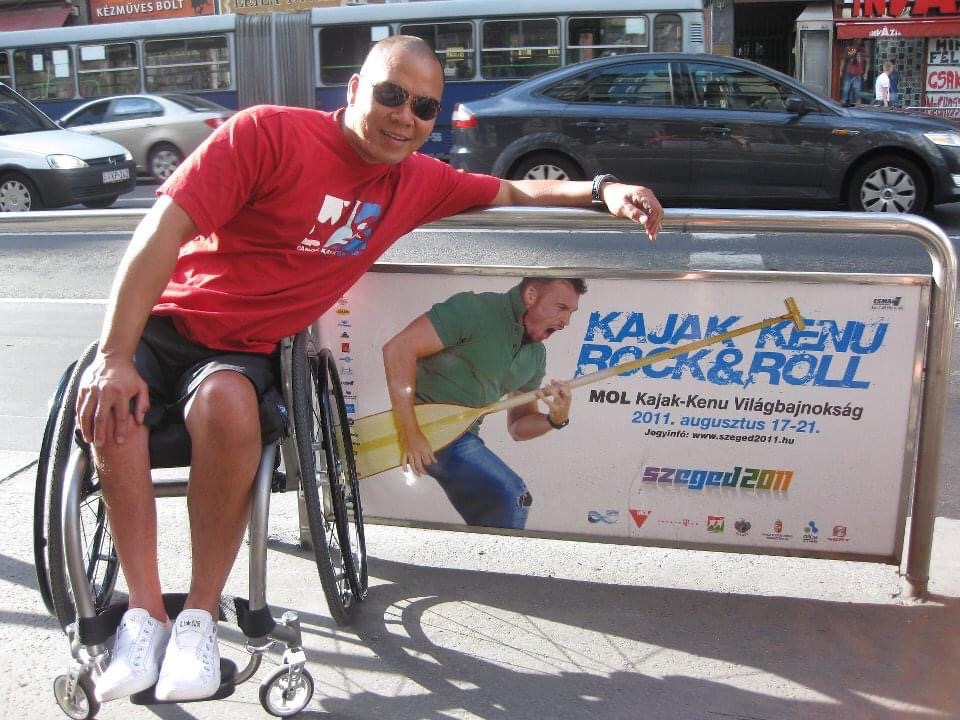
Tony Flores at the 2011 ICF Canoe Sprint World Championships

As a para-athlete, Flores has competed internationally, including as a member of Canada's paracanoe team at the 2009 ICF Canoe Sprint World Championships in Canada, which was the premiere of paracanoe in sport competition. Flores also competed in paracanoe at the 2010 event in Poland and in 2011 in Hungary. He has also competed in wheelchair racing and para-Nordic skiing.

Flores has served as the director of the Whang Youn Dai Achievement Award for eight Paralympic Games. Additionally, he has served on the board of directors of the nonprofit Alberta Sport Connection, from 2016 to 2018.

== Advocacy ==
On October 30, 2018, Flores was appointed as the first Advocate for Persons with Disabilities, with the opening of the Office of the Advocate for Persons with Disabilities within the Government of Alberta. His three-year term ended on October 31, 2021.

Flores is the inspiration for the children's book Tony's Wheels, by Mila Bongco-Philipzig.
