= Ramiro Alejandro Celis =

Mexican bullfighter (1992–2017)

- Born: May 23, 1992; Dzununcán, Mexico
- Died: June 30, 2017 (aged 25); Mérida, Mexico
- Occupation: Bullfighter (Torero)
- Years active: 2005-2017

Ramiro Alejandro Celis, known by El Niño de Dzununcán, (Dzununcán, May 23, 1992 - Mérida, June 30, 2017) was a Mexican bullfighter.

Ramiro Alejandro Celis died as a result of a goring while participating in a bullfighting festival in the town of Dzibikak (Yucatán).

He died of a goring on June 30, 2017. The goring penetrated the back and affected the lungs and ribs. He was operated on at the Agustín O'Horan General Hospital in Yucatán, and died shortly thereafter. He was buried in the town of Dzununcán.

== See also ==
- List of bullfighters
