= Denise Dresser =

Mexican political scientist, journalist, writer, and university professor

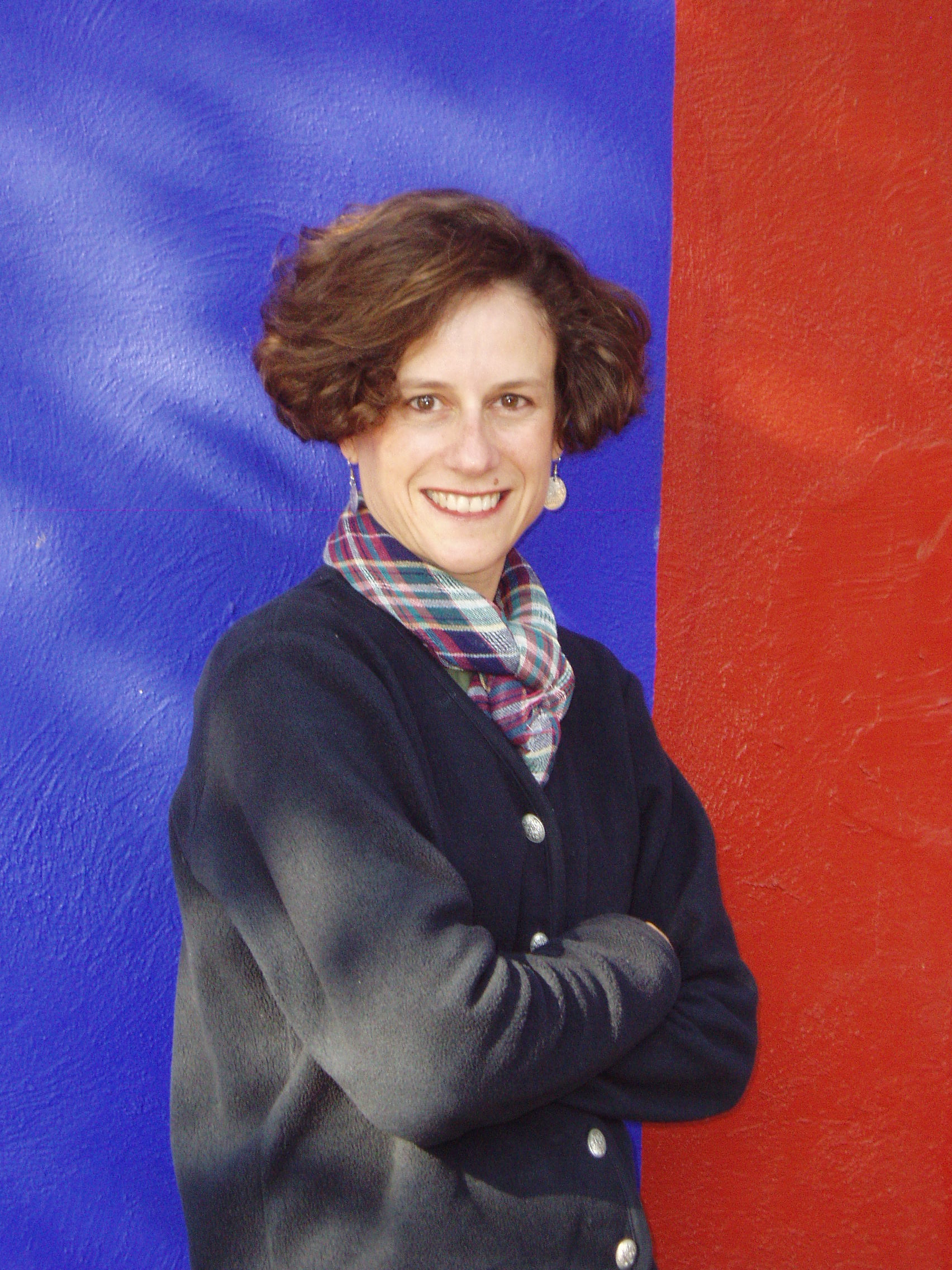
- Denise Dresser in 2020
- Born: Denise Eugenia Dresser Guerra; 22 January 1963 (age 63); Mexico City, Mexico
- Occupations: Political scientist, writer, journalist, professor
- Years active: 1980s–present
- Known for: Political commentary, advocacy for democracy and human rights
- Awards: Legion of Honour (Knight); National Journalism Award

Academic background
- Education: El Colegio de México; Princeton University

Academic work
- Institutions: Instituto Tecnológico Autónomo de México (ITAM)
- Notable works: El país de uno (2011); México: Lo que todo ciudadano quisiera (no) saber de su patria (2004)

Denise Eugenia Dresser Guerra (born 22 January 1963) is a Mexican political scientist, writer, journalist, and university professor. She is currently a faculty member of the Department of Political Science at the Instituto Tecnológico Autónomo de México (ITAM), a columnist for Proceso magazine, an editorial writer for the newspaper Reforma, and a regular participant in the television program La Hora de Opinar. Dresser is known for her critical analysis of Mexican politics and opposition to Morena, her advocacy for liberal democracy, and her influential presence on social media.

== Early life and education ==
Denise Dresser was born in Mexico City, Mexico, on 22 January 1963. She is the granddaughter of Ivan Dresser, an American track and field athlete and former managing director of General Motors in Mexico. Dresser completed her undergraduate studies at El Colegio de México, where she developed a strong foundation in political science and international relations. She later earned a Ph.D. in Political Science from Princeton University.

== Career ==
=== Academic work ===
Dresser is a professor in the Department of Political Science at the Instituto Tecnológico Autónomo de México (ITAM), where she teaches courses on Mexican politics, comparative politics, and public policy. Her academic work focuses on issues of governance, corruption, and inequality in Mexico.

=== Journalism and commentary ===
Dresser is a prominent columnist for Proceso, a leading Mexican news magazine, and an editorial writer for Reforma, one of Mexico's most influential newspapers. She has also published in international outlets such as La Opinión in Los Angeles, Los Angeles Times, and The New York Times.

Dresser has been a commentator and host on several television and radio programs, including:

- Detrás de la noticia – A news program where she provided analysis and commentary.
- Entre versiones – A program she hosted on Channel 40.
- El cristal con que se mira – A show hosted by Víctor Trujillo where she participated as a guest.
- Politics table on Radio Monitor with Jose Gutierrez Vivo – A radio program where she analyzed political developments.
- W Radio – She was a weekly commentator on W Radio.
- Politics table with Carmen Aristegui – She participated in this program until 2015.
- El país de uno – A television program she anchored on CONACULTA Channel 22.

Dresser's columns tend to critique government policies put forth by the left-wing Morena party, oppose monopolies, and advocate for demilitarization.

=== Activism ===
Dresser has participated in civil society movements such as Seguridad sin Guerra and Fiscalía que sirva.

Dresser has also been an outspoken critic of monopolistic practices in Mexico. She has opposed the so-called Televisa Law, which she argues favors the television duopoly of Televisa and TV Azteca. She has also criticized Carlos Slim, the Mexican billionaire who owns much of the country's telephone network (TELMEX), for his dominance in the telecommunications sector.

=== Social media influence ===
Dresser is an active user of Twitter, where she shares her views on politics, society, and current events. In 2013, she was named one of the 50 most influential women on Twitter by Forbes magazine.

== Notable works ==
Dresser is the author of several books on Mexican politics and society, including:

- El país de uno (2011) – A critique of Mexico's political and social systems.
- México: Lo que todo ciudadano quisiera (no) saber de su patria (2004) – An analysis of Mexico's challenges and opportunities, co-authored with novelist Jorge Volpi.
- Our country: reflections to understand and change Mexico – A book proposing ten points to transform Mexico.

She has also coordinated and contributed to the following works:

- Cries and Whispers: Untimely experiences of 38 women – A book she coordinated and later adapted into a television series.
- Cries and Whispers II: Untimely experiences of 39 other women – A follow-up to the first volume.

== Personal life ==
Denise Dresser is the mother of three children.

== Controversy ==
In March and April 2025, Dresser faced criticism for a comment made during a segment on LatinUS, where she suggested that "the best thing that could happen is for [President Claudia Sheinbaum's] soul to detach and remain trapped in one of those graves," referring to mass graves associated with cartel violence in Mexico. Commentators variously described the remark as threatening, misogynistic, or disrespectful to the victims of cartel violence, while Dresser defended the remarks as political critique.

== Awards and honors ==
- Legion of Honour (Knight) – Awarded by the French government for her defense of freedom of expression and human rights.
- National Journalism Award – Recognized for her contributions to journalism.
