= El Norte (Monterrey) =

Newspaper

- Type: Daily newspaper
- Format: Broadsheet
- Owner: Grupo Reforma
- Publisher: Ignacio Mijares
- Editor: Lázaro Ríos
- Founded: September 15, 1938; 88 years ago
- Headquarters: Washington 629 Ote. Monterrey, NL. 64000
- Circulation: 232,432 daily
- OCLC number: 891090015
- Website: www.elnorte.com

El Norte is a Mexican daily newspaper based in Monterrey, Nuevo León.

== History ==
During the decades of the 1970s, 1980s, and 1990s, El Norte gained important successes in exposing corruption in government. In retaliation, the federal government cut the paper supply required to print the newspaper, so the company had to import it directly. In the end, El Norte won the battle against what was then a government monopoly on the import of paper for printing (PIPSA). Grupo Reforma is 85 years old. It began with the founding of the newspaper El Sol in April 1922, followed by El Norte in 1938, the newspaper Metro in Monterrey in 1988 (and renovated in 1993). Four years later, in 1997, the newspaper Palabra was born in Saltillo, and the Metro in Mexico City. Mural, in Guadalajara, was founded a year later. In 2004 and 2005, Metro expanded to Saltillo and Guadalajara. In 2007 and 2008, Metro again expanded to the State of Mexico and Puebla. La Reforma, a branch of El Norte, was founded in 1993 in Mexico City.

=== 2012 attacks ===
On 10 July 2012, gunmen threw grenades into two buildings belonging to the paper. On 30 July, the El Norte headquarters in Monterrey was attacked by three masked men who subdued the security guard and set fire to the building's lobby. Two carried automatic weapons. A police car arrived on the scene, but did not attempt to apprehend the suspects. The attack was the third in one month against the newspaper, leading to speculation that the attack was retaliation by drug traffickers for El Norte's coverage of organized crime.

== Notable columnists ==
- Armando Fuentes Aguirre (Catón), writer and political analyst
- Carmen Aristegui, a political journalist
- Rosaura Barahona, teacher, essayist
- Carlos Fuentes, writer, essayist
- Carlos Monsiváis, writer, essayist, journalist
- Denise Dresser, a political analyst
- Enrique Krauze, historian
- Everardo Elizondo, an economist
- Gabriel Zaid, writer, poet, engineer
- Germain Dehesa, writer and political commentator
- Homero Aridjis, poet, environmentalist
- Jorge Castañeda, intellectual, academic, former Foreign Secretary
- José Woldenberg, political analyst, former President of IFE
- John Villoro, writer
- Lorenzo Meyer, historian and political analyst
- Miguel Ángel Granados Chapa, intellectual, political analyst
- Mario Vargas Llosa, writer, essayist
- Paco Calderón, political cartoonist
- Sergio Aguayo Quezada, a political analyst
- Alan Rivera, journalist, political analyst, news producer, TV talent
- Lucrecia Lozano, political analyst, academic
- Roberto Javier Mora García, assassinated crime reporter

== Regular sections ==
- Internacional (International News)
- Nacional (National News)
- Local (Local News)
- Seguridad (Public Safety and Criminal News)
- Negocios (Business News)
- Gente (Entertainment News)
- Vida! (Miscellaneous News)
- Mexico City (online version)

=== Supplemental sections ===
- Automotriz (Automobile News)
- Interface (Electronics and Gadgets News)
- De Viaje (Traveling News)
- Top Magazzine (Entertainment and Gossip News)
- Universidades (College Information News)

=== Social supplements ===
These supplements are only given to subscribers who live in that neighborhood or attend the area's school. e.g., The Anahuac section is only sold to subscribers living in the Colonia Anahuac neighborhood.

- Sierra Madre
- SM Joven
- SM JR
- La Silla
- Cumbres
- Cumbres Joven
- Anáhuac
- Linda Vista
- Fototienda
- ClubTEC
- ClubUNI

== See also ==
- List of newspapers in Mexico
