= Grupo Reforma =

Mexican print media company

- Industry: Newspapers
- Founded: 1922; 104 years ago
- Founder: Rodolfo Junco Voigth
- Headquarters: Washington 629 Ote. Monterrey, NL, MX
- Key people: Alejandro Junco de la Vega (President and CEO) Rodolfo Junco de la Vega (Chairman); Lázaro Ríos (Chairman)
- Products: Reforma; Mural; El Norte; El Sol; Metro
- Website: reforma.com

Grupo Reforma is the largest printed media company in Mexico and Latin America. It publishes ten daily newspapers in five cities, including the leading newspapers in Mexico's three largest cities: Reforma in Mexico City, El Norte in Monterrey and Mural in Guadalajara. It also publishes the daily Metro in Mexico City, Monterrey, Guadalajara, Puebla and Toluca, and the afternoon tabloid El Sol in Monterrey. The average daily circulation of all these papers is 1.4 million copies.

The group also owns the largest content-intensive web sites in Mexico: reforma.com, elnorte.com, and mural.com. It owns the largest newswire service with Mexican information, Agencia Reforma. It publishes city specific editions of Metro, a prominent tabloid in the country. Cancha, a tabloid with Mexican sports and entertainment news, is published biweekly in Las Vegas in partnership with The Las Vegas Review-Journal. Grupo Reforma also has strategic alliances with leading US dailies to publish their information in its papers, including a daily section of The Wall Street Journal and a weekly section of The New York Times.

== History ==
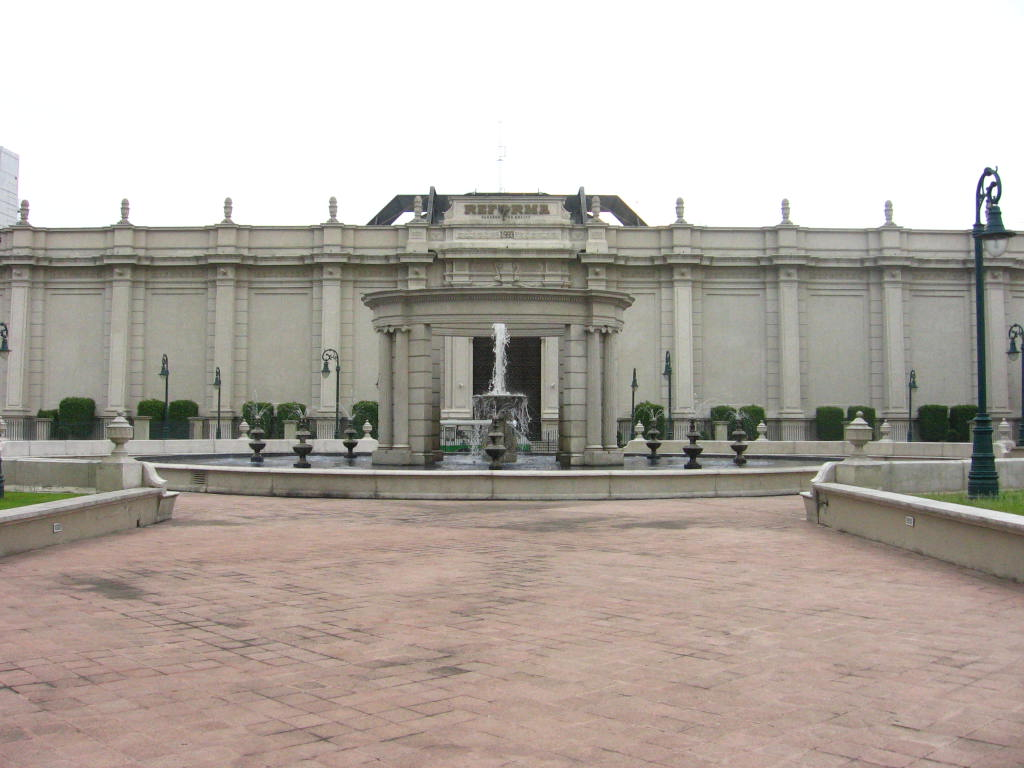
The Grupo Reforma headquarters in Mexico City

Grupo Reforma was created by Alejandro Junco de la Vega and Rodolfo Junco Jr. from the merger of two companies, Editora el Sol S.A. and Ediciones del Norte S.A. The newsgroup was started with the founding of El Sol in April 1922, followed by El Norte in 1938, Monterrey's Metro in 1988, Reforma in 1993, Palabra and Mexico City's Metro in 1997, Mural in 1998, Saltillo's Metro in 2004 and Guadalajara's Metro in 2005.

Reforma was an offshoot of El Norte, the noted Monterrey-based daily. Grupo Reforma was the first newsgroup in Mexico to separate its commercial division from its journalism division. This allows for a greater independence, and helps journalists resist the temptation of writing articles favorable to sponsors.

When it was founded on November 20, the newspaper pressured unionized newsstands to sell the paper that day. Since November 20 is the Día de la Revolución (Day of the Revolution), an obligatory public holiday in México, the unions refused, so Reforma was sold on the streets by journalists and celebrities as a protest against what they considered "a boycott". Reforma changed the traditional distribution of newspapers with its independence from the unionized newsstands and printed media resellers. It also was innovative because of the inclusion of people of all political opinions in its editorial pages.

Grupo Reforma's independent journalism drew the ire of the powerful Mexico City carrier union barely a year after it was born. This syndicate controls distribution of all newspapers in the capital city and was traditionally used by the political system to bring down any paper that was deemed unacceptable. The carrier union boycotted the distribution of Reforma in Mexico City in October 1994. Grupo Reforma decided to create an independent distribution channel to sell Reforma on the city streets. The support of the readers was incredible: intellectuals, artists and regular folks joined Reforma's personnel in the process of creating this channel. Dozens of people took to the streets to sell the paper, despite the verbal and even physical violence of the carrier union. Currently, Reforma is distributed independently to the homes of 85,000 subscribers, to supermarkets and other retail outlets and to readers in Mexico city's streets. The paper's daily circulation averages 200,000.

Grupo Reforma's dailies have an open journalism model that is very different from any newspaper in the world. One of the cornerstones of this model is the editorial board. Each section of every paper has an editorial board composed of readers and leaders in the section's area of interest who get together weekly or bi-monthly to set the section's editorial agenda. For example, the editorial board of Reforma's national section may include a diputado (member of house of representatives), a senator, several politicians, some members of non-governmental organizations, as well as regular readers. The boards have complete liberty of action in setting what is covered. The board is led by each section's editor, the person who is directly responsible for the daily operation of the section.

Each board session is divided in two parts. First, the board members critique the content published in the section since the last time they met. What was done right? What needs to be corrected? What was plainly wrong? These and other similar topics are covered. Second, the discussion centers on the work ahead. What stories should the section be working on? Who should the paper be interviewing? Are there any events that should be covered? It is in this part of the meeting that the editorial agenda is defined.

Each year, 850 people make up the 70 editorial boards that define the editorial agenda for all of Grupo Reforma's papers. More than eight thousand people have been members of an editorial board during the 15 years that they have been in operation. Participation is voluntary, so no payment is given. The boards are revamped each year, but a couple of members are chosen to stay on to deal with any unfinished work in progress. Every quarter, the editor gives his/her board a balance of all the suggestions they have provided and how they have been implemented in the section.

== Criticism ==
The journalism model of Grupo Reforma has drawn many attacks, both verbal and physical, from politicians and other powerful groups whose interests have been affected by the stories during its 85-year tenure.
