= Mexico–United States relations =

Bilateral relations between the United States of America and the United Mexican States

- Mexico: United States

Diplomatic mission
- Embassy of Mexico, Washington, D.C.: Embassy of the United States, Mexico City

Envoy
- Mexican Ambassador to the United States Roberto Lazzeri: American Ambassador to Mexico Ronald D. Johnson

Mexico and the United States have a strained history, with the American invasion in the 1840s and the subsequent American occupation and annexation of more than 50% of former Mexican territory, including Texas, Arizona, California, Nevada, Utah, parts of Colorado, parts of Oklahoma, parts of Kansas and New Mexico. Pressure from the American government was one of the factors that helped force the French invaders out in the 1860s. During the Mexican Revolution of the 1910s, the coup against mexican president Francisco I. Madero was heavily supported by the American government through the pact of the embassy. Other tensions resulted in the Cold War through the so-called Mexican Dirty War. The two nations share a maritime and land border. Several treaties have been concluded between the two nations bilaterally, such as the Gadsden Purchase, and multilaterally, such as the 2019 United States–Mexico–Canada Agreement, replacing the 1994 NAFTA. Both are members of various international organizations, including the Organization of American States and the United Nations. According to Adolfo Aguilar Zínser, Mexican diplomat and intellectual, the political and intellectual class of the United States sees Mexico as "a country whose position is that of a backyard".

Since the late nineteenth century, during the regime of President Porfirio Díaz (1876–1911), the two countries have had close diplomatic and economic ties. During Díaz's long presidency, U.S. businessmen acquired agricultural and mining interests in the country. The U.S. played an important role in the course of the Mexican Revolution (1910–20) with direct actions of the U.S. influencing the outcome. The long border between the two countries means that peace and security in that region are important to the U.S.'s national security and international trade. The U.S. and Mexico are each other’s largest trading partners as of 2023. In 2010, Mexico's exports totaled US$309.6 billion, and almost three quarters of those purchases were made by the United States. They are also closely connected demographically, with over one million U.S. citizens living in Mexico and Mexico being the largest source of immigrants to the United States, with about 8-10 million Mexican immigrants in the US.

While condemning the terrorist attacks of 9/11 and providing considerable relief aid to the U.S. after Hurricane Katrina, the Mexican government, pursuing neutrality in international affairs, opted not to actively join the war on terror and the Iraq War, instead being the first nation in history to formally and voluntarily leave the Inter-American Treaty of Reciprocal Assistance in 2002.

== Country comparison ==
	Mexico	United States of America
Coat of Arms		
Flag	Mexico	United States
Population	131,946,900	342,721,000
Area	1,972,550 km^{2} (761,610 mi^{2})	9,820,630 km^{2} (3,791,770 mi^{2})
Population Density	61/km^{2} (160/sq mi)	96.3/km^{2} (249/sq mi)
Capital	Mexico City	Washington, D.C.
Largest City	Mexico City – 9,209,944 (21,804,515 Metro)	New York City – 8,600,710 (19,006,798 Metro)
Government	Federal presidential constitutional republic	Federal presidential constitutional republic
First Leader	Agustín de Iturbide	George Washington
Current Leaders	Claudia Sheinbaum	Donald Trump
Official languages	Spanish	English (de facto, none at federal level)
GDP (nominal)	US$1.783 trillion	US$30.615 trillion

== History ==
The United States of America shares a unique and often complex relationship with the United Mexican States. With shared history stemming back to the Texas Revolution (1835–1836) and the Mexican–American War (1846–1848), several treaties have been concluded between the two nations, most notably the Gadsden Purchase, and multilaterally with Canada, the North American Free Trade Agreement (NAFTA). Mexico and the United States are members of various international organizations, such as the Organization of American States and the United Nations. Boundary disputes and allocation of boundary waters have been administered since 1889 by the International Boundary and Water Commission, which also maintains international dams and wastewater sanitation facilities. Once viewed as a model of international cooperation, in recent decades the IBWC has been heavily criticized as an institutional anachronism, bypassed by modern social, environmental, and political issues. Illegal immigration, arms sales, and drug smuggling continue to be contentious issues in 21st-century U.S.-Mexico relations.

=== Since 1945 ===
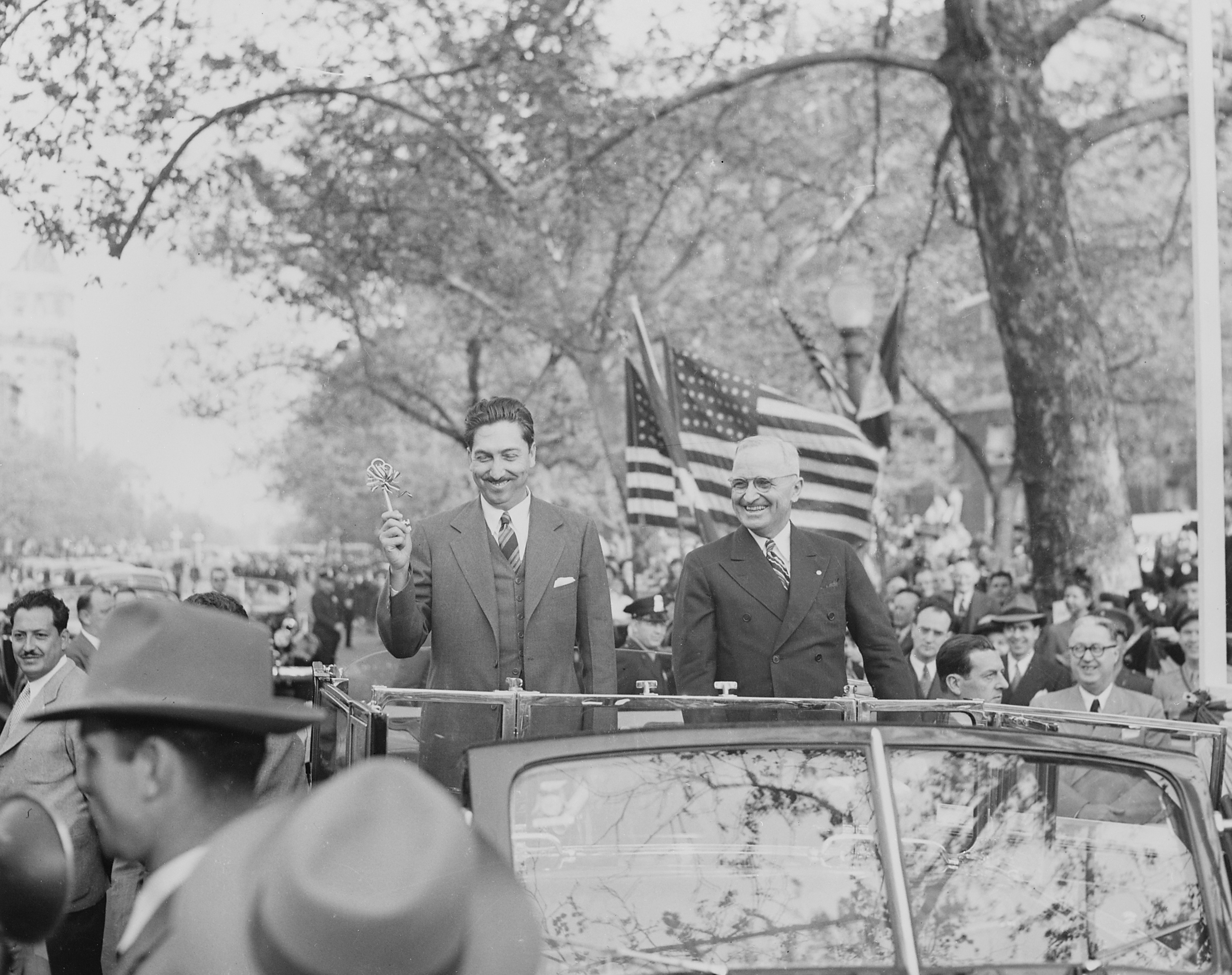
Miguel Alemán Valdés, president of Mexico (left) and Harry S. Truman, president of the United States (right) in Washington, D.C.

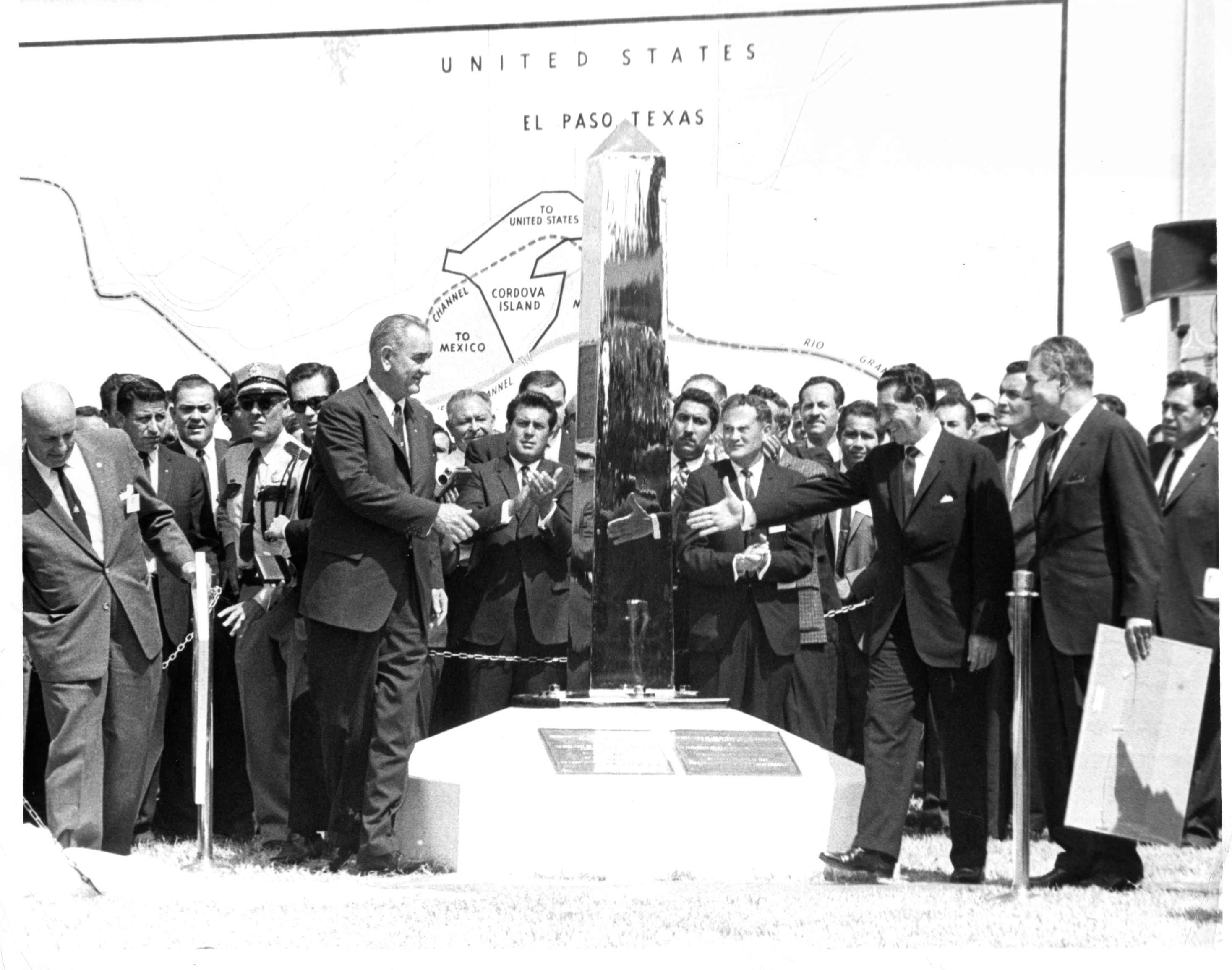
U.S. President Lyndon B. Johnson (left) and Mexican President Adolfo López Mateos (right) unveil the new boundary marker signaling the peaceful end of the Chamizal dispute

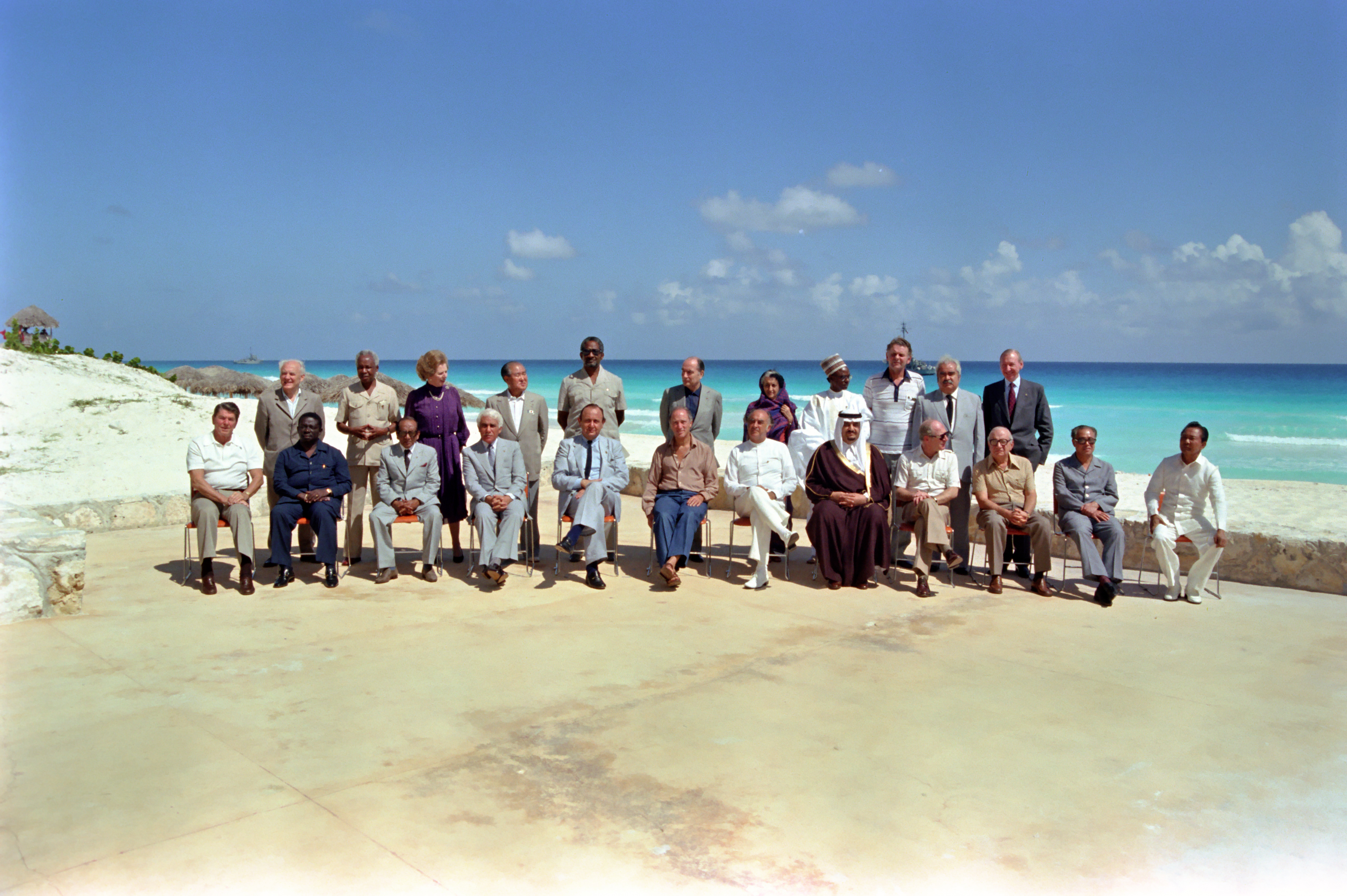
President Ronald Reagan attending the North–South Summit in Cancun along with his Mexican counterpart President José López Portillo, 1981

The alliance between Mexico and the U.S. during World War II brought the two countries into a far more harmonious relationship with one another. Mexican President Manuel Avila Camacho met in person with both Franklin D. Roosevelt and Harry S. Truman, helping to cement ties with the U.S. Avila Camacho was not a leader in the Mexican Revolution himself, and held opinions that were pro-business and pro-religious that were more congenial to the U.S. while he maintained revolutionary rhetoric. During Avila Camacho's visit with Truman near the centenary of the Mexican–American War, Truman returned some of the Mexican banners captured by the United States in the conflict and praised the military cadets who died defending Mexico City during the invasion.

For bilateral relations between the U.S. and Mexico, the end of World War II meant decreased U.S. demand for Mexican labor via the guest-worker Bracero Program and for Mexican raw materials to fuel a major war. For Mexican laborers and Mexican exporters, there were fewer economic opportunities. However, while at the same time, the government's coffers were full and aided post-war industrialization. In 1946, the dominant political party changed its name to the Institutional Revolutionary Party, and while maintaining revolutionary rhetoric, it in fact embarked on industrialization that straddled the line between nationalist and pro-business policies. Mexico supported U.S. policies in the Cold War and did not challenge U.S. intervention in Guatemala that ousted leftist president Jacobo Arbenz.

=== Boundary issues and the border region ===
Under Mexican president Adolfo López Mateos, the U.S. and Mexico concluded a treaty on January 14, 1964, to resolve the Chamizal dispute over the boundary between the two countries, with the U.S. ceding the disputed territory. The Boundary Treaty of 1970 resolved further issues between the two countries. Since then, jurisdictional issues regarding water rights in the Rio Grande Valley have continued to cause tension between farmers on both sides of the border, according to Mexican political scientist Armand Peschard-Sverdrup.

=== North American Free Trade Agreement (since 1994) ===
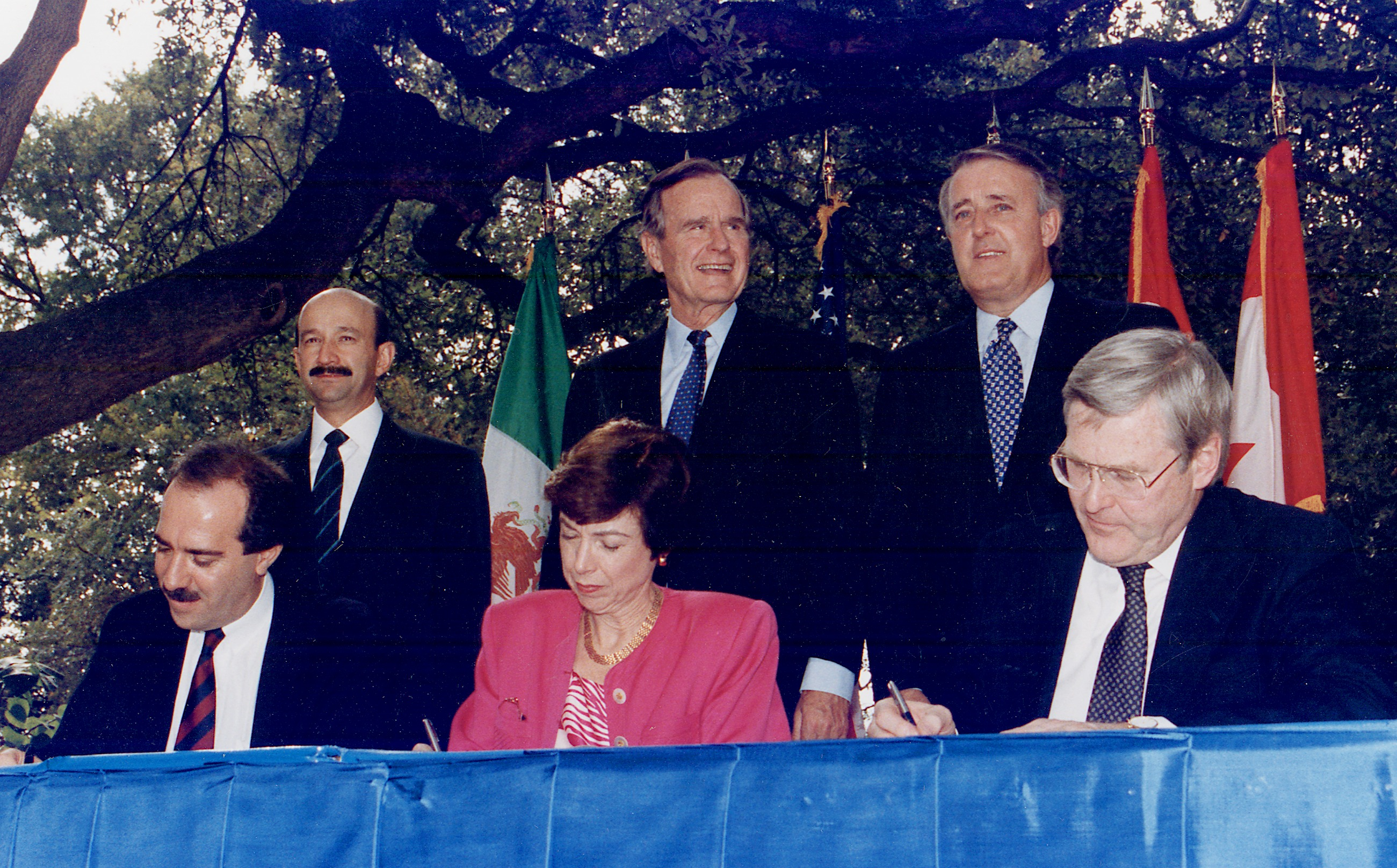
Carlos Salinas, President of Mexico (back left), George H. W. Bush, President of the United States (back centre), and Brian Mulroney, Prime Minister of Canada (back right)

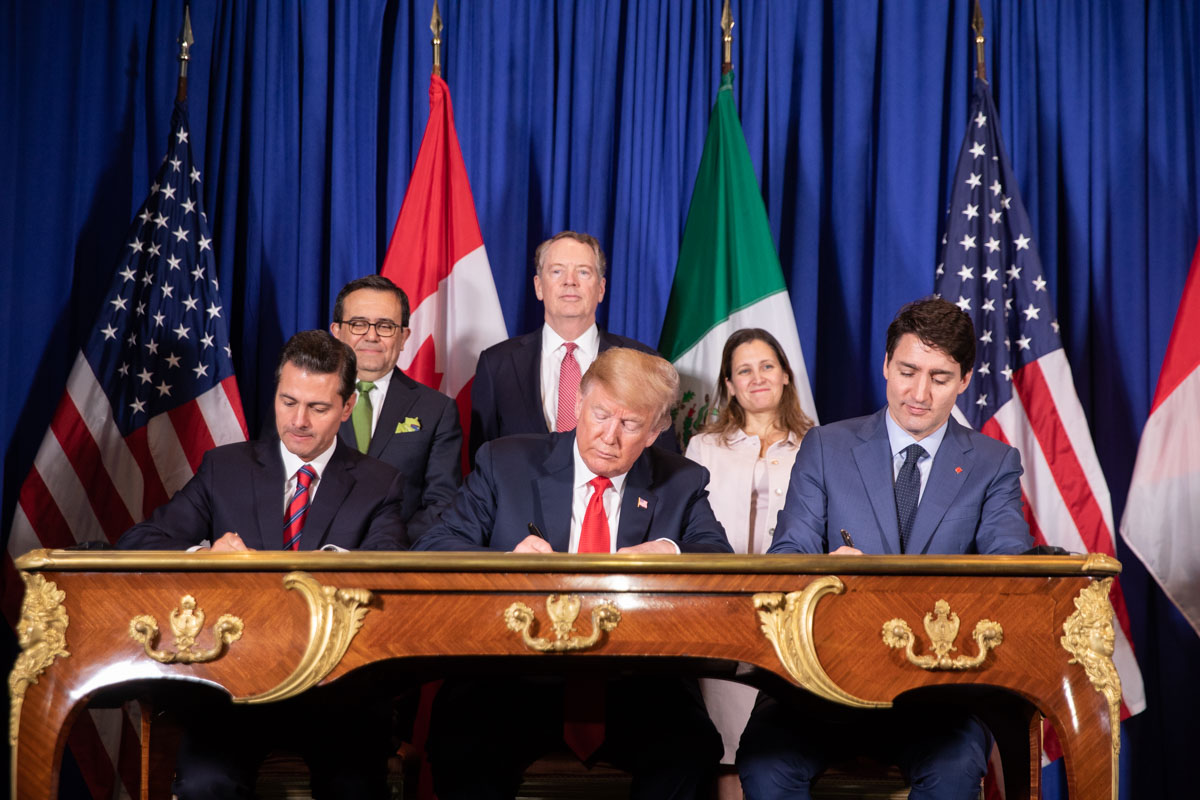
President Enrique Peña Nieto, President Donald Trump, and Prime Minister Justin Trudeau sign the agreement during the G20 summit in Buenos Aires, Argentina, on November 30, 2018.

Mexico, the United States, and Canada signed the North American Free Trade Agreement (NAFTA) in 1994 to eliminate barriers to trade and investment.

After securing the NAFTA treaty that integrated the Mexican and American economies, President Bill Clinton faced yet another foreign crisis in early 1995. The Mexican peso began to fall sharply and threatened the collapse of the Mexican economy. Clinton feared that a collapse would hurt the United States because of their close economic ties. He proposed a plan to address the financial crisis in Mexico, but many in Congress, fearing that constituents would not favor aid money to Mexico, rejected the plan. In response, Clinton used executive authority to create a $20 billion loan package for Mexico to restore international confidence in the Mexican economy. The loan went through, and Mexico completed its loan payments to the United States in January 1997, three years ahead of schedule. However, issues such as drug smuggling and immigration continued to strain relations.

=== Illegal immigration from Mexico ===
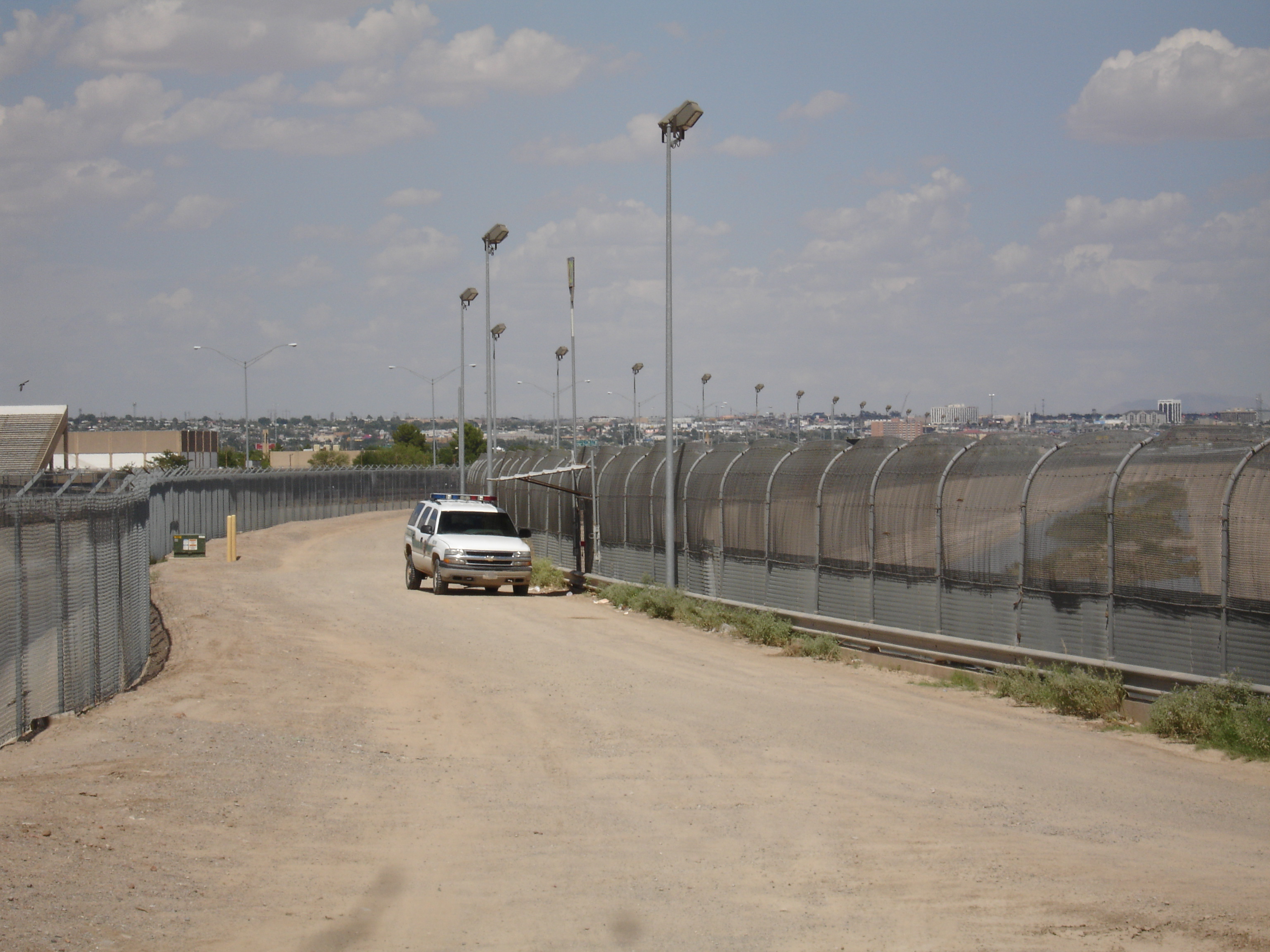
The U.S.–Mexico border fence near El Paso, Texas

In 2017, 47% of illegal immigrants in the United States originate from Mexico. The United States has built a barrier on much of its border with Mexico. In recent years, the majority crossing from Mexico into the United States have been from Central America.

=== Illegal trade of weapons ===
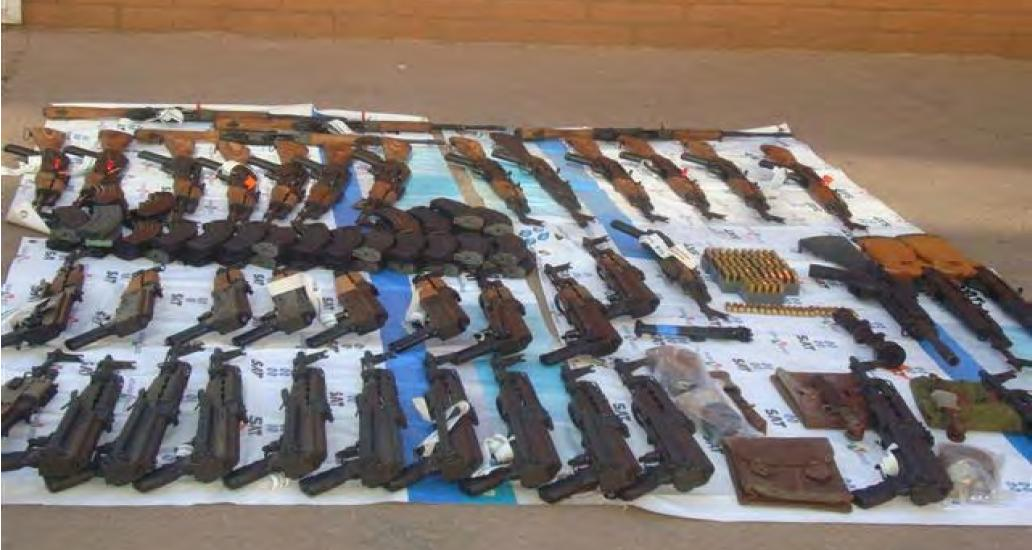
Weapons recovered by Mexican military in Naco, Sonora, Mexico on November 20, 2009. They include weapons bought two weeks earlier by an Operation Fast and Furious suspect.

The US is the largest source of illicit traffic of weapons traffic to Mexico. Many of the traceable weapons come from American weapons markets and festivals that do not have regulations for the buyers, and there is a geographic coincidence between the supposed American origin of the firearms and the places where these weapons are seized, mainly in the Northern Mexican states. Firearms that make their way to Mexico come from the American civilian market. Grenades are also smuggled from the US to Mexico. In an effort to control the smuggling of firearms, the U.S. government is assisting Mexico with technology, equipment, and training. Project Gunrunner was one such efforts between the U.S. and Mexico to collaborate in tracing Mexican guns which were manufactured in or imported legally to the U.S.

In 2015, Official reports of the U.S. government and the Bureau of Alcohol, Tobacco, Firearms and explosives (ATF) revealed that Mexican cartels improved their firearm power over that last years, and that 70% of their weapons come from the U.S.

==== ATF gunwalking scandal ====
The American ATF's Project Gunrunner has as its stated purpose the stoppage of the selling and exportation of guns from the United States into Mexico, to deny Mexican drug cartels the firearms considered "tools of the trade". However, in February 2011, it brought about a scandal when the project was accused of accomplishing the opposite by ATF permitting and facilitating "straw purchase" firearm sales to traffickers, and allowing the guns to "walk" and be transported to Mexico. Several of the guns sold under the Project Gunrunner were recovered from crime scenes in Arizona and at crime scenes throughout Mexico.

=== Obama administration ===
Mexico was not high on the priorities of the Obama Administration, but slow progress was made on security issues.

As of 2013, Mexican students formed the 9th largest group of international students studying in the United States, representing 1.7% of all foreigners pursuing higher education in the U.S.

=== First Trump administration ===
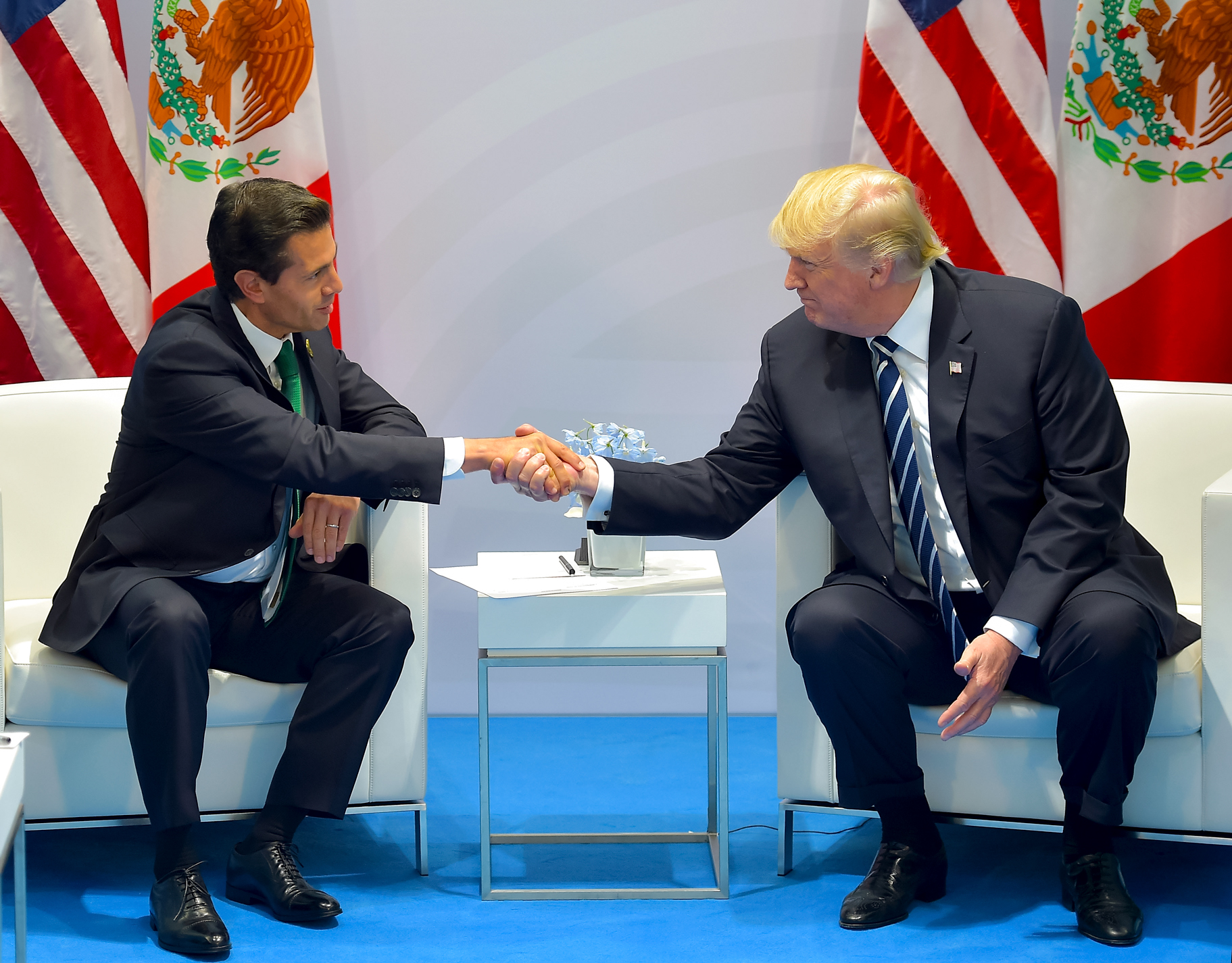
Peña Nieto meets with Donald Trump at the G20 Hamburg summit, July 2017.

The four-year term of President Donald Trump, who had provoked the ire of the Mexican government through threats against companies who invest in Mexico instead of the U.S., and his claims that he would construct a border wall and force Mexico to fund its construction, caused a decline in the relations of the two countries in the late 2010s.

A 2017 survey conducted by the Pew Research Center showed 65% of Mexicans had a negative view of the US, with only 30% having a positive view. This constituted a significant and abrupt drop from 2015, before the 2016 United States presidential election, when 67% of Mexicans had a positive view of the United States. The same study also showed only 5% of Mexicans had confidence in the then US leader, President Donald Trump, with 93% having no confidence in him. Similarly, a poll by YouGov showed that less than one in four Americans have a positive image of Mexico. Mexican visits to the US saw a 3% decrease under Trump's first term in office.

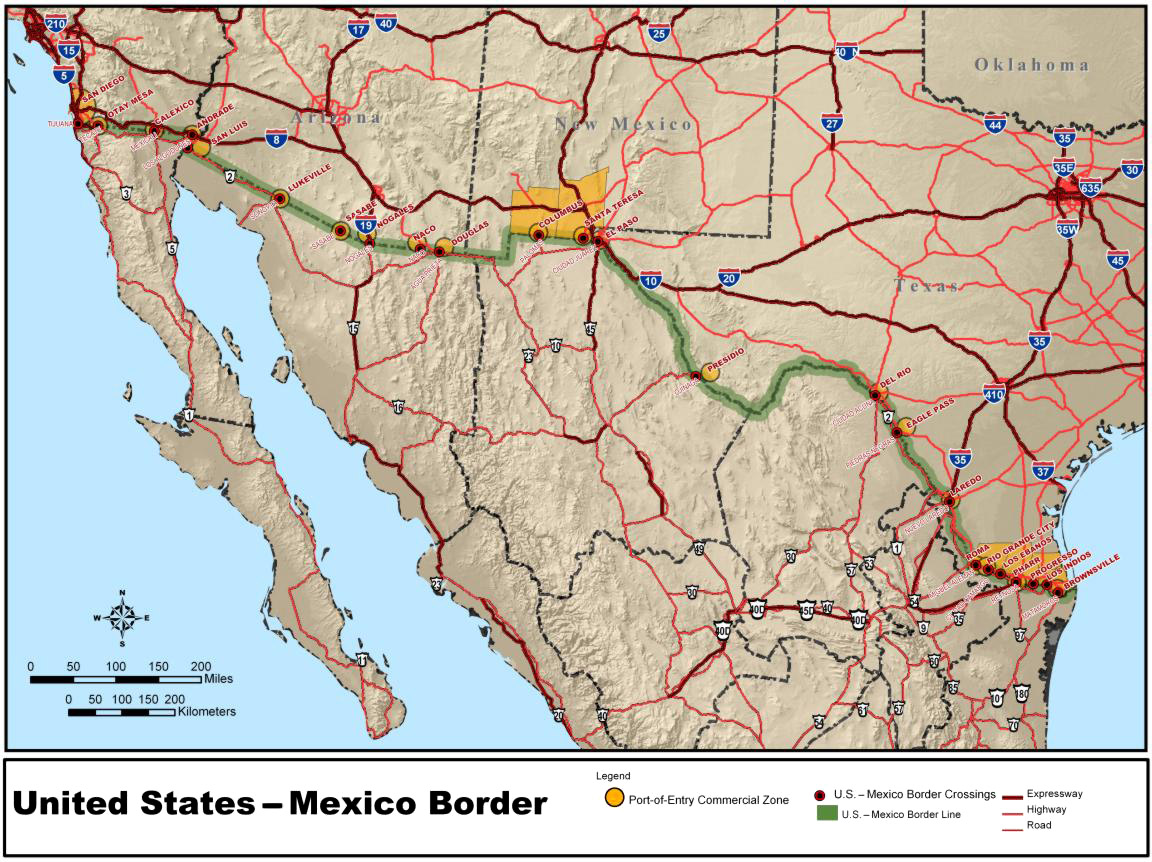
The border between Mexico and the United States spans four U.S. states and six Mexican states, and has over twenty commercial crossings.

Donald Trump won the 2016 U.S. presidential election partly with false campaign promises of building a border wall with Mexico. After Trump signed an executive order in January 2017, mandating construction of the wall, Mexican President Enrique Peña Nieto cancelled a scheduled visit to the U.S. Trump falsely said that Mexico would pay for the construction of the wall, but did not explain how; Mexico has in turn rejected the idea of any Mexican funding.

Peña Nieto listed ten goals he would seek in NAFTA negotiations, notably safeguarding the free flow of remittances, which amount to about $25 billion per year. In August 2018, Mexico and the United States reached a bilateral agreement on a revamped NAFTA trade deal, including provisions to boost automobile production in the U.S.

On December 1, 2018, Mexico inaugurated President Andrés Manuel López Obrador (known as AMLO) as president.

In June 2019, a promise of a stricter Mexican asylum program and security tightening to slow the traffic of illegal immigrants into the US averted a possible tariff war between the two countries. The US had threatened a 5% import tariff on all Mexican goods.

In April 2020, Mexico closed a plant run by an American company for refusing to sell ventilators to Mexican hospitals during the COVID-19 pandemic. The firm had operated its plant under the argument it provided an "essential" service, when most non-essential plants were closed. Baja California Governor Jaime Bonilla Valdez ordered the factory closed, because it was providing no essential service to Mexicans. He said the company contacted Mexico's Foreign Relations Secretary and the American ambassador to prevent the closure order, but that he did not cave in to pressure. On July 7, 2020, President Lopez Obrador visited Washington, D.C., and met with Trump following the signing of the United States–Mexico–Canada Agreement trade deal.

In late 2020, multiple human rights groups joined a whistleblower to accuse a private-owned U.S. immigration detention center in Georgia of forcible sterilization of women. The reports claimed a doctor conducted unauthorized medical procedures on women detained by the U.S. Immigration and Customs Enforcement (ICE). Some international organizations have characterized this forced sterilization as genocide. In September 2020, Mexico demanded more information from US authorities on procedures performed on migrants in these facilities, after allegations that six Mexican women were sterilized without their consent. Another woman said she had undergone a gynecological operation, although there was nothing in her detention file to support that she had agreed to the procedure.

In October 2020, retired Secretary of National Defense Salvador Cienfuegos was arrested by U.S. officials at Los Angeles International Airport on alleged drug and money-laundering charges. General Cienfuegos's arrest infuriated President Obrador, who was particularly riled that Mexican officials had not been informed about the investigation into the general. Cienfuegos was cleared of all charges on January 14, 2021, and Obrador said the accusations against him was politically motivated. The U.S. Justice Department threatened to restart prosecution if Mexico didn't prosecute him.

=== Biden administration ===
On February 25, 2021, it was announced that through the Mérida Initiative, the United States and Mexico have forged a partnership to combat transnational organized crime and drug trafficking while strengthening human rights and the rule of law. Mérida promotes greater cooperation between U.S. and Mexican law enforcement, prosecutors and judges as they share best practices and expand capabilities to track criminals, drugs, weapons and money to disrupt the business model of transnational criminal organizations.

In March, the Biden administration confirmed it would not be sharing its COVID-19 vaccines with Mexico, according to White House press secretary Jen Psaki ahead of Biden's first bilateral meeting with Mexican President Andrés Manuel López Obrador. "The president has made clear that he is focused on ensuring vaccines are accessible to every American." When Biden took office, Mexico had sought more cooperation with the US to increase Mexico's access to COVID-19 vaccine supplies.

In May, US regulators banned Mexican airlines from expanding new service or routes in the country. The FAA claimed there were "several areas" where the country did not meet aviation standards. President Obrador stated, "We have been complying with all the requirements. We feel that this decision should not be carried out." Further stating the move appeared to help US airlines. "They are the ones who benefit, and the national airlines could be harmed." As Mexico's airlines focused on domestic flights, the US ban was expected to have less impact.

In July 2021, President López Obrador blamed the US embargo against Cuba for contributing to the unrest in Cuba. The foreign ministry sent two navy ships with food and medical supplies to assist Cuba. In September 2021, Mexico sued US-based gunmakers in Smith & Wesson Brands, Inc. v. Mexico for trafficking guns into the country. The lawsuit stated that guns from America are more likely to kill Mexican citizens than American citizens. US laws, however, protect gun makers from civil liability and prevent victims from suing manufacturers.

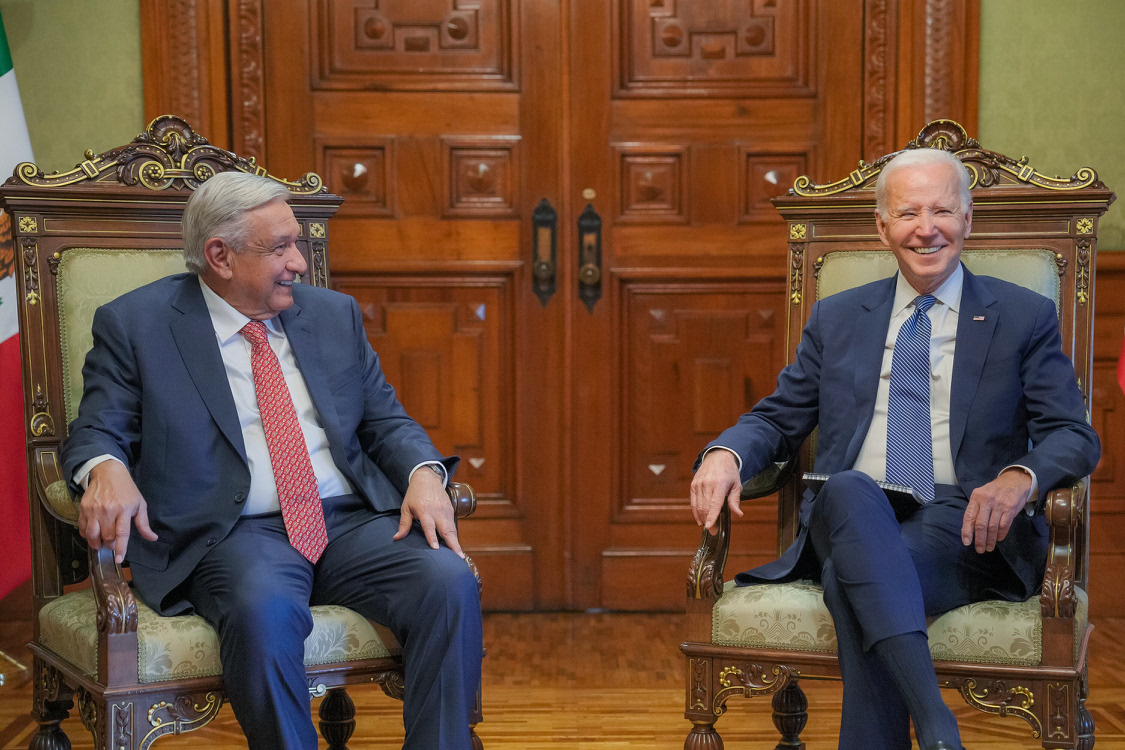
U.S. President Joe Biden traveled to Mexico City to meet with Mexican President Andrés Manuel López Obrador as part of the 2023 North American Leaders' Summit.

In January 2023, President Joe Biden traveled to Mexico to attend the North American Leaders' Summit in Mexico City. In April 2023, Mexico's President Andres Manuel Lopez Obrador said during a news conference that Mexico would not tolerate any spying on his government by the United States, which had resulted in leaks being published by the Washington Post.

In 2023, Republican members of the US Congress threatened to invade Mexico to stop cartels, but was noted by others as attempted resource extraction. Mexican President Obrador has stated that "We are not going to permit any foreign government to intervene in our territory, much less that a government's armed forces..."

In 2024, President Obrador proposed sweeping changes to the government of the country, including the judiciary. In August several US senators sent a letter to the president expressing concerns about the proposed changes, and US Ambassador Ken Salazar openly criticized the changes, prompting Obrador to "pause" relations with the US.

=== CIA involvement in the war on drugs ===
The CIA has maintained a drone program in Mexico and run operations to search for those involved in drug cartels. Sheinbaum has described the drone program as a collaboration. In May 2026, CNN reported that the CIA had been involved in several "deadly attacks" in Mexico.

=== Second Trump administration ===
During his presidential campaign, Trump threatened to impose 25% tariffs on all Mexican goods unless Mexico stopped the flow of immigrants into the United States. The Mexican government has signaled its intention to tackle trade restrictions.

During the second Trump Administration, the CIA plans to expand its role fighting drug cartels in Mexico through intelligence sharing and local training.

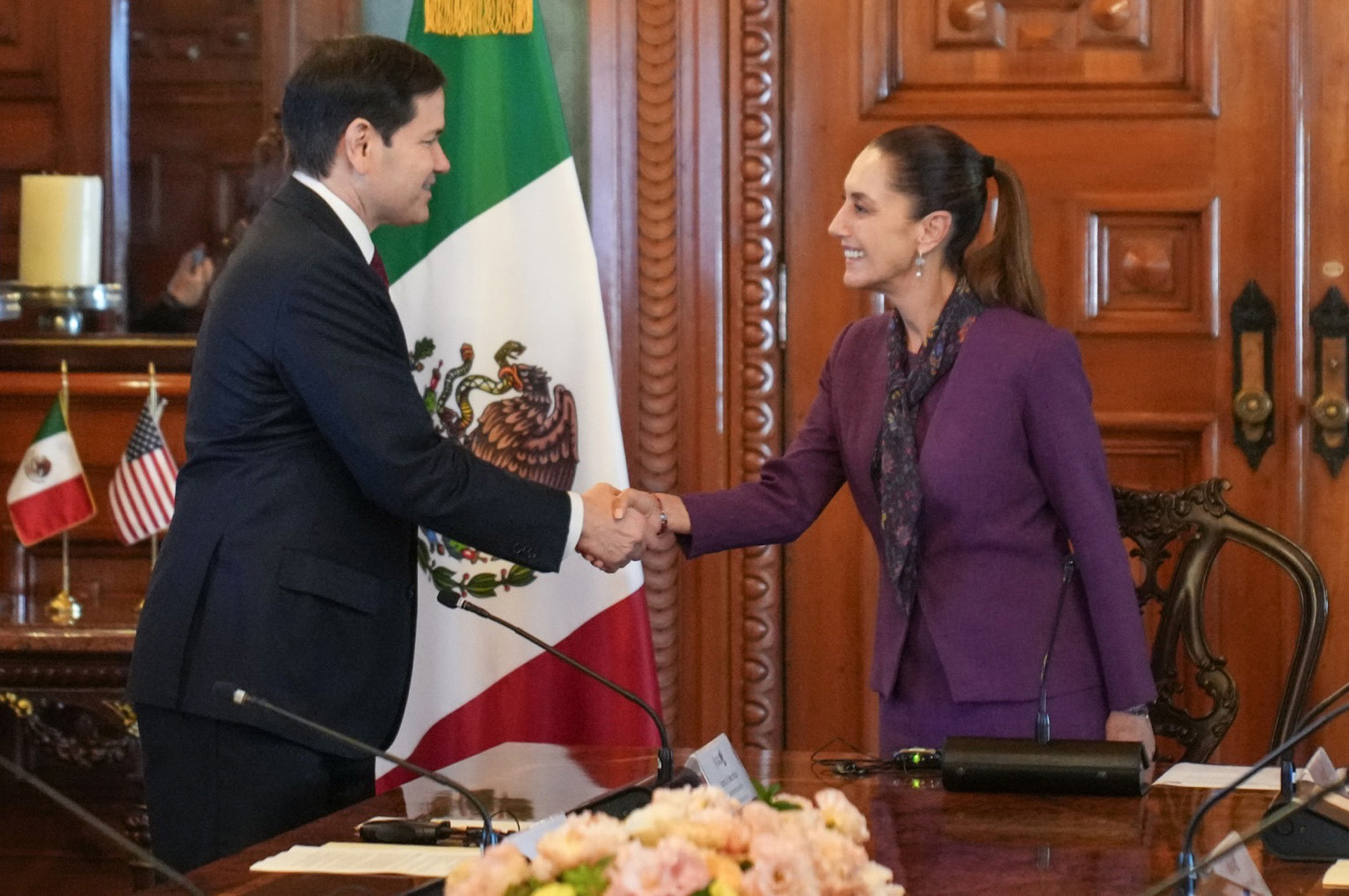
U.S. Secretary of State Marco Rubio traveled to Mexico City in September 2025 to meet with Mexican President Claudia Sheinbaum.

==== 2025 tariff threats ====
On March 4, 2025, the United States imposed 25% tariffs on Mexican goods. On March 6, President Donald Trump delayed tariffs on goods compliant with the United States–Mexico–Canada Agreement (USMCA)—accounting for approximately 50% of imports from Mexico. Although the exemption was expected to end on April 2, the U.S. said it would continue indefinitely.

Trump said the tariffs are intended to reduce the U.S. trade deficit with Mexico, force the country to secure its border with the U.S. against illegal immigration and the smuggling of fentanyl, and encourage domestic manufacturing in the United States. The opioid crisis in the United States is largely fueled by drugs smuggled from Mexico; approximately 98% of fentanyl entering the U.S. comes from Mexico. In 2021 and 2022, during the worst years of the opioid epidemic, over 100,000 people in the U.S. died annually from drug overdoses. Trump launched a process to designate Mexican drug cartels and other criminal organizations as foreign terrorist organizations. He also threatened U.S. military intervention against cartels in Mexico which Sheinbaum claims to have rejected.

In April 2025, Trump threatened tariffs and sanctions against Mexico over its failure to meet water delivery obligations under the 1944 U.S.-Mexico Water Treaty. With the current five-year cycle ending in October, Mexico had delivered less than 30% of the required 1.75 million acre-feet, prompting Trump to accuse it of “stealing water from Texas farmers”. Mexican President Claudia Sheinbaum cited severe drought and affirmed Mexico was complying “as water is available.” Mexico proposed immediate deliveries, including 122,000 acre-feet, and discussions with U.S. officials followed. As Donald Trump rattles the global economy with punitive tariffs, nearly two-thirds of Mexicans surveyed in May 2025 said their country should trade more with China than the United States, according to the monthly LatAm Pulse survey conducted by AtlasIntel for Bloomberg News.

==== Mexican lawsuit against U.S. weapons manufacturers tossed ====
On June 5, 2025, the Supreme Court of the United States (SCOTUS) ruled unanimously that claims within a Mexican Government lawsuit brought against 7 major American gun manufacturers were "too tenuous to try to hold the companies liable for guns eventually being used in murders and robberies." The lawsuit filed by the Mexican Government alleged the manufacturers had not done enough to prevent the firearms from reaching the drug cartels and other criminal organizations. The court held that their ruling against the Mexican Government was "due to a lack of a convincing argument that the companies willingly allow such transactions to happen."

== Economic ties ==
Since 1994, the United States and Mexico have tightened their economic ties. The US is Mexico's largest trading partner. For the US, Mexico is the largest trading partner as of 2023, surpassing both Canada and China. In 2017, two-way trade between both nations amounted to US$521.5 billion. The trade in goods and services totaled $677 billion in 2019. Exports to Mexico were $289 billion; imports were $388 billion. The trade in goods rose to US$797.9 billion in 2023.

Oil and natural gas in particular are traded between the two countries, as well as complex industrial goods such as machinery, electronics, electrical equipment, and automobiles. With the conclusion of NAFTA, Mexico has become an important investment location for US companies, with investments amounting to over $130 billion (2022). Many car manufacturers have production facilities in Mexico for the American market, including major US brands such as General Motors and Ford, where they benefit from lower production costs. US investments have changed the economic geography in Mexico, with many border cities such as Ciudad Juárez or Tijuana specializing in trade with the neighbouring country. Nearly 80 percent of Mexican exports are destined for the U.S. Mexico has also become an important market for U.S. companies. For example, Mexico is one of the most important markets for Coca-Cola products, which is considered a reason for widespread obesity among many Mexicans.

Tourism is also an important economic factor in Mexico, and Americans make up the largest group of foreign tourists in the country. Between January and April 2024, over 5 million tourists from the US visited the country. Mexicans living abroad remitted over $27 billion to their home country in 2017. The majority of these remittances come from the United States. Remittances are therefore an important economic factor, accounting for 2.6 % of economic output.

The open borders have led to an increase in drug smuggling since the 1990s. According to estimates, Mexican cartels earn between 19 and 29 billion US dollars annually from drug sales in the USA. The drug trade has made many cartels so rich that they have gained control over many regions of Mexico and are challenging the state's monopoly on the use of force.

US-Mexico goods trade in billions of U.S. dollars (1990−2023)
	1990	2000	2010	2015	2020	2021	2022	2023
US exports to Mexico	28.3	111.3	163.7	236.5	212.5	277.2	324.2	322.7
US imports from Mexico	30.2	135.9	230.0	296.4	323.5	382.6	452.0	475.2
Trade balance	−1.9	−24.6	−66.3	−60.0	−111.1	−105.4	−127.8	−152.5

== Migration ==
Mexican Americans by state (2010)

With the passage of the Immigration Act of 1924, which restricted immigration from Southern and Eastern Europe, immigration from Mexico began to increase. In the 1940s, the Bracero Program became the largest recruitment program of all time and resulted in the signing of 5 million labor contracts over the next 20 years. In 2021, there were over 37 million Mexican Americans living in the U.S., nearly 10 million of whom were born in Mexico. Most Mexican Americans live in the southwestern U.S. (over half in the states of California and Texas). The movement for the emancipation of Mexican immigrant workers began in the 1950s under César Chávez and the civil rights movement of Mexican Americans known as the Chicano Movement. A vibrant Mexican-American culture and cuisine has established itself in the USA.

Also, over half of all illegal immigrants in the U.S. were from Mexico in 2017, making securing the border with Mexico a contentious political issue in the United States. However, starting in the 2010s, legal and illegal migration from Mexico decreased significantly and most illegal border crossings in the early 2020s were from migrants from Central America. Between 2007 and 2019, the number of Mexican migrants in the US actually fell.

An increasing number of immigrants from the US are living in Mexico. Between 1.2 and 1.5 million Americans live in Mexico (2019). These include repatriated Mexican Americans, but also retirees who have chosen the country as their retirement home.

== Cultural relations ==
A shared culture between Mexico and the United States is most apparent in the borderlands, with history and migration influencing this in the formerly Mexican territories of the Southwestern United States. Since the 19th century, both Mexico and the American South have had certain parallel reactions to the American North.

Americanization has become more visible in Mexico since the mid-20th century, though it contends with regional diversity and historical impulses against American domination, which are shaped by a history starting mainly in the 19th century of economic inferiority and expansionist pressure being placed on northern Mexico. A broader linking together of North American cultures (including Canada) coinciding with economic integration has become apparent in the 21st century.

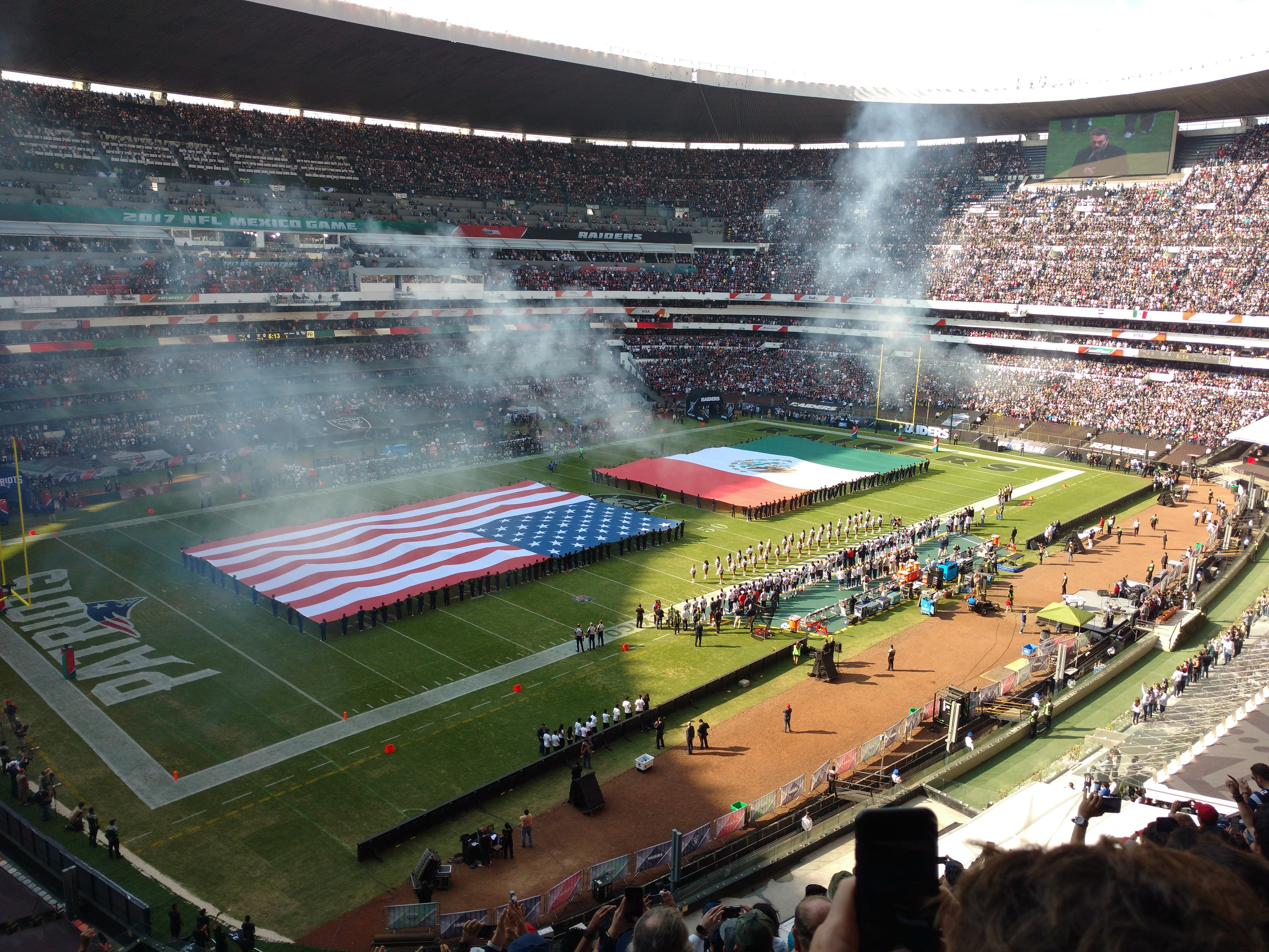
NFL game in Mexico

=== Sports ===
Several NFL games have been played in Mexico, with the largest NFL game attendance in history having taken place in 2005 at Estadio Azteca.

== Public opinion ==
According to a 2026 Pew Research Center survey, 40% of Mexicans had a favorable view of the United States, while 55% had a negative view.

== Gallery ==
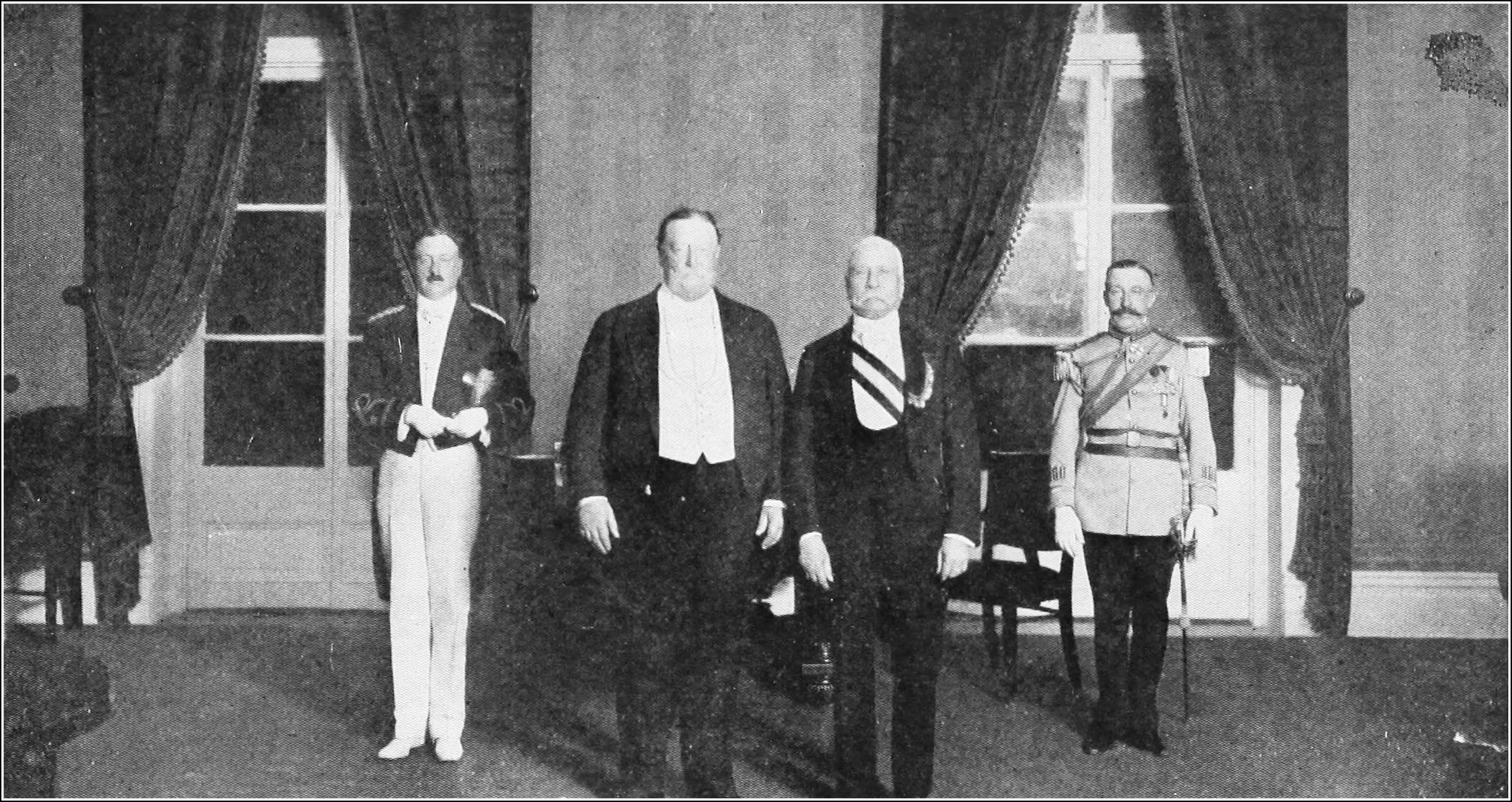
Mexican President Porfirio Díaz and U.S. President William Taft in El Paso, October 1909.

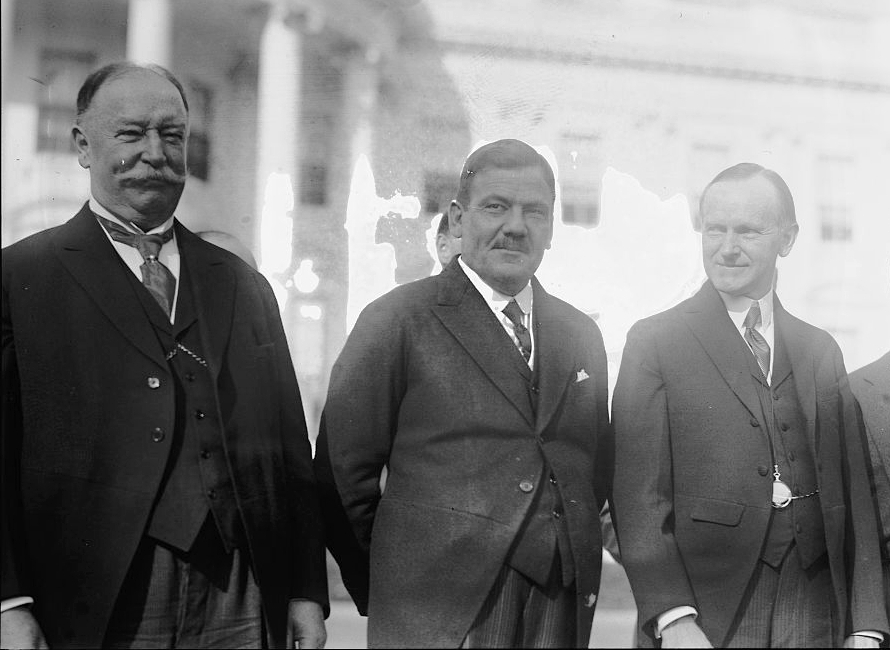
Chief Justice and Former U.S. President William Taft, Mexican President Plutarco Elías Calles, and U.S. President Calvin Coolidge at the White House, 1924.

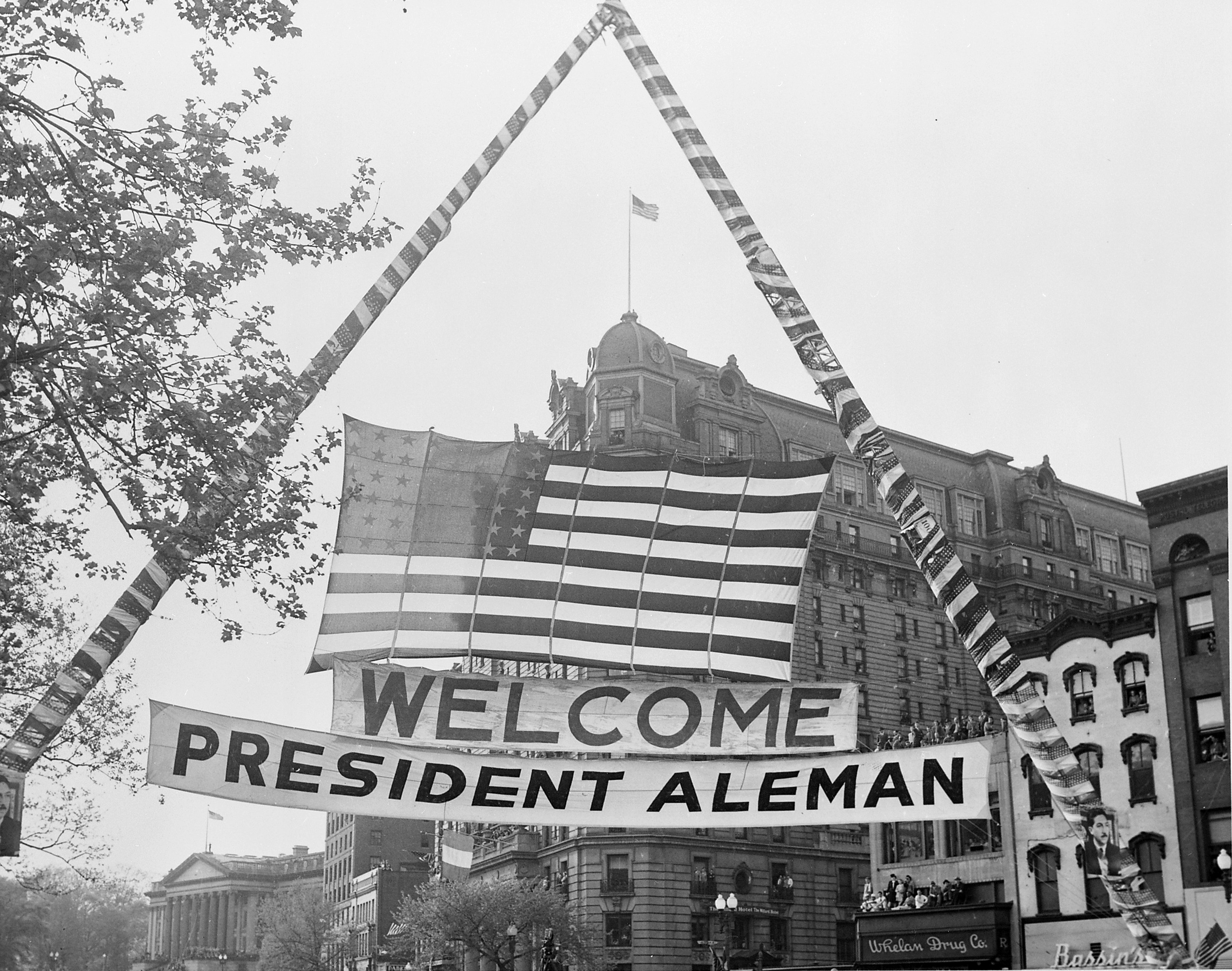
Photograph of U.S. flag and welcoming banner hung over a Washington street during ceremonies in honor of visiting Mexican President Miguel Alemán Valdés, 1947.

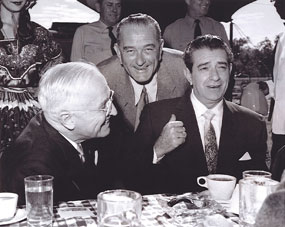
U.S. Senate Majority Leader Lyndon B. Johnson and former U.S. President Harry S. Truman having dinner with Mexican President Adolfo López Mateos in 1959.

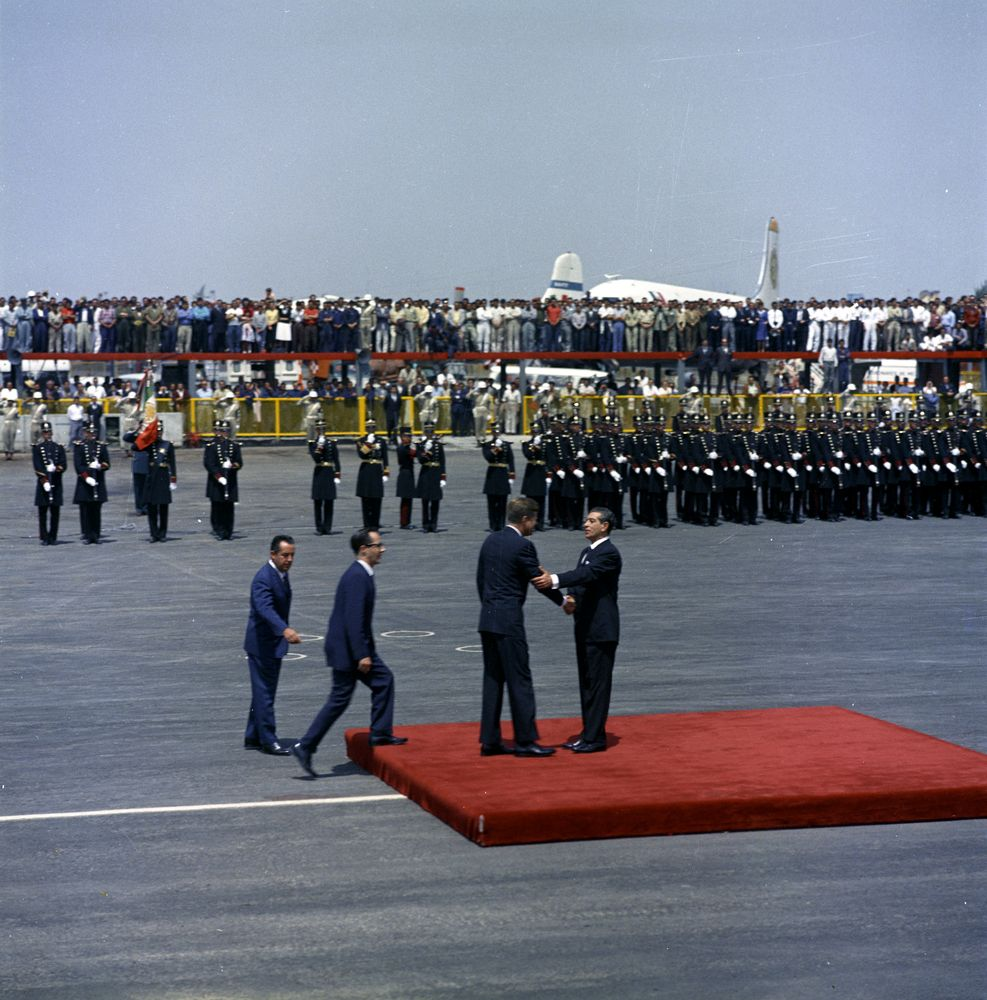
U.S. President John F. Kennedy greeting Mexican president Adolfo López Mateos at Mexico City International Airport in June 1962.

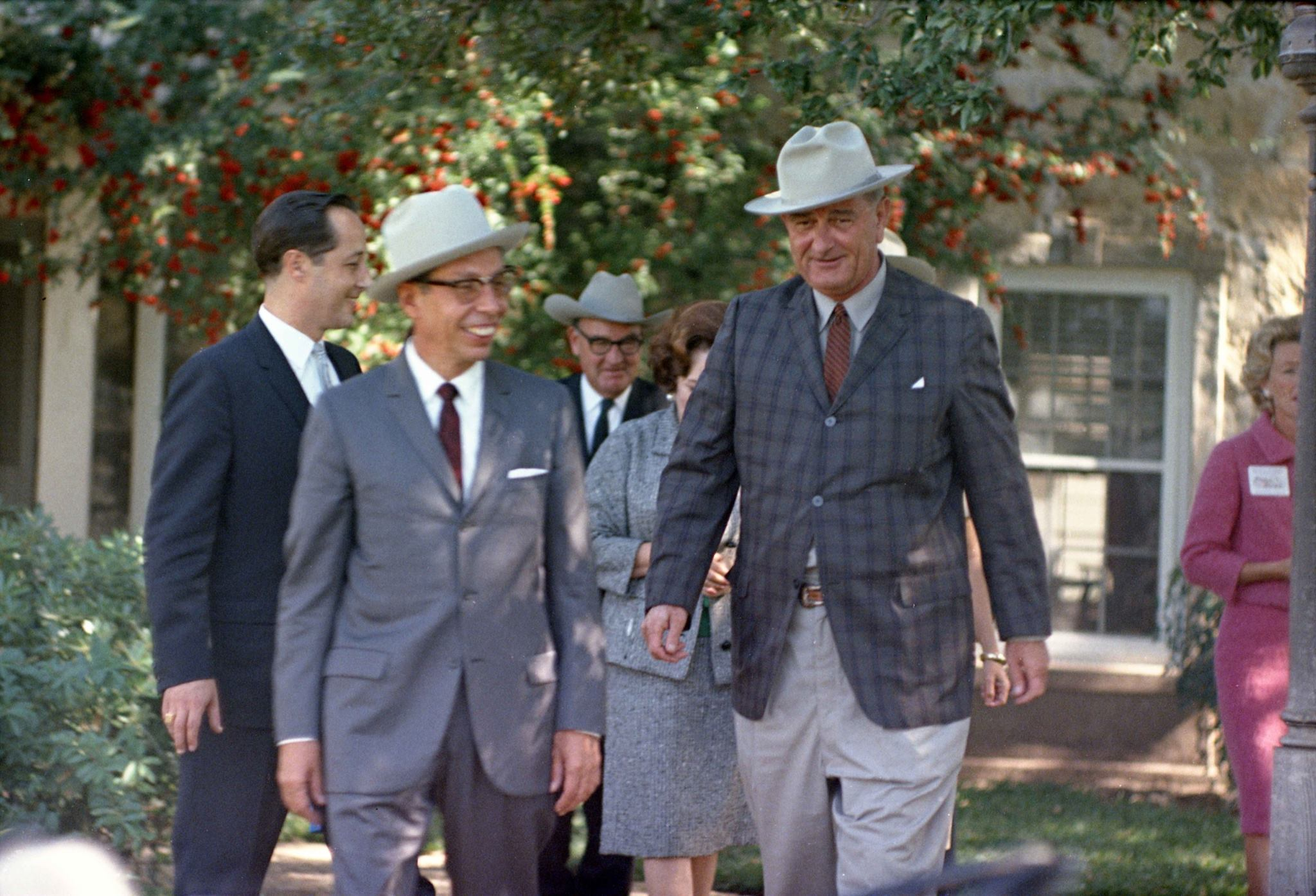
President Lyndon B. Johnson hosts the President of Mexico Gustavo Díaz Ordaz at his Texas Ranch, 1964.

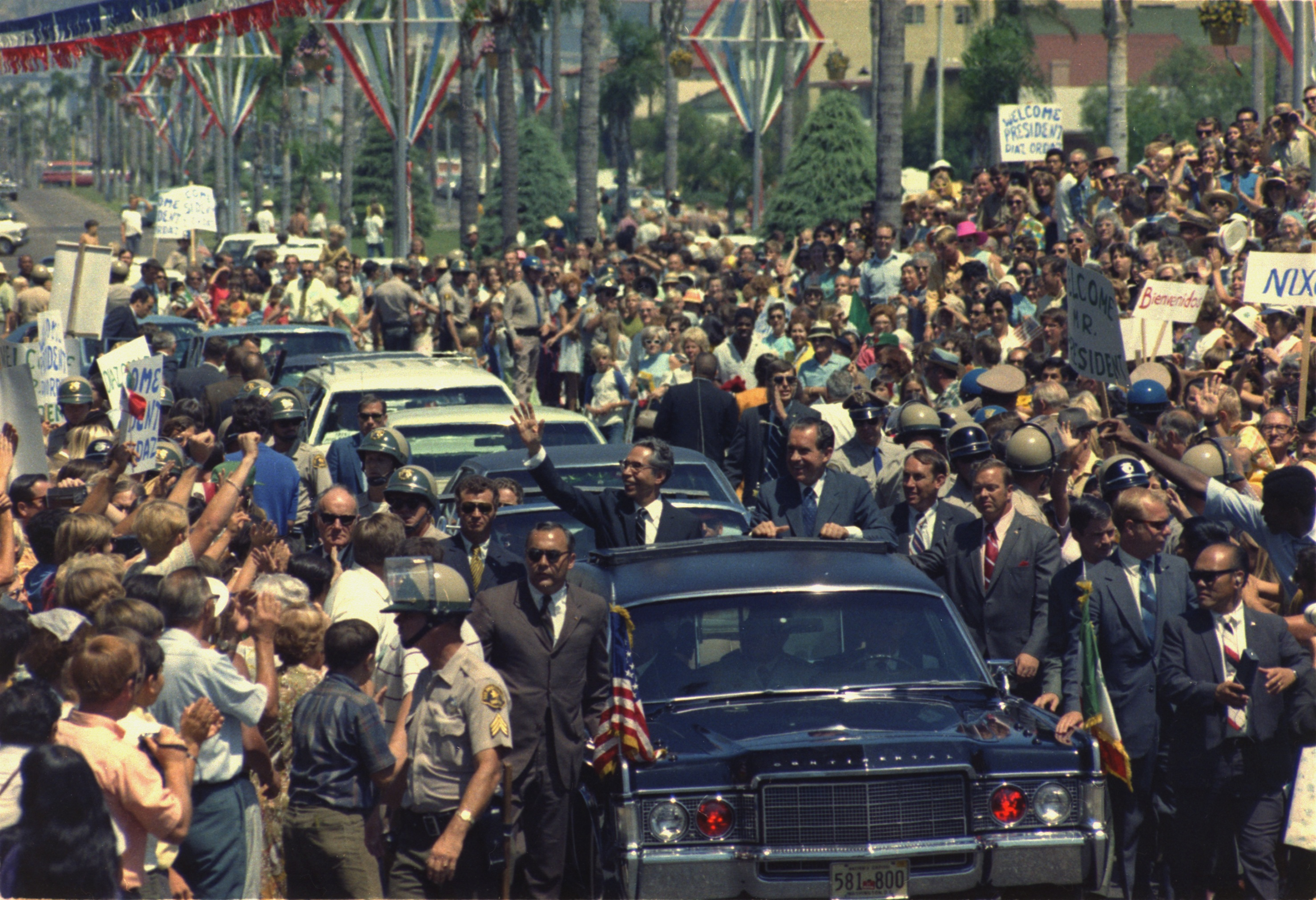
U.S. President Richard Nixon riding a presidential motorcade in San Diego with Mexican President Gustavo Díaz Ordaz, 1970.

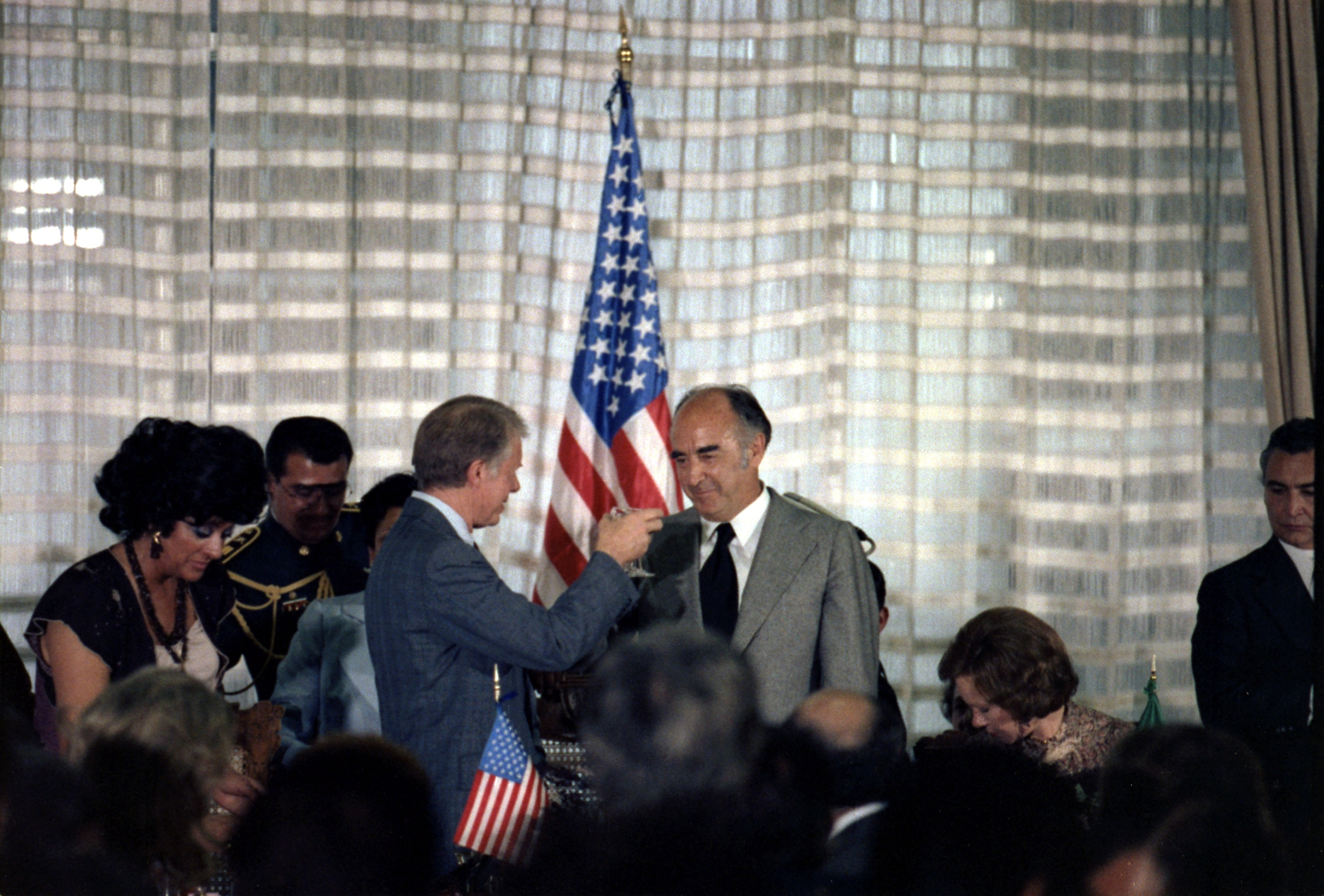
U.S. President Jimmy Carter (left) and Mexican president José López Portillo (right) toast during a luncheon hosted by the President of Mexico, 1979.

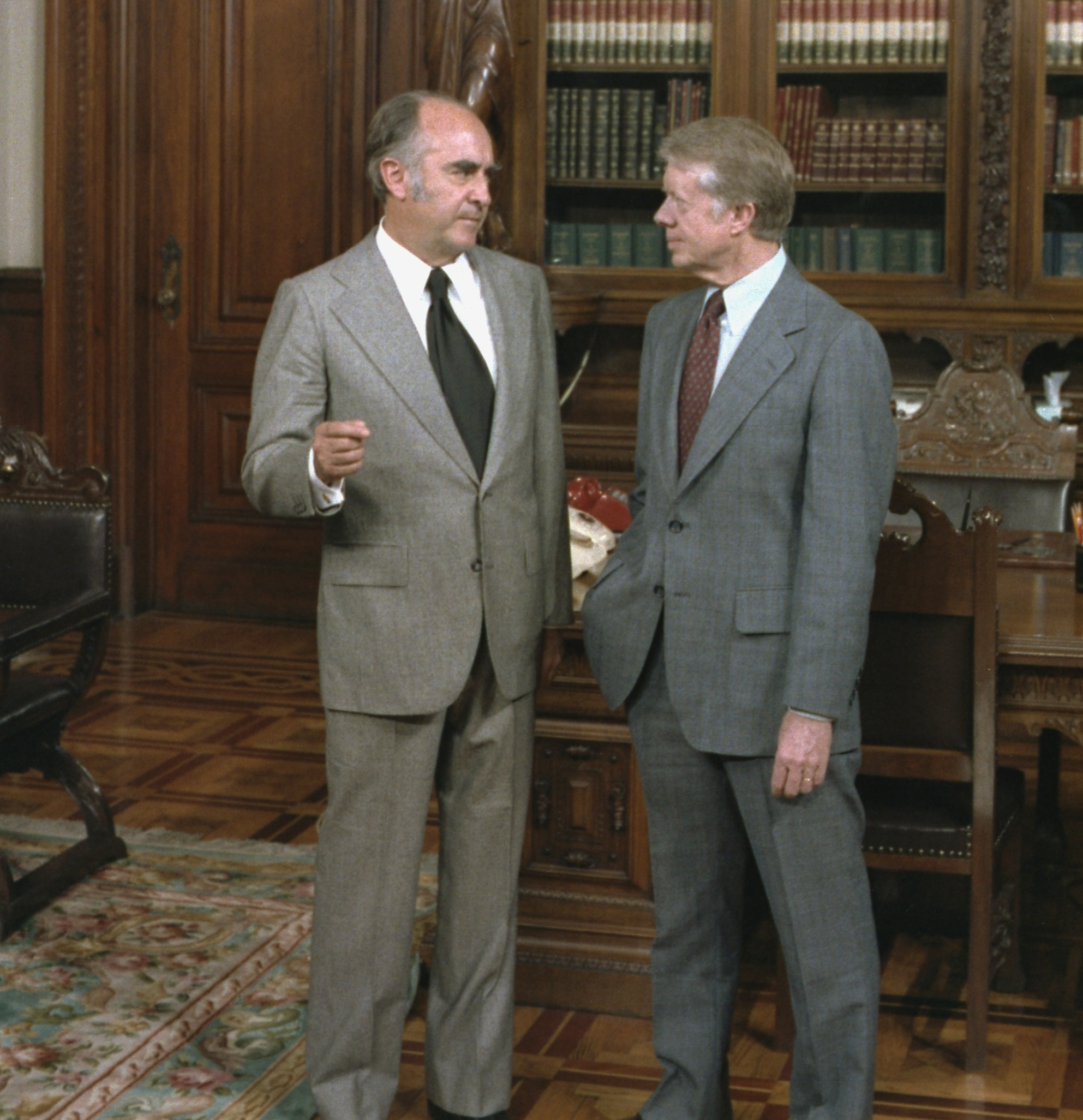
Mexican President José López Portillo and U.S. President Jimmy Carter during a welcoming ceremony in Mexico City, 1979.

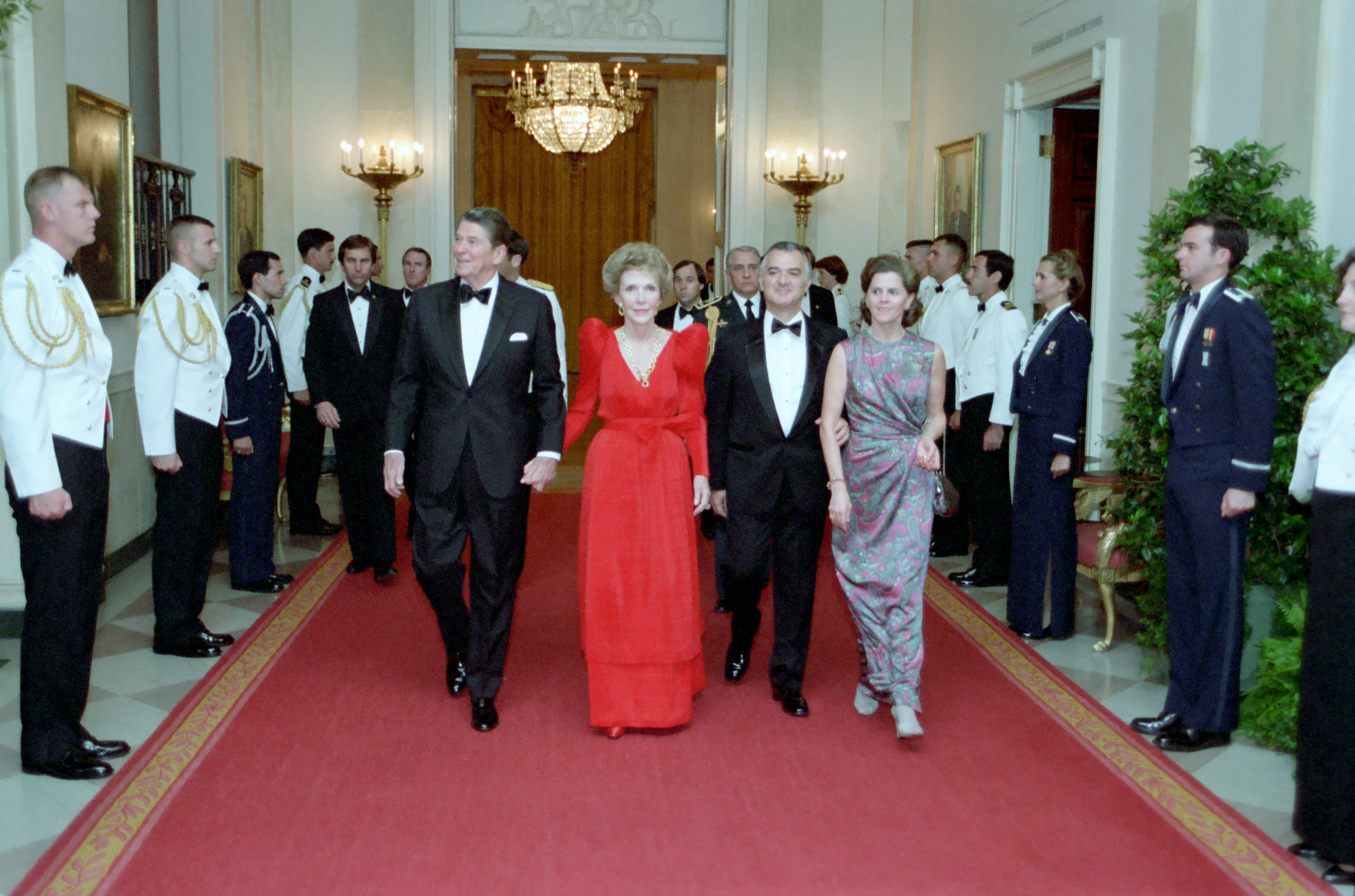
From left to right: U.S. President Ronald Reagan, his wife Nancy, Mexican President Miguel de la Madrid and his wife Paloma Cordero in Cross Hall, White House, during a state dinner, 1984.

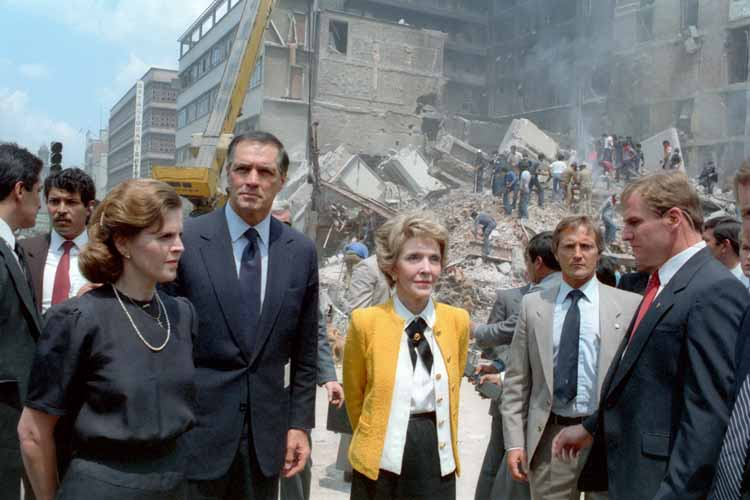
First ladies Paloma Cordero of Mexico (left) and Nancy Reagan of the United States (right) with U.S. Ambassador to Mexico, John Gavin, observing damage from by 1985 Mexico City earthquake, 1985.

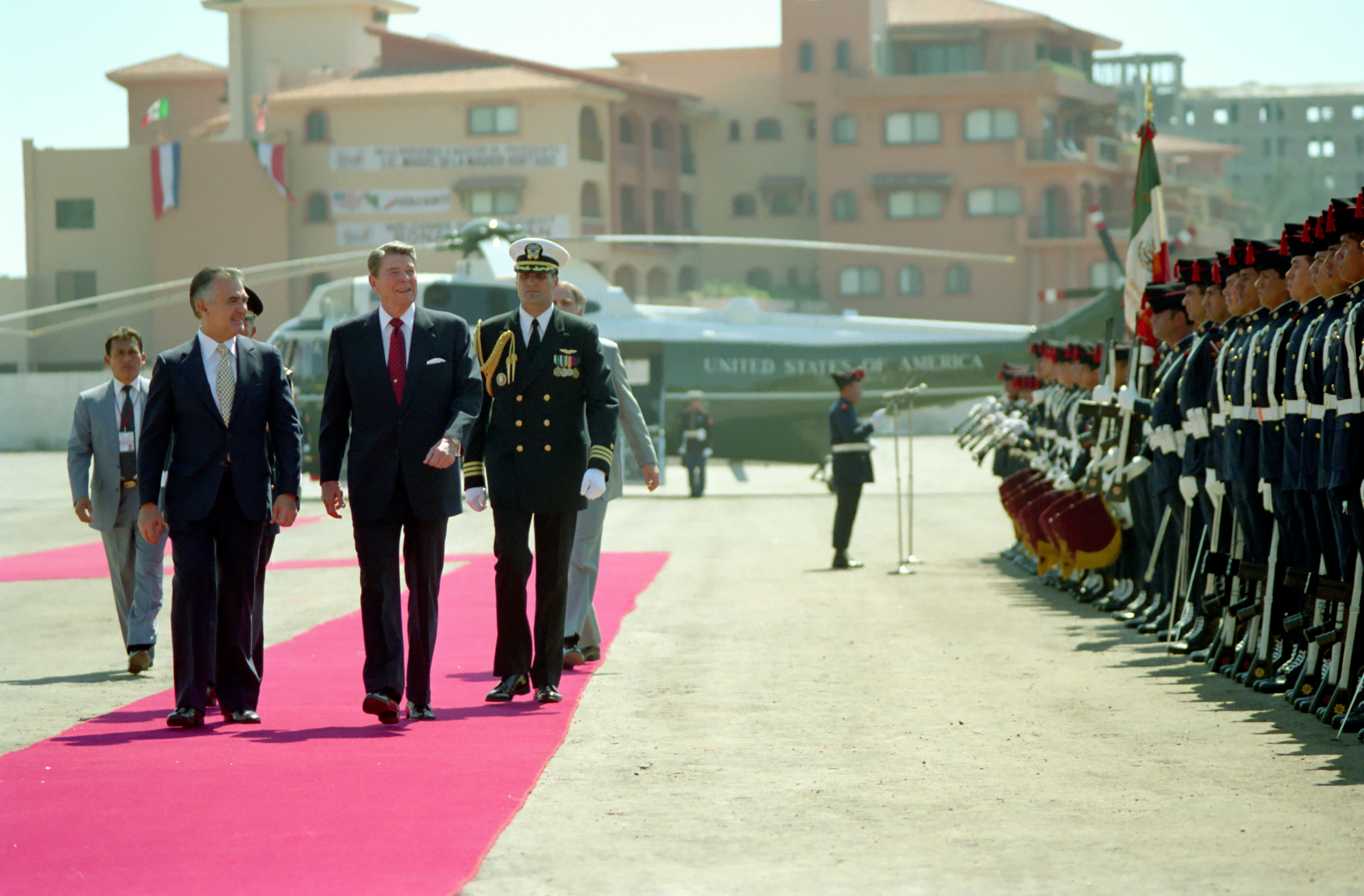
Mexican President Miguel de la Madrid and U.S. President Ronald Reagan in Mazatlán, 1988.

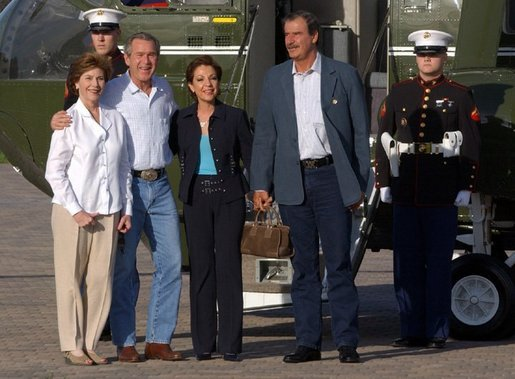
U.S. First Lady Laura Bush, U.S. President George W. Bush, Mexican First Lady Marta Sahagún, and Mexican President Vicente Fox in Crawford, Texas, 2004.

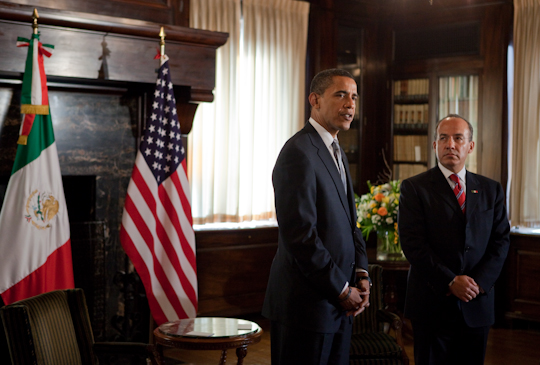
U.S. President-elect Barack Obama and Mexican President Felipe Calderón at the Mexican Cultural Institute in Washington, D.C., January 2009.

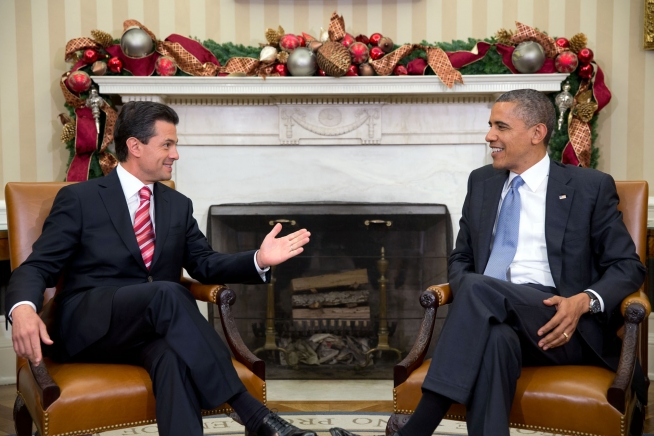
U.S. President Barack Obama and Mexican President-Elect Enrique Peña Nieto meet at the White House following Peña Nieto's election victory, 2012.

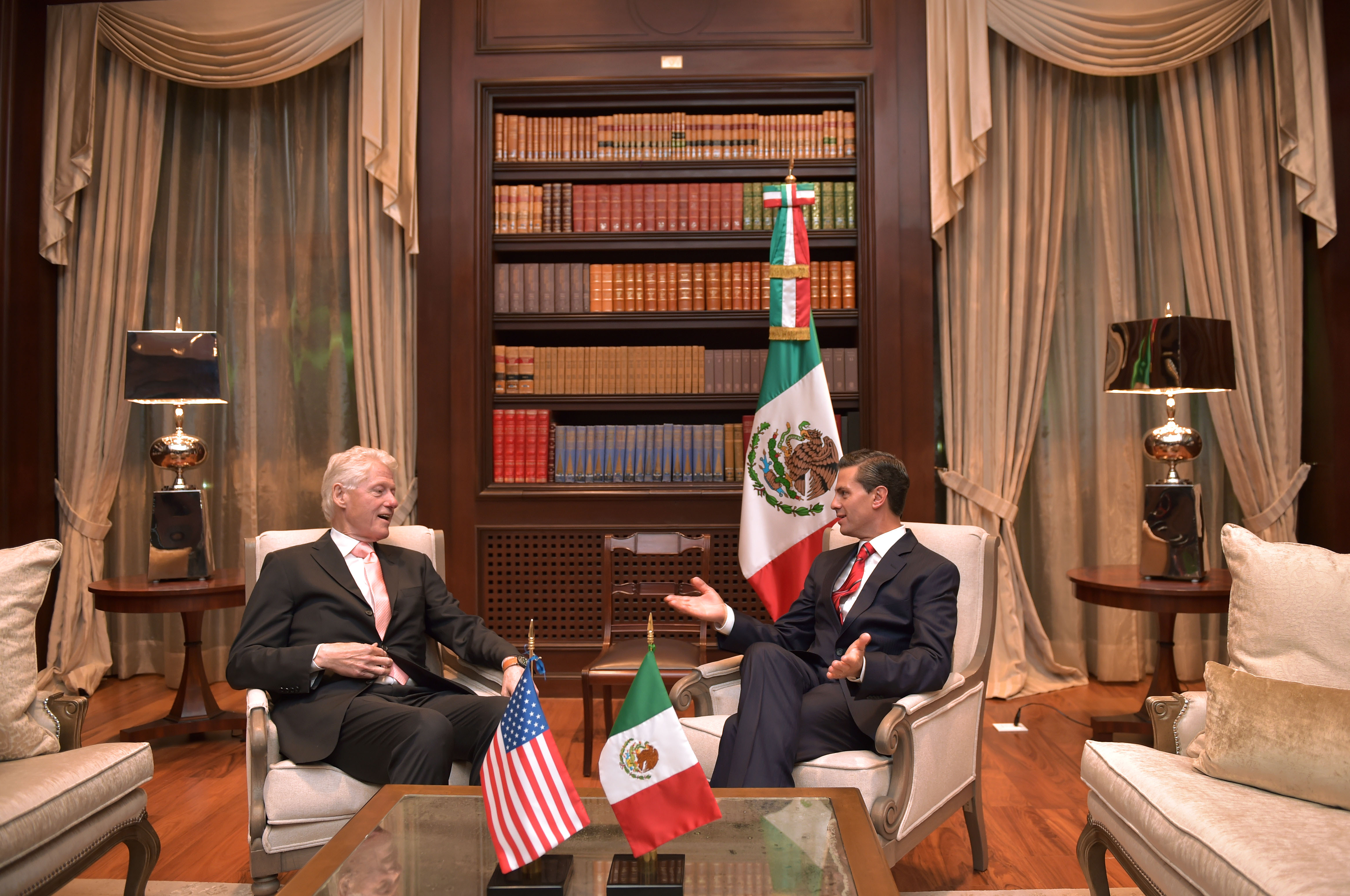
Meeting with the former President of the United States Bill Clinton and Mexican President Enrique Peña Nieto at Los Pinos, 2015.

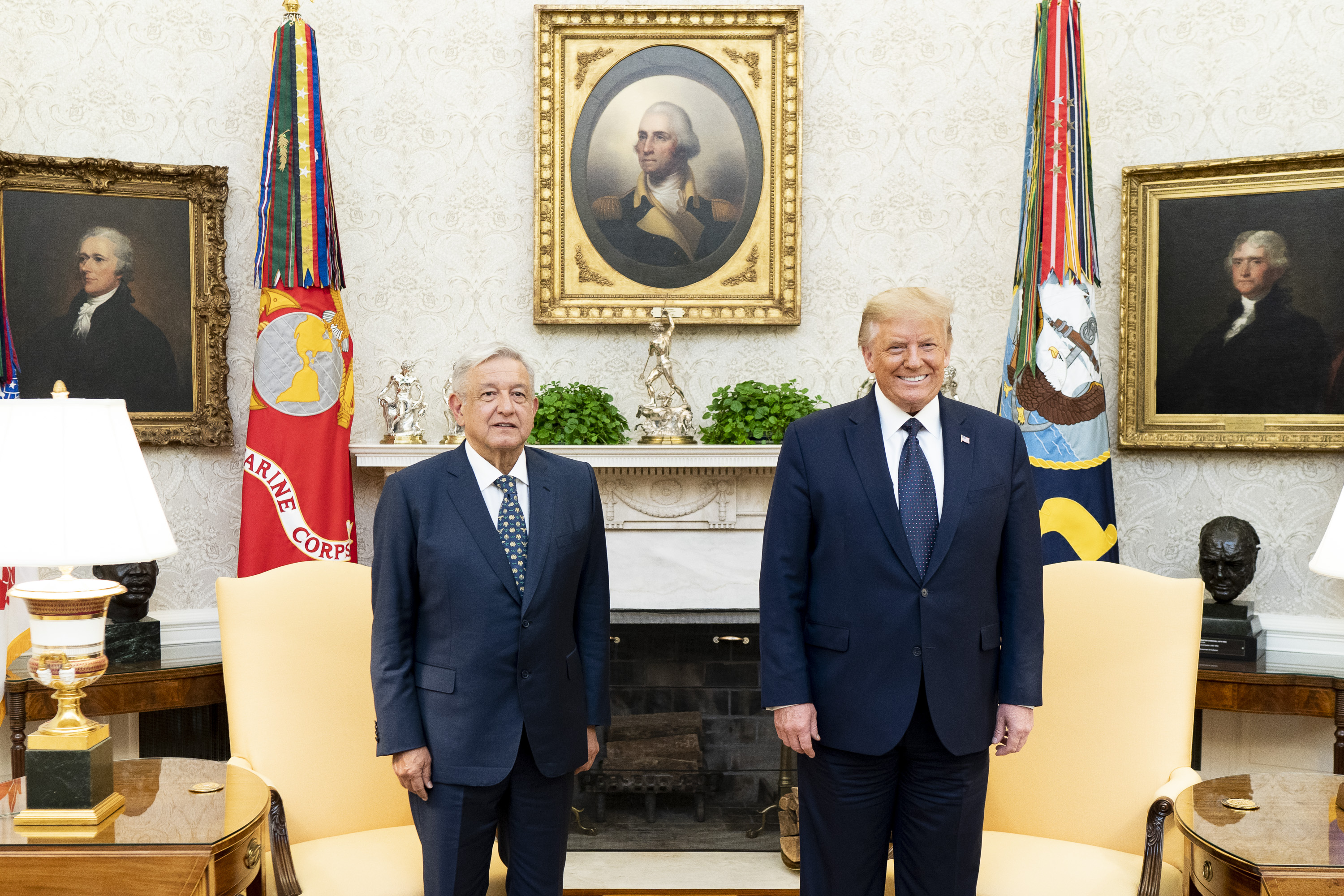
U.S. President Donald Trump and Mexican President Andrés Manuel López Obrador in the Oval Office, White House, during the latter's visit in Washington, D.C., 2020.

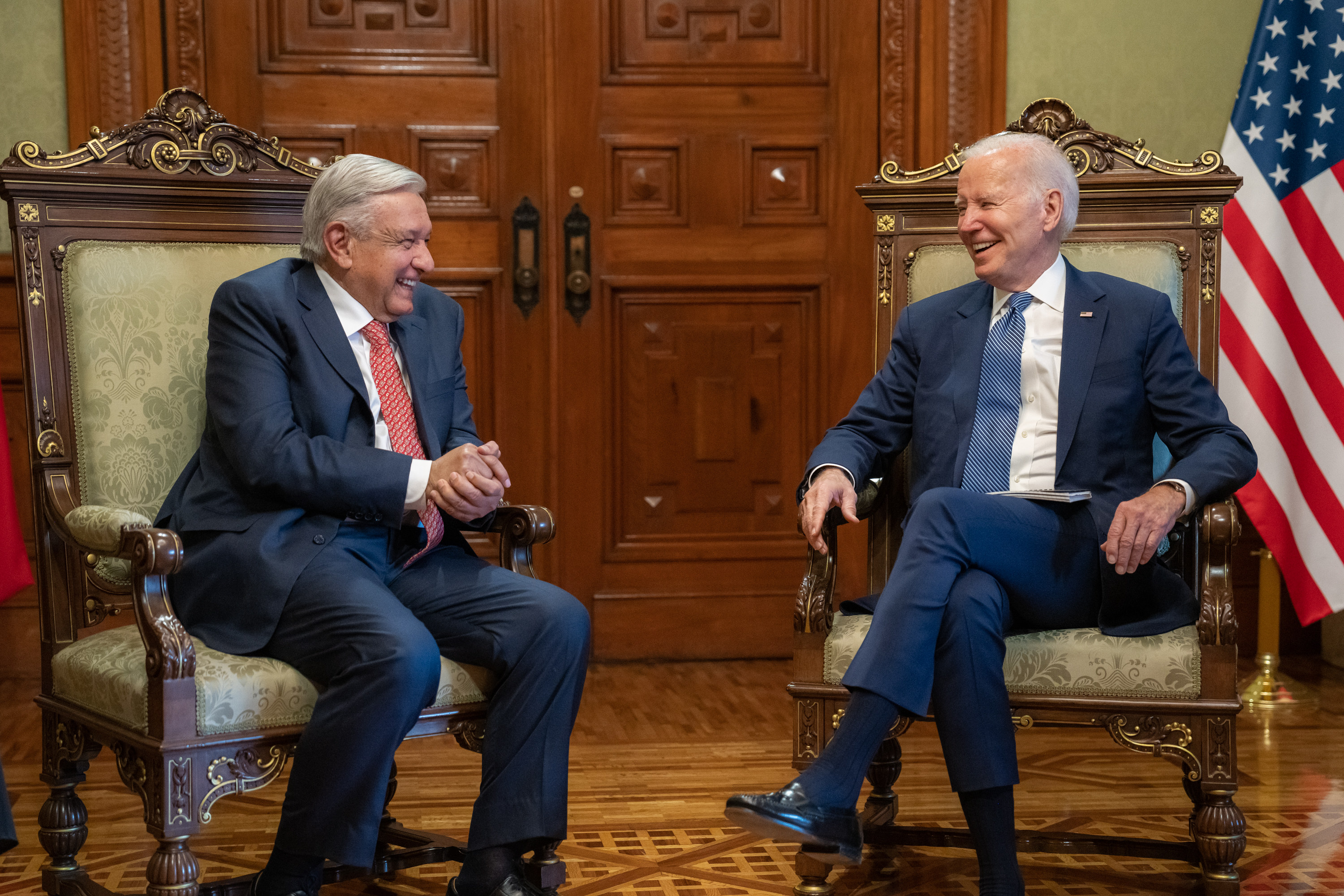
U.S. President Joe Biden and Mexican President Andrés Manuel López Obrador in a one-on-one private meeting in Mexico City, 2023.

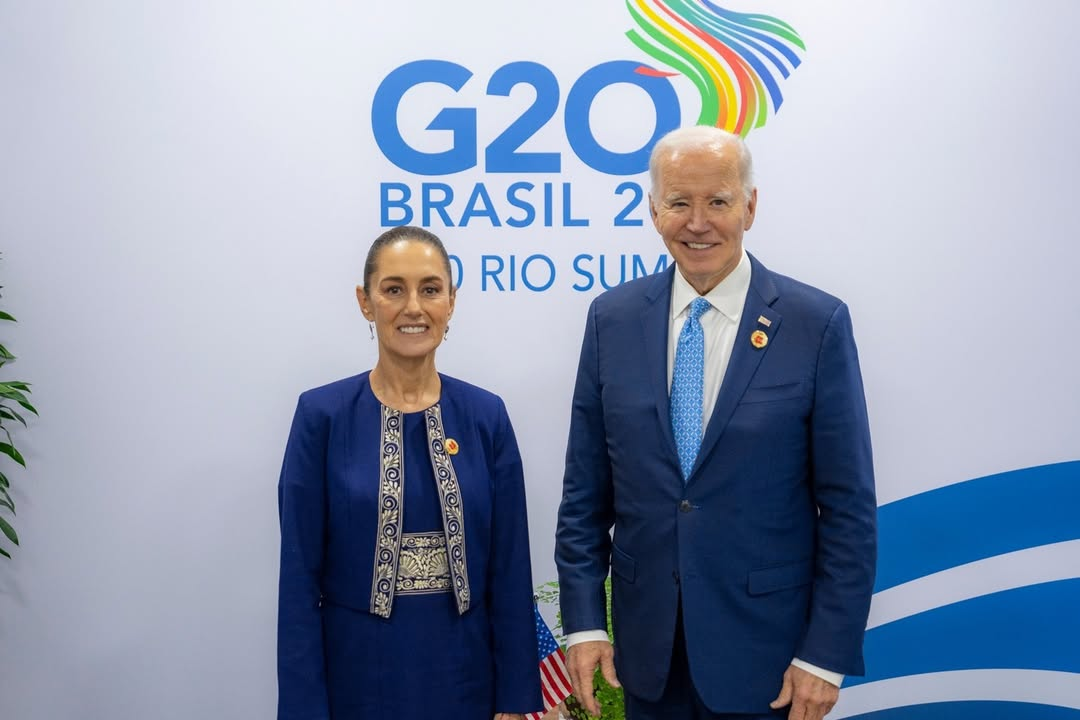
U.S. President Biden and Mexican President Claudia Sheinbaum, November 2024.

Mexican President Claudia Sheinbaum and U.S. President Donald Trump in Shenzhen, China; November 2026.

== Diplomatic missions ==
of the United States in Mexico

- Mexico City (Embassy)
- Ciudad Juárez (Consulate General)
- Guadalajara (Consulate General)
- Hermosillo (Consulate General)
- Matamoros (Consulate General)
- Mérida (Consulate General)
- Monterrey (Consulate General)
- Nogales (Consulate General)
- Nuevo Laredo (Consulate General)
- Tijuana (Consulate General)
- Acapulco (Consular Agency)
- Cabo San Lucas (Consular Agency)
- Cancún (Consular Agency)
- Mazatlán (Consular Agency)
- Oaxaca (Consular Agency)
- Piedras Negras (Consular Agency)
- Playa del Carmen (Consular Agency)
- Puerto Vallarta (Consular Agency)
- San Miguel de Allende (Consular Agency)

of Mexico in the United States

- Washington, D.C. (Embassy)
- Atlanta (Consulate-General)
- Austin (Consulate-General)
- Boston (Consulate-General)
- Chicago (Consulate-General)
- Dallas (Consulate-General)
- Denver (Consulate-General)
- El Paso (Consulate-General)
- Houston (Consulate-General)
- Laredo (Consulate-General)
- Los Angeles (Consulate-General)
- Miami (Consulate-General)
- New York City (Consulate-General)
- Nogales (Consulate-General)
- Phoenix (Consulate-General)
- Raleigh (Consulate-General)
- Sacramento (Consulate-General)
- San Antonio (Consulate-General)
- San Diego (Consulate-General)
- San Francisco (Consulate-General)
- San Jose (Consulate-General)
- San Juan, Puerto Rico (Consulate-General)
- Albuquerque (Consulate)
- Boise (Consulate)
- Brownsville (Consulate)
- Calexico (Consulate)
- Del Rio (Consulate)
- Detroit (Consulate)
- Douglas (Consulate)
- Eagle Pass (Consulate)
- Fresno (Consulate)
- Indianapolis (Consulate)
- Kansas City (Consulate)
- Las Vegas (Consulate)
- Little Rock (Consulate)
- McAllen (Consulate)
- Milwaukee (Consulate)
- New Brunswick (Consulate)
- New Orleans (Consulate)
- Oklahoma City (Consulate)
- Omaha (Consulate)
- Orlando (Consulate)
- Oxnard (Consulate)
- Philadelphia (Consulate)
- Portland (Consulate)
- Presidio (Consulate)
- Saint Paul (Consulate)
- Salt Lake City (Consulate)
- San Bernardino (Consulate)
- Santa Ana (Consulate)
- Seattle (Consulate)
- Tucson (Consulate)
- Yuma (Consulate)

== Common memberships ==
- Asia-Pacific Economic Cooperation
- Bank for International Settlements
- CONCACAF
- FIFA
- Food and Agriculture Organization
- G-20
- International Atomic Energy Agency
- International Chamber of Commerce
- International Court of Justice
- International Olympic Committee
- International Monetary Fund
- International Telecommunication Union
- Interpol
- North American Free Trade Agreement
- Organisation for Economic Co-operation and Development
- Organization of American States
- Pan American Sports Organization
- Security and Prosperity Partnership of North America
- UNESCO
- United Nations
- World Bank
- World Health Organization
- World Trade Organization

== See also ==
- Emigration from Mexico
- Treaty of Guadalupe Hidalgo, of 1848
