= Enrique de la Madrid Cordero =

Mexican politician

Enrique de la Madrid
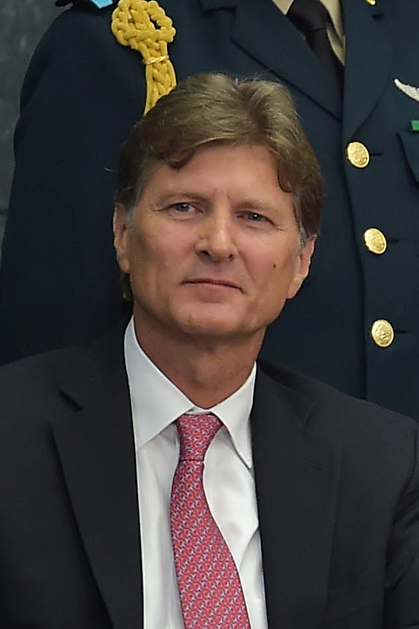
- de la Madrid in 2017
- Born: Enrique Octavio de la Madrid Cordero; October 1, 1962 (age 64); Mexico City, Mexico
- Education: National University of Mexico; John F. Kennedy School of Government
- Occupations: Politician, lawyer
- Political party: Institutional Revolutionary

Enrique Octavio de la Madrid Cordero (Mexico City, born 1 October 1962) is a Mexican lawyer, public official, columnist and politician. He is a member of the Institutional Revolutionary Party.

== Biography ==
He is the son of Paloma Cordero, former First Lady of Mexico, and Miguel de la Madrid, former Mexican President (1982–1988). He was a federal congressman as a member of the PRI.

Enrique de la Madrid has a law degree from the National Autonomous University of México (UNAM) and has a Master's in Public Administration from the John F. Kennedy School of Government at Harvard University. He was a professor at ITAM (Autonomous Technical Institute of México) from 1996 to 1998.

== Public official ==
Among the public offices he has held are the general technical coordinator of the Presidency of the National Bank and Securities Commission (CNBV) from 1994 to 1996. He earned a seat as a federal congressman in 2000, serving in the Chamber of Deputies until 2003 whereupon he left office to run for the position of borough chief for the Alvaro Obregón precinct of Mexico City (he lost to the PRD candidate).

In 2006, President Felipe Calderón named him general director of Financiera Rural (a rural development bank) and he served there until July 31, 2010. On December 6, 2012, Enrique de la Madrid was named CEO of the National Foreign Trade Bank (Bancomext) by President Enrique Peña Nieto.

On August 27, 2015, De la Madrid took over as Tourism Secretary.

== Private sector ==
In the business sector, De la Madrid was executive president of the Mexican Council for the Consumer Industry (ConMéxico) and served as director of the Institutional Relations and Corporate Communications office for Mexico and Latin America at the HSBC bank.

== Media ==
He recently published his first book, titled “México en la generación del desarrollo” ("Mexico in the generation of development"). It was published by Random House. In the book, De la Madrid analyzes Mexico's achievements and its comparative advantages and proposes that the nation can achieve full development this generation.

He has also been a newspaper columnist at both Reforma and Milenio, as well as for several newspapers owned by the Organización Editorial Mexicana. He is currently a columnist with El Universal and takes part as a commentator in Leonardo Curzio's program "Primera Emisión de Enfoque". On 12 August 2026, he was unveiled as the new host of ¿Quién quiere ser millonario?, the Mexican version of Who Wants to Be a Millionaire?.
