= ¿Quién quiere ser millonario? (Mexican game show) =

- Logo (2010)
- Presented by: Pablo Latapí Ortega (2010–2012); Enrique de la Madrid Cordero (2026–present)
- Country of origin: Mexico
- No. of seasons: 3

Production
- Executive producer: Jose V Scheuren
- Running time: 44 minutes
- Production companies: Cinemat Inc; TV Azteca

Original release
- Network: Azteca 13
- Release: 23 March 2010 – 23 June 2012
- Network: Azteca Uno
- Release: 27 September 2026 – present

¿Quién quiere ser millonario? (English: Who wants to be a millionaire?) is a Mexican game show based on the original British format of Who Wants to Be a Millionaire?, which aired on Azteca 13 from 2010 to 2012 and again from 2026 on Azteca Uno. It was hosted by Pablo Latapí Ortega in its original run and by Enrique de la Madrid Cordero for the revival.

The aim of the game is to win MX$1,000,000 (in 2010 $3,000,000 and in 2012 $1,500,000) by answering fifteen multiple-choice general knowledge questions with four possible answers correctly.

In 2010 and 2012 contestants had the three classic lifelines: 50:50, Phone a Friend and Ask the Audience. In the 2026 revival, Ask the Audience was replaced by Switch the Question.

== Money tree ==
Question number	Question value		
Question number	2010	2012	2026
1	$1,000	$500	$1,000
2	$2,500	$1,000	$2,000
3	$3,500	$2,500	$3,000
4	$4,200	$3,500	$5,000
5	$6,500	$4,200	$10,000
6	$8,000	$6,500	$20,000
7	$13,000	$8,000	$30,000
8	$25,000	$13,000	$50,000
9	$32,000	$25,000	$80,000
10	$50,000	$35,000	$150,000
11	$100,000	$50,000	$200,000
12	$180,000	$100,000	$300,000
13	$400,000	$180,000	$400,000
14	$1,500,000	$400,000	$500,000
15	$3,000,000	$1,500,000	$1,000,000
