= ConMéxico =

Founded in 1996, ConMéxico (Consejo Mexicano de la Industria de Consumo A.C.) is a group formed by the biggest companies in Mexico, such as Grupo Alpura, Gruma Grupo Bimbo, PepsiCo, Nestlé, and Unilever.

== Members ==
The members that form ConMéxico are:

- Barcel, S.A. de C.V.
- Bimbo, S.A. de C.V.
- Casa Cuervo, S.A. de C.V.
- Clorox de México
- Compañía Procter & Gamble de México, S. de R.L. de C.V.
- Conagra Foods México, S.A. de C.V.
- Conservas La Costeña, S.A. de C.V.
- Grupo Alpura, S.A. de C.V.
- Grupo Bafar, S.A. de C.V.
- Grupo Danone de México, S.A. de C.V.
- Grupo Gamesa, S. de R.L. de C.V.
- Grupo Industrial Lala, S.A. de C.V.
- Grupo Jumex, S.A. de C.V.
- Grupo Maseca, S.A. de C.V.
- Herdez, S.A. de C.V.
- Industrias AlEn, S.A. de C.V.
- Kellogg de México, S. de R.L. de C.V.
- Nestlé México, S.A. de C.V.
- PepsiCo de México, S.A. de C.V.
- S.C. Johnson and Son, S.A. de C.V.
- Sigma Alimentos Corporativo, S.A. de C.V.
- Unilever de México, S.A. de C.V.

== About ==
ConMéxico has actively participated in several regulatory and competition discussions in Mexico, representing the interests of the consumer goods industry.

In areas such as health regulation and fair competition, the organization seeks to promote balanced conditions that foster investment, innovation, and the long-term competitiveness of the sector.

The companies that make up ConMéxico hold a strong market presence.

== Sources ==
- Spanish http://www.conmexico.com.mx/
