= Paloma Cordero =

First Lady of Mexico (1937–2020)

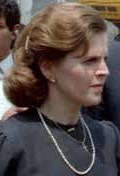
- Cordero touring the aftermath of the 1985 Mexico City earthquake

First Lady of Mexico
- In office December 1, 1982 – November 30, 1988
- President: Miguel de la Madrid
- Preceded by: Carmen Romano
- Succeeded by: Cecilia Occelli

Chairwoman of the National System for Integral Family Development
- In office December 1, 1982 – November 30, 1988

Personal details
- Born: February 21, 1937 Mexico City, Mexico
- Died: May 11, 2020 (aged 83) Mexico City, Mexico
- Party: Institutional Revolutionary Party
- Spouse: Miguel de la Madrid (m. 1957; died 2012)
- Children: Margarita; Miguel; Enrique; Federico; Gerardo

Paloma Delia Margarita Cordero Tapia, known as Paloma Cordero, (February 21, 1937 – May 11, 2020) was the First Lady of Mexico from 1982 to 1988 during the presidency of her husband, Miguel de la Madrid. Cordero also headed the National System for Integral Family Development (DIF) during her tenure.

== Biography ==
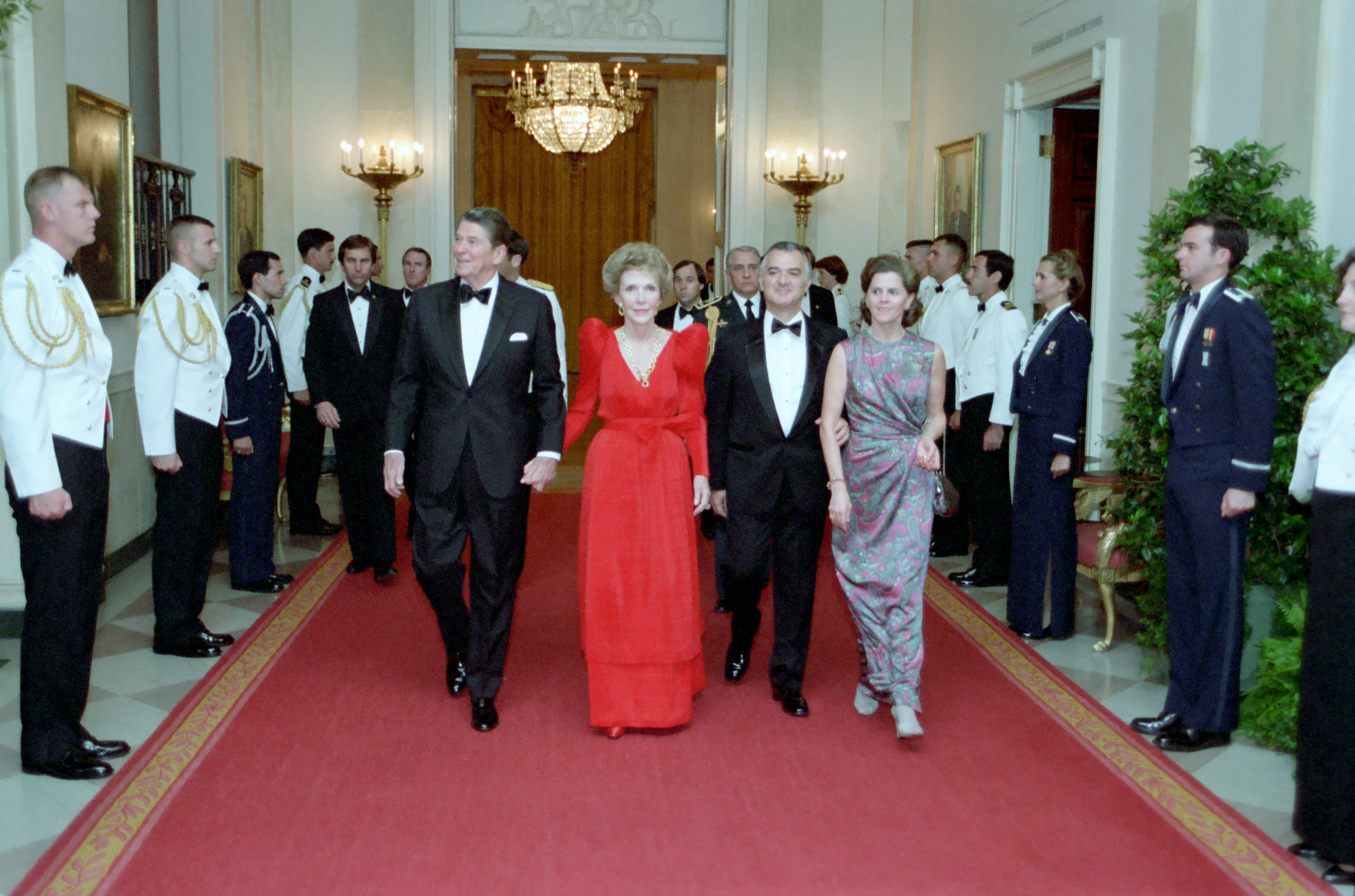
First Lady Paloma Cordero attending a state dinner at the White House in 1984.

Cordero was born in Mexico City on February 21, 1937. She was the daughter of Luis Cordero Bustamante, a lawyer, and Delia Tapia Labardini. Cordero was raised in the Colonia Hipódromo Condesa neighborhood of Mexico City.

In 1953, Cordero's older brother introduced her to Miguel de la Madrid. The couple began dating in 1955, when De La Madrid was a fourth year of law school. The couple married in 1959 in a Catholic ceremony at the Santa Rosa de Lima Church in Cuauhtémoc. Their marriage produced five children - Margarita, Miguel, Enrique Octavio, Federico Luis and Gerardo Antonio.

In addition to the normal protocols and tours expected of for the national first lady, Cordero also headed the National System for Integral Family Development (DIF), a public social service agency, and the National Volunteer Service organization. Under Cordero, the DIF expanded to include new programs offering drug rehabilitation, protection for abused minors, services for the blind and disabled, and aid to law enforcement. Cordero also oversaw the construction of new shelters, child development and recreational centers, and food processing facilities through DIF. New technical training programs were also added to DIF's outreach services.

Paloma Cordero died on May 11, 2020, at the age of 83. She was survived by her five children, Margarita, Miguel, Enrique Octavio, Federico Luis, Gerardo Antonio; and seven grandchildren: Luis Javier, Pablo, María, Isabel, Miguel, Fabiana and Amelia. Her husband, Miguel de la Madrid, died in 2012.
