= Alpura (company) =

Mexican dairy company

Ganaderos Productores de Leche Pura, S.A.P.I. de C.V.
- Trade name: Alpura
- Company type: Private
- Industry: Dairy
- Founded: 1973; 53 years ago
- Headquarters: Mexico City, Mexico
- Area served: Mexico and the United States
- Key people: François Bouyra (CEO)
- Products: Milk, cheese, butter, yogurt
- Number of employees: 5,000
- Website: www.alpura.com

Ganaderos Productores de Leche Pura, S.A.P.I. de C.V., commonly known as Alpura, is a Mexican dairy product company founded in 1973, based in Mexico City. Alpura products are sold in 27 states in Mexico and exported to the United States.

== History ==
Alpura was founded in 1973 by a group of dairy producers from various parts of Mexico. They created the Asociación Nacional de Productores de Leche Pura S.A. de C.V or Alpura with the goal of producing fresh milk across Mexico, the first company to do so. At the time, powdered milk was more affordable, and initially this posed as a challenge to Alpura.

Alpura has 254 shareholders, 142 farmers and 140,000 cows. They process 2 million liters of milk per day and offer more than 100 products. The company distributes milk to supermarkets in Mexico within 24 hours of milking. Alpura has 15 distribution centers and 60 distributors spaced throughout the country.

== Alpura Group ==
Alpura has over 142 ranch properties throughout Mexico.Their main properties are located in Chihuahua, Coahuila, Durango, Guanajuato, Hidalgo, Jalisco, Estado de México, Querétaro and Tlaxcala. In the Alpura group, there are 5,067 employees, around 4,350 farmers and 2,320 distributors. All the cows are of the Holstein breed. During the milking process, the cows and the milk are not touched by the workers.

== Products ==
The volume and diversity of Alpura's dairy portfolio have expanded since its inception. The company's introduction of ultra-high temperature processing was a transformative event for the Mexican dairy industry, as it established standardized industrial protocols for a market that previously lacked large-scale commercial business models and formalized production chains. The implementation of ultrapasteurization allowed for the elimination of pathogenic microorganisms, ensuring product stability and safety through industrial standards. Today, Alpura has five different dairy product categories, with numerous brands under each type. These include:

- Milk: available in pasteurized and UHT formats, categorized by lipid content (classic, semi-skimmed, and light). The line includes functional variants (extra light, lactose-free, and cholesterol-free), flavored milks, and specialized infant formulas (Alpura Kids).
- Cream: includes "Crema 2000" and various reduced-fat alternatives.
- Yogurt: the fermented dairy line consists of set and stirred yogurts, including probiotic, functional (Vivendi line), and fruit-infused varieties.
- Drinkable yogurt: mirroring the flavor profiles of the standard yogurt line, these are available in regular, probiotic, and functional formats.
- Dessert cups: dairy-based dessert cups, primarily featuring fruit-and-cream compositions.

== Awards and distinctions ==
Alpura received the “Mexico Supreme Quality Recognition” in 2009. This award is given to small, medium or large agro-food sector businesses with strong backgrounds in production, sale and distribution of food products which maintain the highest quality and also hold current certification.
