= Margarita López Portillo =

Mexican novelist

Margarita López Portillo y Pacheco
- Born: 1914; Guadalajara, Jalisco, Mexico
- Died: 9 May 2006 (aged 91–92); Mexico City, Mexico
- Occupations: Writer, screenwriter
- Years active: 1965–1985

Margarita López Portillo y Pacheco (Note: In this Mexican name, the surname is López Portillo and the second or maternal family name is Pacheco.) (1914–2006) was a Mexican novelist who earned several awards for her novels and also had three of them adapted for film. She was a public servant, serving under three presidents in various capacities of regulating media. During her brother José López Portillo's presidency (1976–1982), she received sharp criticism for his nepotism and failure to act on warnings of potential fire at the Cineteca Nacional, a government-run film repository. She studied the works of Sor Juana Inés de la Cruz and led an effort to restore the convent where Sor Juana had lived. In 1980, she was granted the French Order of Arts and Letters.

== Biography ==
Margarita López Portillo y Pacheco was born in 1914 in Guadalajara, Jalisco. Her family was one of intellectuals and military officers, as her grandfather José López Portillo y Rojas had been a writer, was a member of the Mexican Academy of Language and one-time governor of Jalisco. Her father, José López Portillo y Weber served as a cadet during the Ten Tragic Days in the service of President Francisco I. Madero. She graduated with a degree in letters from the National Autonomous University of Mexico (UNAM) and published her first book Los laureles in 1952. El Universal Gráfico awarded her the “Lanz Duret” Prize for her debut novel. In 1954, she was awarded the “Lanz Duret” Prize for her novel "Toña Machetes" and earned the Sor Juana Inés de la Cruz Prize in 1956 for her third novel, Tierra bronca.

In 1958, she joined a group of writers who worked under the direction of Fausto Vega and later under Agustín Yáñez. Members of the workshop included Guadalupe Amor, Carmen Andrade, Beatriz Castillo Ledón, Amparo Dávila, Guadalupe Dueñas, Amalia González Caballero de Castillo Ledón, Mercedes Manero de Gertz, Ángeles Mendieta Alatorre, Esther Ortuño de Aguiñaga, Cordelia Urueta and Margarita Urueta. She published pieces in numerous magazines, including Ábside, Mujeres and El Rehilete. In 1964, she began working at the Secretariat of the Interior for the Gustavo Díaz Ordaz regime as the supervisor of television productions and the Directorate General of Cinematography. In 1974, President Luis Echeverría appointed her as Director of the Museo Tecnológico de la CFE (Museum of Technology of the Federal Electricity Commission (CFE)) and Cultural Dissemination Advisor for Workers In 1975, she was made the Divisional Manager of the Federal Electricity Commission for Guadalajara and Jalisco.

In 1976, after her brother, José López Portillo, was elected president, but before he took office, Margarita was the victim of an attempted kidnapping by the Liga Comunista 23 de Septiembre, during which one of the leaders of the organization, David Jiménez Sarmiento, was killed. Upon assuming office, López Portillo made Margarita head of the General Directorate of Radio, Television and Cinematography (RTC), and she immediately reversed the policy of the previous administration. The previous policy had drastically reduced the number of films produced by denying credit to any private film producers, virtually requiring official participation in all filmmaking. However, while Margarita's policy increased production, it did not improve the quality of films being produced. She was also appointed head of the Mexican Social Security Institute during her brother's presidency from 1976 to 1982. She was resoundingly criticized for her management of the RTC and when the Cineteca Nacional burned and five people were killed in the fire of 24 March 1982, Margarita was blamed for not having heeded warnings of danger.

In the late 1970s, Margarita made a study of the works of Sor Juana Inés de la Cruz, writing two books and several articles about her works. She led an effort to restore the convent where Sor Juana had lived and served as Chairman of the Board of the committee for preservation of Sor Juana Inés de la Cruz. In 1980, she was awarded an honorary doctorate by the Autonomous University of the State of Mexico (UAEM) and the same year was granted the French Order of Arts and Letters. However, in 1995 a scandal erupted when it was discovered that Margarita had taken the famous medallion of Sor Juana to her own home, which was widely seen as yet another instance of abuse of power by Mexican political families. She was persuaded to return the Mexican national treasure, which is now on display in Congress.

She died on 9 May 2006.

== Selected works ==
=== Written works ===
- Los Laureles Mexico (1952)
- Toña Machetes Mexico: Bruguera Mexicana de Ediciones (1954)
- Tierra bronca Mexico: Botas (1956)
- Los días de la voz México: Porrúa (1975)
- Estampas de Juana Ines de la Cruz Lapéox México: Editora del Sureste (1978)
- Sor Juana México: Fomento Cultural Banamex (1979)
- Los Registros de bienes y la investigación histórica México: Instituto de Estudios y Documentos Históricos (1980)

=== Screenwriting ===
- Historical telenovela Maximiliano y Carlota (1965)
- Estampas de Sor Juana (1980)
- Toña Machetes (1985)
