= López Portillo (surname) =

López Portillo is a compound Spanish-language surname, comprising the names López and Portillo.

It is primarily associated with José López Portillo y Pacheco (1920–2004), a Mexican politician who served as president from 1976 to 1982.

Other notable persons with the surname include:

- Jesús López-Portillo y Serrano (1818–1901) Mexican lawyer and politician, governor of Jalisco on several occasions (great-grandfather of the president)
- José López Portillo y Rojas (1850–1923), Mexican lawyer and man of letters, governor of Jalisco in 1911 (grandfather of the president)
- José López Portillo y Weber (1889–1974), Mexican engineer and historian (father of the president)
- Margarita López Portillo y Pacheco (1914–2006), Mexican novelist and civil servant (sister of the president)
- Jorge Humberto López Portillo Basave (born 1974), Mexican politician (grandson of the president)

== See also ==
- es:Familia López-Portillo
