= Urueta =

Urueta is a surname. Notable people with the surname include:

- Carlos Adolfo Urueta (1873–1931), Colombian diplomat and politician
- Chano Urueta (1904–1979), Mexican film director, producer, screenwriter, and actor
- Cordelia Urueta (1908–1995), Mexican artist
- Fernando Francisco Gómez-Mont Urueta (born 1963), Mexican politician
- Leonor Urueta (born 1954), Mexican swimmer
- Luis Urueta (born 1981), Colombian baseball coach
- Margarita Urueta (1918–2004), Mexican writer
