= 6th federal electoral district of Jalisco =

Federal electoral district of Mexico

Jalisco's 6th
- Electoral district of the Chamber of Deputies of Mexico

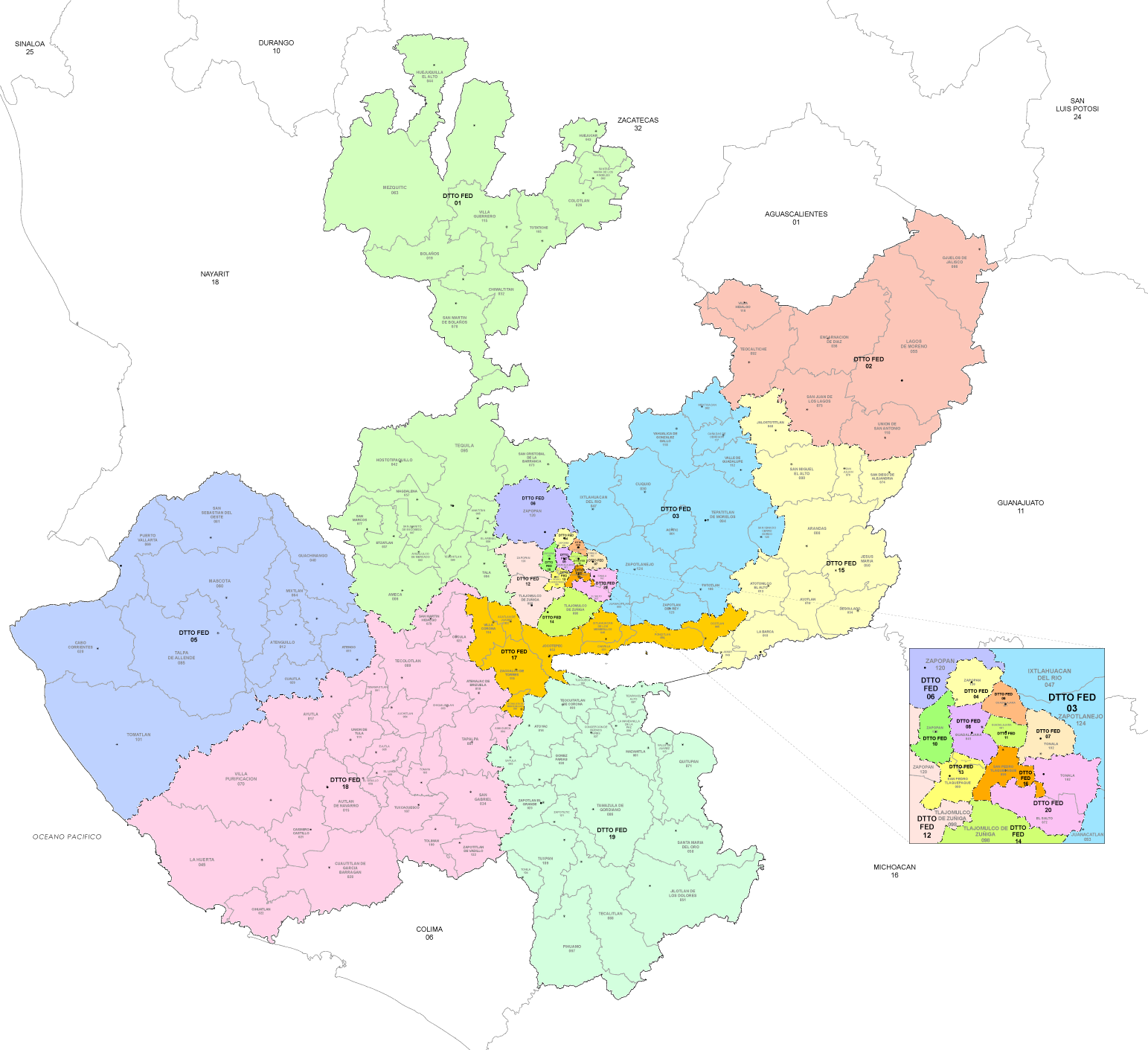
- 6th district

Incumbent
- Member: Beatriz Carranza Gómez
- Party: ▌Morena
- Congress: 66th (2024–2027)

District
- State: Jalisco
- Head town: Nuevo México, Zapopan
- Coordinates: 20°45′N 103°26′W
- Covers: Municipality of Zapopan (part)
- PR region: First
- Precincts: 134
- Population: 439,217 (2020 census)

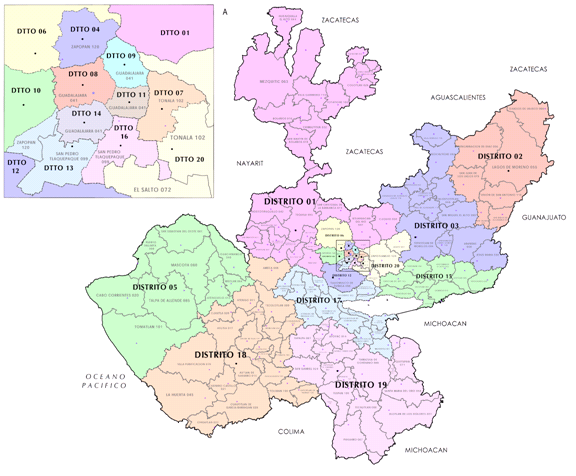
Jalisco's districts in 2017–2022

The 6th federal electoral district of Jalisco (Spanish: Distrito electoral federal 06 de Jalisco) is one of the 300 electoral districts into which Mexico is divided for elections to the federal Chamber of Deputies and one of 20 such districts in the state of Jalisco.

It elects one deputy to the lower house of Congress for each three-year legislative session by means of the first-past-the-post system. Votes cast in the district also count towards the calculation of proportional representation ("plurinominal") deputies elected from the first region.

The current member for the district, elected in the 2024 general election, is Beatriz Carranza Gómez of the National Regeneration Movement (Morena).

== District territory ==
Under the 2023 districting plan adopted by the National Electoral Institute (INE), which is to be used for the 2024, 2027 and 2030 federal elections, Jalisco's 6th district is located in the Guadalajara Metropolitan Area and comprises 134 electoral precincts (secciones electorales) across the north-western part of the municipality of Zapopan. (Note: The 4th, 10th and 12th districts cover the remainder of the municipality.)

The head town (cabecera distrital), where results from individual polling stations are gathered together and tallied, is the city of Nuevo México. The district reported a population of 439,217 in the 2020 census.

== Previous districting schemes ==
Evolution of electoral district numbers
	1974	1978	1996	2005	2017	2023
Jalisco	13	20	19	19	20	20
Chamber of Deputies	196	300				

2017–2022

Jalisco regained its 20th congressional seat in the 2017 redistricting process. The 6th district's head town was at Zapopan and it covered 165 precincts in that municipality.

2005–2017

Under the 2005 plan, Jalisco had 19 districts. This district's head town was at Zapopan and it covered 122 precincts in that municipality.

1996–2005

In the 1996 scheme, under which Jalisco lost a single-member seat, the district had its head town at Zapopan and it covered 119 precincts in that municipality.

1978–1996

The districting scheme in force from 1978 to 1996 was the result of the 1977 electoral reforms, which increased the number of single-member seats in the Chamber of Deputies from 196 to 300. Under that plan, Jalisco's seat allocation rose from 13 to 20. The 6th district's head town was at Lagos de Moreno and it covered eight municipalities in the north-east of the state:
- Encarnación de Díaz, Lagos de Moreno, Mexticacán, Ojuelos de Jalisco, San Juan de los Lagos, Teocaltiche, Unión de San Antonio and Villa Hidalgo.

== Deputies returned to Congress ==
(Mexico) National parties
- Current
- PAN
- PRI
- PT
- PVEM
- MC
- Morena
- PAZ
- Somos
- Defunct or local only
- PLM
- PNR
- PRM
- PNM
- PP
- PPS
- PARM
- PFCRN
- CON
- PANAL
- PSD
- PES
- PES
- PRD

Jalisco's 6th district
Election	Deputy	Party	Term	Legislature
1916	Bruno Moreno		1916–1917	Constituent Congress of Querétaro
...
1976	Rigoberto González Quezada	Institutional Revolutionary Party	1976–1979	50th Congress
1979	Juan Diego Castañeda Ceballos	Institutional Revolutionary Party	1979–1982	51st Congress
1982	Luis Garfías Magaña	Institutional Revolutionary Party	1982–1985	52nd Congress
1985	Jorge Sanromán Quiñones	Institutional Revolutionary Party	1985–1988	53rd Congress
1988	Julián Orozco González	Institutional Revolutionary Party	1988–1991	54th Congress
1991	Juan Alfonso Serrano González	Institutional Revolutionary Party	1991–1994	55th Congress
1994	Emma Muñoz Covarrubias	Institutional Revolutionary Party	1994–1997	56th Congress
1997	Felipe de Jesús Vicencio Álvarez	National Action Party (Mexico)	1997–2000	57th Congress
2000	Germán Arturo Pellegrini Pérez	National Action Party (Mexico)	2000–2003	58th Congress
2003	Gonzalo Moreno Arévalo	Institutional Revolutionary Party	2003–2006	59th Congress
2006	Joel Arellano Arellano	National Action Party (Mexico)	2006–2009	60th Congress
2009	Jorge Humberto López Portillo Basave	Institutional Revolutionary Party	2009–2012	61st Congress
2012	Abel Octavio Salgado Peña	Institutional Revolutionary Party	2012–2015	62nd Congress
2015	Mirza Flores Gómez	Citizens' Movement (Mexico)	2015–2018	63rd Congress
2018	Fabiola Raquel Loya Hernández	Citizens' Movement (Mexico)	2018–2021	64th Congress
2021	Manuel Jesús Herrera Vega	Citizens' Movement (Mexico)	2021–2024	65th Congress
2024	Beatriz Carranza Gómez	National Regeneration Movement	2024–2027	66th Congress

== Presidential elections ==
Jalisco's 6th district
Election	District won by	Party or coalition	%
2018	Andrés Manuel López Obrador	Juntos Haremos Historia	39.7812
2024	Bertha Xóchitl Gálvez Ruiz	Fuerza y Corazón por México	44.6076
