= List of Great Pretender episodes =

Great Pretender is a 2020 original anime television series produced by Wit Studio, directed by Hiro Kaburagi, written by Ryōta Kosawa, character designs by Yoshiyuki Sadamoto and music composed by Yutaka Yamada. Yamada also composes its theme song "G.P.", while its ending theme is a cover of the song "The Great Pretender" performed by Queen lead vocalist Freddie Mercury, originally recorded by The Platters.

The series' story is divided into blocks of episodes called "Cases". Case 1: Los Angeles Connection is episodes 1 through 5, Case 2: Singapore Sky is episodes 6 through 10, Case 3: Snow of London is episodes 11 through 14, and Case 4: Wizard of Far East is episodes 15 through 23. Case 1 began streaming on Netflix Japan on June 2, 2020, with Case 2 following on June 9. Case 3 began streaming on Netflix Japan on June 16, 2020, and Case 4 followed on September 21. Outside of Japan, Netflix released the first "season", comprising Cases 1–3, on August 20, 2020, and the remaining Case 4 on November 25, 2020. Great Pretender's first 14 episodes were released outside of Japan on Netflix on August 20, 2020, with the last 9 following on November 25.

The anime series aired on Fuji TV's +Ultra anime programming block and BS Fuji from July 8 to December 16, 2020.

== Episode list ==
=== Case 1: Los Angeles Connection ===
No.	Title	Directed by	Original release date (Note: The episodes were streamed in advance on Netflix in Japan with five episodes every week beginning on June 2, 2020.)
1	"CASE1_1: Los Angeles Connection"	Hiro Kaburagi; Yoshiyuki Shirahata	June 2, 2020 (Netflix Japan); July 8, 2020 (+Ultra)
Con artist Makoto Edamura successfully tricks a woman into buying an expensive water filtration system she really didn't need with help from his partner Kudou. Shortly afterwards, the two try to con the French con man Laurent Thierry, but end up getting conned by him instead. With law enforcement in pursuit, Makoto runs away and spots Laurent in a taxi. He hitches a ride with Laurent to Haneda Airport and then catches a flight to Los Angeles. Laurent takes Makoto to Beverly Hills to meet up with famed movie producer and secret drug kingpin Eddie Cassano at his Beverly Hills mansion, and is introduced to Laurent's partner Abigail "Abby" Jones. Abby, pretending to be a wannabe actress and hanger-on of Cassano's, is fed a drug in the form of a Japanese-style hard candy called Sakura Magic and feigns a drug-induced trance in order to convince Cassano to buy it from Laurent. Makoto then realizes that being brought to help with this con was Laurent's scheme the whole time, and that both Kudou and the woman he conned earlier were in on it. Not pleased with the way Laurent has been using him, Makoto tries to run away, but is captured due to the tracking device that Laurent secretly placed on him. He is knocked unconscious by Abigail and regains consciousness only to find himself hanging from the Hollywood Sign.
2	"CASE1_2: Los Angeles Connection"	Takashi Katagiri; Tetsuaki Matsuda	June 2, 2020 (Netflix Japan); July 15, 2020 (+Ultra)
Makoto recalls the events that led him to becoming a con man. Struggling to find work due to his father's criminal past, he got a job as a salesman for Kudou's company to support his ailing mother Miki Edamura, only to find that the company has been engaging in consumer fraud without his knowledge. The police did not believe he didn't know about the scam, and Makoto was sent to prison. After being released on parole, Makoto's criminal record prevented him from getting a new job, and his mother passed away. With no other way to making a living, Makoto approaches Kudou offering to partner with him and become Japan's greatest con man. In the present, after Laurent and Abigail cut Makoto down from the Hollywood sign, Laurent explains his intention to scout him with help of an associate and that Sakura Magic is fake and he is using its rumored existence to scam Cassano. That night, Laurent meets with Cassano and makes a deal to sell a huge batch of Sakura Magic to him. Not pleased with his role in this scheme, Makoto walks out and reflects while holding a gashapon figure of Toyotomi Hideyoshi, who he considers to be the greatest con man in history, after being harshly criticized by Abby. Two days later, Makoto greets Laurent and Abby at Cassano's mansion with a renewed sense of confidence, having persuaded Cassano to buy Sakura Magic at double the price Laurent offered.
3	"CASE1_3: Los Angeles Connection"	Tomoko Hiramuki; Tetsuaki Matsuda	June 2, 2020 (Netflix Japan); July 22, 2020 (+Ultra)
After walking out, Makoto rented and watched Razzie Rising, a movie directed by Cassano. The next morning, he was prepared to return to Japan, but at the airport he was captured by Salazar, a former gang boss now in Cassano's employ. With Makoto forced to stay until the deal is complete, he decided to pretend that he created Sakura Magic, offering to sell Cassano a fake formula for the drug for a much higher price. After Laurent and Abby arrive, Cassano asks for proof of Makoto's credentials, which they fake by having Kudou's company act as doctors at the pharmaceutical research center where Laurent claimed that Makoto worked. That night, Cassano discusses an alternative location for the deal knowing that LAPD detective Anderson has been hot on his trail. On the way there, a car chase between Cassano's car, driven by Salazar, and Anderson ensues, but they manage to shake Anderson off. Cassano reveals that he is bribing Anderson, and the chase was staged to keep the LAPD from becoming suspicious. Everybody arrives at the trade location, an abandoned cider brewery now used to prepare drugs. Cassano orders Makoto to make Sakura Magic himself, and when Makoto claims that conditions are not ideal for making the drug, Cassano offers to renovate it. Cassano sends Makoto to stay at Salazar's house until the new lab is complete, separating him from Laurent and Abby. FBI agent Paula Dickins arrives and assumes command of Anderson's unit in order to apprehend both Cassano's drug network and Laurent's gang.
4	"CASE1_4: Los Angeles Connection"	Ryōji Masuyama	June 2, 2020 (Netflix Japan); July 29, 2020 (+Ultra)
Makoto has a dream of his childhood when he looked up to his father, lawyer Seiji Ozaki. With Makoto under Salazar's watch at all times and a week remaining until the lab is ready, Abby sneaks in at night so Makoto can take lessons from Laurent and a drug cook via videoconferencing and construct a plausible fake version of Sakura Magic to fool Cassano. The next day Makoto goes sightseeing with Salazar, visiting Grauman's Chinese Theater and attending a baseball game at Dodger Stadium, and finds out that Salazar has a son named Tom, living in foster care after the death of Salazar's wife, who he is missing a visit with because of Cassano's command that he entertain Makoto. At Makoto's behest, they pick Tom up and take him to a theme park so he can spend the day with his father. While using the restroom, Makoto is approached by Paula and Anderson. Paula tells him that she is well aware of the scheme and coerces him into acting as a mole to aid an FBI sting operation to arrest Laurent and Cassano, in exchange for which they will clear Makoto of wrongdoing and return him to Japan. Makoto discovers a hidden camera in his bedroom at Salazar's home, meaning his contact with Abby and Laurent has been found out. The next day, everybody convenes at Cassano's mansion for a party, unaware that there is a traitor among them, but to Makoto's relief, Cassano accuses his financial manager. Makoto confronts Salazar about the camera and asks him why he didn't expose him to Cassano, and Salazar explains that he became a gang lord and later Cassano's bodyguard out of a desire to rise above his poor upbringing and give his son a better life. This reminds Makoto of his own father's arrest on suspicion of aiding a human trafficking ring, prompting him to agree to cooperate with Paula and the FBI on the condition that they let Salazar go free.
5	"CASE1_5: Los Angeles Connection"	Yoshiyuki Shirahata; Yukiko Imai	June 2, 2020 (Netflix Japan); August 5, 2020 (+Ultra)
With the laboratory ready, Makoto goes through the motions of making Sakura Magic while wearing the glasses with the FBI bug, despite Paula's earlier refusal to absolve Salazar of blame. Upon completion, a SWAT team commanded by Paula breaks into the laboratory. Abby steals a gun and aims at an officer and is shot down, along with Laurent when he tries to protect her. Distraught, Makoto attacks Paula and holds her at gunpoint, threatening to shoot her if the FBI and LAPD don't open a path out for him and Salazar. In the confusion, Cassano blows up the lab. Cassano attempts to escape, but Makoto chases after him, and Cassano viciously beats him before Salazar arrives and saves Makoto by punching him out. The three are taken to the FBI's surveillance trailer, but rather than arrest Cassano, Paula agrees to free him and destroy evidence of his involvement for a bribe of $100 million. Makoto is furious, but is knocked unconscious by an unseen assailant. Makoto awakens later on an island, where Laurent and Abby greet him and Paula reveals her true identity as Cynthia Moore, part of Laurent's gang. At Cynthia's villa, where Laurent's gang are celebrating the success of their scam and Cassano's downfall, Laurent explains that everything was staged; the FBI officers were all part of his crew, and their weapons were just props. He and Abby faked their deaths to convince the LAPD to overlook them and focus only on Cassano. He also tells Makoto that Salazar has given up on being a gangster to focus on being a father, aided by a reward from the FBI he obtained for turning Cassano in. After the party, Makoto returns to Japan to turn himself in and use his share of the profits to compensate the victims he helped Kudou scam. Cassano is arrested and interrogated by the real Paula Dickins.

=== Case 2: Singapore Sky ===
No.	Title	Directed by	Original release date
6	"CASE2_1: Singapore Sky"	Takaaki Suzuki	June 9, 2020 (Netflix Japan); August 12, 2020 (+Ultra)
Makoto spends the next two years in prison, training as a mechanic. On his release, he begins his new life working as a car mechanic at Nakanoshima Heavy Industries. The owner Shougo Nakanoshima shows Makoto his propeller airplane and teaches him how to maintain it. Meanwhile Danny, an arrogant manager, fires Chris, an employee he had sexually harassed. Danny flies to Las Vegas where he meets Cynthia, who asks him to place bets for her on Abby at an underground boxing club with fixed matches. However it is a scam and Danny loses all his money when Abby throws a match, and Cynthia later delivers his money to Chris. Sometime later, Laurent's gang approaches Makoto and reveals they have formed an air racing team as part of their next con and had him trained as a mechanic for that purpose. Makoto grudgingly joins them and Abby takes Makoto on a test flight in the plane he worked on. The plane explodes in midair due to the effects of a chemical capsule Laurent had planted in the oil tank, but they parachute to safety.
7	"CASE2_2: Singapore Sky"	Takashi Katagiri; Yukiko Imai	June 9, 2020 (Netflix Japan); August 19, 2020 (+Ultra)
In Singapore Laurent explains to Makoto that the targets of his scam are the brothers Clark and Sam Ibrahim who fled their Middle-Eastern country amidst scandal and now run the Pathfinder Air Race. Sam is the promoter who is rigging the tournament by paying off competitors to lose to his pilot brother Clark. He is also sabotaging the planes of other pilots who do not cooperate such as Lewis Muller who crashed and was badly injured in the Australian race. Abby is the pilot for Cynthia's "Team Confidence" and she qualifies, but nearly passes out after spotting a couple who resemble her parents in the crowd. That night, Cynthia, convinces Sam to rig the tournament final to have Abby race Clark after Makoto spams social media to popularize the first female pilot/owner team in the event's history. The next day, Abby has her first match against Toto Vialli who is supposed to lose, but as she falls behind, she hears Sam's voice through a hidden microphone denigrating women. Abby's memories of the loss of her parents and her time as a child soldier affect her performance, but Makoto's yelling in her earpiece brings her back to the race in time for her to beat Vialli.
8	"CASE2_3: Singapore Sky"	Yoshiyuki Shirahata	June 9, 2020 (Netflix Japan); August 26, 2020 (+Ultra)
Makoto takes Abby for a ride on the Singapore Flyer and tries to get to know her better, but she refuses to acknowledge him as a partner while Laurent's gang sets up an underground casino at the Marina Bay Sands. Cynthia tries again to seduce Sam again but is rebuffed, so Laurent enacts his backup plan to have Makoto infiltrate Clark's maintenance crew. Laurent convinces Lewis's wife, Isabelle, to vouch for Makoto as a mechanic after Clark's mechanic, Kevin, leaves the team after being told that his London home caught fire. The next day, Makoto offers to join Clark's mechanic team, claiming he can improve his plane's performance. Sam is skeptical and puts him to the test, but a group of planted onlookers praise Clark's improved flying. Later, Shi Won appears, posing as Lewis's former patron, and she tells Sam that Makoto was in on a scheme involving an underground casino and was the one responsible for Lewis's accident. Sam is keen to visit the underground casino, so Makoto takes Sam who assumes the false identity of a Turkish restaurant owner called Mike Portnoy.
9	"CASE2_4: Singapore Sky"	Tetsuaki Matsuda	June 9, 2020 (Netflix Japan); September 2, 2020 (+Ultra)
Sam places a bet of S$300,000 on Abby at Laurent's casino, and she wins. That night, Abby researches information about Lewis online and recalls the day she won the medal in a ballet recital, only to be caught in the bombing of Baghdad as she and her parents walked home. The next day, Sam bets S$1 million on Abby and wins, but Laurent bans him from the casino for gambling under a false identity. Makoto proposes that he place bets on Sam's behalf. Sam agrees and instructs Makoto to bet S$2.5 million on Caio Bisconti. However, before the race, Cynthia visits Caio's hangar and distracts him and his crew while Abby secretly drops a tiny capsule into his plane's fuel tank. The capsule dissolves and releases chemicals which cause the plane's engine to malfunction, forcing Caio to make an emergency water landing and Sam to lose his money. That night, Abby takes Lewis to the Gardens by the Bay, where she demands to know whether or not he was part of the 2003 bombing of Baghdad while secretly holding a knife in her hand.
10	"CASE2_5: Singapore Sky"	Katsushi Sakurabi	June 9, 2020 (Netflix Japan); September 9, 2020 (+Ultra)
Lewis admits that he bombed Baghdad and Abby attacks him, but Makoto intervenes and stops her. On the night before the finals between Abby and Clark, Makoto suggests that Sam apologize in person to Laurent in an effort to recover the money he lost on the last race. Sam is allowed back into the casino and bets everything he has on Clark. That night, Makoto visits Clark to convince him to race for real, and Clark reveals that he and Lewis agreed to genuinely race each other in Australia, defying Sam's orders, and he blames himself for Lewis' injuries. On the day of the finals, Makoto and Abby arrange for Lewis to pilot Abby's plane in the race against Clark. Clark realizes from the other plane's maneuvers that he is racing Lewis and he just edges out Lewis to win the tournament. However, Sam is fooled into believing that Abby won by seeing doctored footage in the casino showing Abby's plane winning. After Sam finds out that he was duped into losing all his money, he returns to the casino only to discover that it has gone.

=== Case 3: Snow of London ===
No.	Title	Directed by	Original release date
11	"CASE3_1: Snow of London"	Yasuhiro Akamatsu	June 16, 2020 (Netflix Japan); September 16, 2020 (+Ultra)
Makoto is living in Nice, working at a Japanese restaurant which is run by a Chinese chef who thinks that Makoto is Korean. Makoto argues with the chef over the way he makes sushi which is even criticized by a fussy, wealthy customer. Later, Makoto, Laurent, and Cynthia dine at Makoto's boarding house restaurant, and Cynthia notices a painting which resembles work by the legendary painter Sergio Montoya. (Note: This is a reference to the Mexican artist Gustavo Montoya who is best known for his paintings of children and street scenes.) The owner Sebastian and his daughter Marie inform Makoto that their business is in debt and will close soon, so Makoto offers to buy the painting for €20,000. Makoto arranges for Cynthia and Abby to display the painting in a gallery and sell it to the fussy customer from before while Kudo distracts the staff. When Cynthia recognizes that the client is James Coleman, the world renowned art appraiser, she tells Makoto to abort the operation; however, James has already purchased the painting for €25,000. Makoto gives the money to Sebastian and Marie, but when Sebastian turns on the TV, a news report reveals that the painting is actually an authentic work by Montoya called "Snow of London" valued at €20 million. Later, after consuming too much wine, Cynthia decides to steal the painting back from Coleman.
12	"CASE3_2: Snow of London"	Yukiko Imai	June 16, 2020 (Netflix Japan); September 23, 2020 (+Ultra)
The operation begins with Laurent's gang attending an art auction in London where James is the auctioneer. Later, they set up listening devices at the estate of Farrah Brown, who is James' business partner and lover. She is the wealthy CEO of a fashion company and they learn that James has convinced her to buy any painting he desires without question. Meanwhile, Cynthia recalls the time when she first met Thomas Mayer, an aspiring artist who admired Montoya. She became his model and they later fell in love. At the next auction, the Snow of London painting goes up for bidding, and Laurent buys it for £30 million after Farrah's concerned butler, Tim, stops her from bidding any higher. Angered by Farrah's inability to buy the painting, James hires Abby who had been seeking to work for him as an assistant. Cynthia explains that the next step is to have a replica of the Snow of London painted by Thomas, who had talent for copying famous paintings, then sell the forgery to Farrah.
13	"CASE3_3: Snow of London"	Mai Tejima	June 16, 2020 (Netflix Japan); September 30, 2020 (+Ultra)
Makoto finds Thomas and learns that he has a £2 million debt. Cynthia recalls the time when Thomas was discovered by James who hired him to make replicas of lost famous paintings which James could sell as being authentic. This practice earned James the nickname 007 of the art world as a tracker of lost artworks. James' scheme provided Thomas with a new studio and a well-paying job, but it ended the romantic relationship between the two young lovers. Makoto arranges for Thomas to meet Cynthia at the restaurant where the two last met years earlier, and she asks Thomas to make a forgery of the Snow of London in exchange for paying off his debts. Meanwhile, Abby tells James that Laurent is an underground art dealer who sources paintings for the mafia and convinces him to attend a private event where the Snow of London is being auctioned. Later, Makoto discovers that Thomas got into debt by borrowing money to buy back his forgeries to keep them out of the public eye. The next day, Makoto presents Thomas with the real Snow of London and asks him to create a forgery. Thomas completes the copy several days later.
14	"CASE3_4: Snow of London"	Yūko Kanamori	June 16, 2020 (Netflix Japan); October 7, 2020 (+Ultra)
With the Snow of London replica finished, Cynthia pays off Thomas's debt. Meanwhile, Farrah arranges for Tim to sell many of her assets to raise £50 million to buy the painting. The private auction begins the next day, stacked with Laurent's associates. During a break, Abby and Tim take Farrah aside and convince her of James' true exploitative nature. The auction resumes with the Snow of London up for bidding and Abby informs James that Farrah is feeling ill but will pay up to £70 million. Cynthia sits in Farrah's seat and aggressively bids against James, forcing him to buy the painting with £100 million of his own money. Later, Farrah cuts her ties with James, and on Tim's advice she opens a public exhibition to display the paintings she bought at James' request. Laurent's gang returns to Nice to return the painting, but Marie realizes that it is not the original. Makoto apologizes for giving James the real painting, but Marie says she prefers the replica because of the effort that went into it. Cynthia returns to London and has one last meeting with Thomas while Makoto returns to the restaurant hoping to get his job back, only to find out the owner has now hired Thai staff.

=== Case 4: Wizard of Far East ===
No.	Title	Directed by	Original release date
15	"CASE4_1: Wizard of Far East"	Ryouji Masuyama	September 21, 2020 (Netflix Japan); October 21, 2020 (+Ultra)
On the anniversary of his mother Miki's death, Makoto visits her grave and reflects on his adventures with Laurent's gang. Later at Cynthia's villa, Makoto tells Laurent and his gang that he is quitting them. He returns to Japan to restart his life and finds a job working for the Scarlet trading company. After carrying out some international transporting jobs, Makoto's boss Ishigami takes him to Roppongi to meet Akemi Suzaku, CEO of their parent company the Suzaku Group, and she gives him her approval. Makoto travels to Vietnam with Ishigami and finds himself taking part in a human trafficking operation. They take some orphaned children from a farming village and auction them, much to Makoto's disgust. Suspecting that he was set up by Laurent again, an angry Makoto calls Laurent who confirms that he knew about the Scarlet Company and the mafia known as the Suzaku Group which makes their money from human trafficking. Laurent and Abby travel to the United Arab Emirates to meet Clark Ibrahim, who has cut ties with his brother, and offer to sponsor his flying team in exchange for participating in the gang's next confidence operation.
16	"CASE4_2: Wizard of Far East"	Yoshiyuki Shirahata	September 21, 2020 (Netflix Japan); October 28, 2020 (+Ultra)
At the Suzaku holding facility, Makoto is tasked with cooking meals for the smuggled children. Cynthia and Si-Won travel to Japan and present themselves to Ishigami as representatives of a trading company claiming that they can deliver an Arab princess. Ishigami agrees, and the four travel to the UAE where Laurent's gang performs a scripted kidnapping with Clark posing as the prince and Abby posing as the princess. They return to Japan to present Abby to Suzaku, and after asking Abby to strip, Suzaku offers ¥100 million. Cynthia rejects the offer and threatens to sell her in Shanghai to force Suzaku to raise her offer to ¥1 billion. That night, Makoto is greeted by Laurent at his home, telling him that the operation is over as soon as he helps Abby escape. Makoto frees Abby using a duplicate key, but he decides to also release the ten children being held there. However, the children refuse to leave because they have no place to go or return to. With the security guard returning, Laurent aborts the operation and Abby returns to her confinement room.
17	"CASE4_3: Wizard of Far East"	Hiro Kaburaki	September 21, 2020 (Netflix Japan); November 4, 2020 (+Ultra)
Makoto recalls the time in his childhood when his mother taught him Confucianism and his father Ozaki was jailed for aiding the Suzaku Group with human trafficking. He never returned home after his release from prison and Makoto cared for his mother until she died. Back in the present, Makoto is summoned by Suzaku and ordered to serve as an interpreter for the visitors from Shanghai Longhu-bang, a Chinese mafia group led by Liu Xiao which started as a subsidiary of Suzaku Group. The visitors are Chen Yao, Liu's right-hand man, and Oz, who does the interpreting instead of Makoto. Chen is angered when Suzaku makes outrageous demands and leaves frustrated. Makoto then asks Ishigami about the interpreter and he finds out that Oz is actually his father. Makoto finds Laurent and punches him, angry that he set him up to see Ozaki against his wishes. Makoto then tracks Ozaki to his hotel room to confront him about leaving his family, and he apologizes. Makoto convinces him to help free Abby and the smuggled children. At the appointed time, Makoto and Ozaki free Abby and the children and into a van driven by Cynthia. Following Ozaki's suggestion to leave the highway, they are cornered by Ishigami's group. Ozaki reveals that he tipped off Ishigami about Makoto's escape plan and he still works for the Suzaku Group.
18	"CASE4_4: Wizard of Far East"	Yukiko Imai	September 21, 2020 (Netflix Japan); November 11, 2020 (+Ultra)
Makoto, Abby, and Cynthia are held captive on Suzaku's private yacht in Sagami Bay. Makoto is asked to prove his loyalty by shooting Abby and Cynthia, but Ozaki shoots them instead and they fall overboard. Suzaku then allows Makoto to take the gun and shoot Ozaki who also falls overboard. For the next three days, Makoto refuses to eat until Suzaku shows him kindness and he realizes that she is the only person left he can turn to. Two months later, Suzaku asks Makoto to run an auction of trafficked children because of his previous experience. Makoto successfully runs the auction resulting in a huge increase in revenue and Suzaku makes him the permanent auctioneer. Later, Ishigami tells Makoto that he must protect Suzaku from the Shanghai mafia. Meanwhile in Shanghai, Liu tells Chen the importance of a translator and how they are vulnerable with Ozaki gone, just as Laurent arrives seeking an audience with Liu. Makoto returns home and is surprised to see Ozaki still alive. Ozaki then tells his story of Laurent, starting from his childhood being raised in Brussels by his dyslexic mother Emma Thierry, who was cheated out of her life's savings by a shady investor named Hugo. Shortly thereafter, Emma passed away, leading Laurent to live a life of gambling in Paris. One night, he tried to kill Hugo, but he accidentally stabbed a woman named Dorothy instead.
19	"CASE4_5: Wizard of Far East"	Yujiro Abe	September 21, 2020 (Netflix Japan); November 18, 2020 (+Ultra)
Ozaki continues his story about Laurent. Following Dorothy's stabbing, Laurent fled and was picked up by Si-Won who took him to see Dorothy, who had survived and revealed that it was part of their scam. She revealed that she, Si-Won and Ozaki were con artists and Hugo was their target. Laurent was offered a place in the team because of his gambling and multilingual skills, and together they carried out successful confidence scams in places like São Paulo, Milan, and Sydney. Laurent fell in love with Dorothy and took her to Finland to see the northern lights where they became engaged. The gang decides to disband after one last confidence trick, targeting the human trafficking organization Shanghai Longhu-bang run by Liu Xiao. Laurent won Liu's trust by beating him in mahjong and he was hired to be Liu's interpreter. Laurent introduced Liu to Si-Won, who told him about a valuable princess of the former Ethiopian Empire that fled the civil unrest and was now living in Kyoto as a college student, who was played by Dorothy.
20	"CASE4_6: Wizard of Far East"	Mai Teshima	September 21, 2020 (Netflix Japan); November 25, 2020 (+Ultra)
The next part of Ozaki's scheme involved Si-Won showing pictures of Dorothy to Liu, passing her off as a princess of the Ethiopian dynasty. He agreed to buy her for $10 million after Si-Won threatened to sell her to Suzaku instead. The gang then "kidnapped" Dorothy in Kyoto and took her to Liu, planning to break her out the next day. Ozaki returned to Tokyo and Si-Won to Seoul. However, on the next day Laurent learned that the real descendants of the Ethiopian dynasty were coming to Shanghai, which threatened the operation if Liu realized that Dorothy was not the princess. Laurent told Ozaki and Si-Won to flee, and he frantically rushed to save Dorothy. However, Chen took her onto Liu's private yacht where Ozaki told Liu the location of the money, but Liu had Dorothy shot and killed anyway in front of Laurent. With Dorothy gone, Laurent had only the ring she wore around her neck, and he fell into a deep depression. However, Si-Won returned to France and rekindled his interest in life. A few years later Laurent encountered Cynthia in London who tried to scam him. Impressed by her skills, he decided to form a new gang with Cynthia, Si-Won and Ozaki. He then recruited Abby in Brooklyn for her fighting abilities. After serving his prison sentence, Ozaki became Liu's new interpreter, while also arranging for his friend Kudou to coach Makoto in con artist skills.
21	"CASE4_7: Wizard of Far East"	Yōko Kanemori	September 21, 2020 (Netflix Japan); December 2, 2020 (+Ultra)
Back in the present, Abby, Cynthia and Ozaki are revealed to be alive and were not killed on Suzaku's yacht. Ozaki's gun was loaded with paint bullets, and after they were shot and fell into the water, Si-Won took them to Laurent's yacht anchored some distance away, although Makoto was unaware of the subterfuge. Liu asks Laurent to become his translator for the upcoming Shanghai Longhu-bang negotiation with Suzaku. Meanwhile, Ozaki explains to Makoto that he refused to see him or Miki in order to protect them from Shanghai Longhu-bang, but Makoto mistrusted his father's motives. Suzaku and Liu have their video conference meeting with Laurent falsely translating to Liu that Suzaku wants him to transfer 67% of Shanghai Trading's ownership to her along with ¥100 billion for compensation, while Makoto falsely tells Suzaku that Liu mistrusts her and will only sell his company for ¥100 billion, further fueling tensions between the two groups. In preparing for Liu's visit to Tokyo, Ishigami has a new chair prepared for Suzaku with a sword hidden in the armrest, while Chen gives Liu a ring with a hidden poisonous needle. At the same time, the rest of Laurent's gang spends a night at a hot springs resort in Hakone where Ozaki reveals that the plan is to have Suzaku and Liu kill each other at the upcoming meeting.
22	"CASE4_8: Wizard of Far East"	Takashi Katagiri; Ryouji Masuyama	September 21, 2020 (Netflix Japan); December 9, 2020 (+Ultra)
On the day of the transaction, the meeting is arranged late at night at the Suzaku Group headquarters. Laurent escorts Liu and Chen to meet Suzaku in her office, accompanied by Ishigami and Makoto. Liu presents a briefcase filled with stock certificates while Suzaku presents a check for ¥100 billion. After prolonged silence by Makoto and Laurent, Laurent's gang, posing as a SWAT team led by Kudou, storm the office and "confiscate" the check and briefcase as evidence. During the stand-off, Laurent swipes Liu's poisoned ring and stabs him with it. Suzaku suspects the raid was staged due to the convenient timing, and when Kudou tries to arrest Suzaku, Makoto responds by taking the hidden sword to defend her. Suddenly, Makoto calls in Cassano and his gang and exposes Laurent's gang. Makoto explains that his ploy was to humiliate Laurent for exploiting him, and exact revenge on Ozaki for abandoning him and his mother. He threatens Ozaki with the sword, but Ozaki takes it and slashes Makoto, prompting Laurent's gang to start firing. Fearing for their lives, Suzaku, Ishigami, Liu, and Chen evacuate the office with their assistants. When the gunfire stops, they return to the office to find it abandoned. Suzaku sees a lever and pulls it, causing the office to lower to the ground floor where they find out that they were actually in a fake building on a remote island. As they walk away, the replica building collapses.
23	"CASE4_9: Wizard of Far East"	Hiro Kaburaki	September 21, 2020 (Netflix Japan); December 16, 2020 (+Ultra)
A few days after the fateful Suzaku Group meeting Suzaku, Liu, Chen, and Ishigami adjust to life abandoned on the remote island. On the morning of the transaction, Makoto dreamed of the time he gave his mother a gashapon figure of a wizard and she hoped that it meant that she would meet Ozaki again soon. The details of the Far East operation are explained. Makoto drugged Suzaku and Ishigami while Laurent did the same with Liu and Chen, enabling them to be unknowingly flown to the island. Laurent's gang created a replica of the headquarters, while Laurent secretly replaced the poison needle inside Liu's ring with an ordinary one. After the targets evacuated the office, the gang wildly fired their guns as a diversion to make their escape with the check and briefcase. Makoto was wearing a bag of fake blood underneath his blazer which only Laurent noticed. Cassano, Sam, and James are shown to have helped out. The gang parties away, and at sunrise, Laurent throws Dorothy's ring into the sea having avenged her. A few weeks later, Ozaki visits his wife's grave for the first time, while Si-Won advises Kudou to forget about his daughter who is in his ex-wife's custody. Cynthia raises one of the smuggled children, Kawin, and helps him decide on his future, while Abby goes rock climbing at Red Rock Canyon to take a selfie which she sends to Makoto, who plans to travel around the world to taste new kinds of coffee. Meanwhile, Laurent prepares to con his next target, the newly elected President of the United States. In the epilogue, Dorothy is revealed to be alive, living with amnesia on an island near Taiwan under the name Xiang-Xiang. Her caretakers find the ring inside the stomach of a fish they caught, and Dorothy puts it on her finger.

=== Intermission: Taipei Rendezvous ===
No.	Title	Directed by	Original release date
24	"INTERMISSION 1-1: Taipei Rendezvous"	Unknown	February 23, 2024 (DMM TV)
Dorothy, now living in Taipei as Li Xiang-Xiang, has a dream recalling the time she was sent drowning after being shot by Liu ten years ago. After waking up, she makes a visit to her adopted parents' home to see her mother Li Xian-Lin and visit her late father's grave. She gets a visit from the self-proclaimed genius grifter Yang K'un I (Ayi), claiming to be from a travel agency, but Dorothy foils his scam. Dorothy takes a photo of Ayi, threatening to report him to the police if he does this again. After returning to Taipei, Ayi has dinner with Chiang Pin Chueh (Jay) to report on Dorothy, and Jay's younger brother Lin drops by asking about Jay's weakness, his tofu allergy. The next day, Dorothy and Jay meet at a hotel with Jay offering to compensate her for Ayi's scam, but she refuses the money. Afterwards, the two go on a date and spend a night at the hotel. The next morning, having drunk too much last night, Dorothy has a hangover, while Jay reports to Lin that he thinks he has found the real Dorothy. As Jay finishes taking a bath, Dorothy comes in and Jay slips, hitting his head on the bathtub that sends him to the hospital. Meanwhile, Ayi meets up with Makoto after being instructed by Abby to meet him and give him a guided tour. The two head to the Shilin Night Market, where Dorothy and Jay are, and being unaware that he is allergic to tofu due to his brain damage, Jay eats the tofu and has a rash breakout. Jay heads to the restroom to cool the rash, while Ayi sees Jay there and chases after him, telling Makoto that the guided tour will have to wait.
25	"INTERMISSION 1-2: Taipei Rendezvous"	Unknown	February 23, 2024 (DMM TV)
Lin reports to Tsai, his uncle and drug dealer, regarding what he found about Li Xiang-Xiang noticing that there is no information about her prior to being adopted ten years ago. Dorothy brings Jay to her apartment to be treated for his rashes, while Ayi follows Jay to the complex. A couple of hitmen under Lin's orders break into the apartment to bring Jay back, but Ayi triggers the fire alarm to give Dorothy and Jay an opportunity to flee where they meet up with Ayi, and they decide to stay at Ayi's apartment for now. Meanwhile, Wang Yiqi, the leader of an underground drug-dealing syndicate, as well as Jay's and Lin's adopted father, meets a lawyer from a Singapore government-linked company in Kaohsiung to secure a stable revenue stream. At Ayi's apartment, Jay explains that for helping Dorothy, who conned the syndicate years ago, that he is being targeted. The three decide to leave Taiwan, but Jay needs to get his passport. Jay enters the apartment where two of Wang's hitmen live and creates a distraction to draw them to the roof, while Ayi comes into the apartment to look for it. Jay uses his belt to create a makeshift zip line, but it collapses. Jay falls into a tree to survive the fall, while Ayi finds the passport. The next day, Ayi puts Jay's passport in a locker and afterwards get on a commuter train for Taoyuan International Airport, where Dorothy gives Ayi the watch as instructed by Jay, but Ayi refuses it. At the airport, Ayi is told leave Taiwan without Jay. Shortly afterwards, Jay retrieves his passport, but is captured by Lin. Ayi recalls the time ten years ago when he was recruited into the syndicate as during a skirmish in the slums, Jay was stabbed.
26	"INTERMISSION 1-3: Taipei Rendezvous"	Unknown	February 23, 2024 (DMM TV)
Dorothy and Ayi leave Taipei for Osaka, and it is revealed that Ayi told Lin where Jay was. After arriving at Kansai International Airport, Dorothy tells Ayi that she decided to go to Osaka because her dream led her to nearby Kyoto, where she went to college and posed as an Ethiopian princess, and the two spend the night sleeping at the airport. Meanwhile, Lin brings Jay to meet up with Tsai and Wang's secretary Bingyan at a hotel in the Zhongshan District. Tsai privately tells Jay that Dorothy is a con artist who has history with Wang. The next morning, Ayi gets a call he does not answer fearing that his location will get traced, while Dorothy gets pickpocketed by a young African-Japanese man, losing the watch and Ayi's smartphone. Meanwhile, Tsai shows Lin a photo showing Laurent and Dorothy conning Wang to convince Lin that Dorothy is that con artist. Dorothy and Ayi head to Kyoto to go sightseeing, and then to Kyoto University where she meets that pickpocketer again, who brings her to an Ethiopian restaurant that used to be a boarding house where Dorothy, going under the name Diarra, stayed while attending school at Kyoto University. Meanwhile, Wang forcefully feeds Tsai a lethal drug that kills him as punishment for letting Jay escape, and leaves Ozaki to clean up the mess. Jay and Lin meet as Lin informs Jay about Tsai's death. Lin attempts to constrain Jay by feeding him a tofu and stunning him, but Jay constrains Lin instead by vomiting on him and tying him up, with Jay confiscating his passport. The next day, Jay, Wang, Bingyan, and Ozaki travel to Osaka with Wang revealing Dorothy's true identity to Jay on the flight.
27	"INTERMISSION 1-4: Taipei Rendezvous"	Unknown	February 23, 2024 (DMM TV)
Dorothy and Ayi head to Rinku Park near the airport to meet up with Jay, and the three head back to Kyoto together. Back in Taipei, Lin frees himself from the constraints and stuns the bodyguard sent to watch over him. Wang sends Ozaki to Kyoto to confront Dorothy, while bringing in his second-in-command Narita to negotiate a deal regarding the Singapore investment. At the Ethiopian restaurant, the owner shows Dorothy to her old room where she finds the wig and coat she wore during the operation to con Wang and puts them on, while two police officers sent by the syndicate comes in to arrest them. Jay beats them up and the three escape. Dorothy and Jay hang out at a family restaurant, but Dorothy walks out after Jay tells her that he refuses to betray his father. Meanwhile, Narita becomes suspicious about Wang given the circumstances of Tsai's death. After Dorothy leaves, Ayi meets up with Jay at the restaurant and end their working relationship. Wang meets up with Igarashi, sent by Cynthia in her place, to negotiate and finalize the Singapore investment. Everybody gathers at a warehouse in Kobe where Bingyan and Ozaki have arranged for Jay to bring Dorothy to Wang, but Jay shows up alone. As Wang was about to punish Jay, Dorothy and Ayi arrive and reveal Laurent as the blondie who conned Wang out. Bingyan knocks Dorothy out and Lin arrives. Bingyan points the gun at Jay before Wang tries to restrain him, and instead Bingyan helps Jay fight back. After Jay knocks him out, Wang receives a phone call from Laurent, telling him that he set everything up and that Bingyan and Igarashi were working for him. Narita hits Wang with a car and ties him up. The next day, Jay tells Dorothy he wants to travel around the world with her, but Dorothy declines. Dorothy kisses Jay before ending their relationship. Several days later, Dorothy's mother travels to Osaka and while waiting for her to arrive at the airport, Dorothy briefly meets Laurent for the first time in ten years.
