= Tragic Dozen =

The Tragic Dozen was a period of 12 years from 1970 to 1982 during which Luis Echeverría and Lopez Portillo were presidents of Mexico. The period was deemed "tragic" by business leaders concerned by the government's populist tendencies and usage of the national oil profits.
