= Gustavo Montoya =

Mexican artist and painter (1905–2003)

Gustavo Montoya (July 9, 1905 – July 12, 2003) was a Mexican artist considered to be a late adherent to the Mexican School of Painting, most often associated with Mexican muralism. He was born in Mexico City, from a family associated with the Porfirio Díaz regime and who had to hide during part of the Mexican Revolution. He attended the Academy of San Carlos despite his father's objections. He later met and married artist Cordelia Urueta, with whom he lived in Paris, developing his artistic talents. He was not heavily involved in Mexico's artistic circles but was a founding member of the Liga de Escritores y Artistas Revolucionarios and the Salón de la Plástica Mexicana. His best-selling work was that of children in regional traditional Mexican clothing, but he also painted many street scenes in Mexico City as well as portraits and still lifes.

== Life ==
He was born in Mexico City on July 9, 1905, to Adolfo Montoya and Concepción Carranco.

His father was part of the Porfirio Díaz government, so when that government fell at the beginning of the Mexican Revolution, the family went into hiding from Mexico City into the state of Morelos. At this time, Gustavo was only seven years old, but he remembered hearing that the Zapatistas had killed two neighboring families. To protect the family, the father moved them frequently, often going to one house at night and Gustavo waking up in another. At one point, they were at the house of a stableman, who dressed the family in their clothes. When Zapatistas came looking for them, they were told the family was not there and then bribed with a silver coin that Montoya's mother had. After a time, Montoya's father decided it was safe enough to return to Mexico City. The father dressed as a priest, taking advice from sympathetic people on how to look, and the family traveled in a large wagon safely.

By 1918, the war had wound down and Montoya was able to finish middle school, when he expressed the desire to become a painter. His father objected but in the end accepted, allowing Montoya to enroll in the Academy of San Carlos. Montoya entered the school at age fifteen, with Germán Gedovius and Roberto Montenegro among his teachers, painting his earliest works such as "Cabeza de viejo", "Desnudo" and "La monja". He stated that the school only taught him the “craft” of art, not the “spirit” of it and for this reason he considered himself a mostly self-taught artist.

His two main passions in life were women and painting. He married his first wife, Luz Saavedra, without his parents’ permission, moving into a very small apartment as the couple was very poor with no means of support. When his father saw this, he offered to help, using connections in Los Angeles to get Gustavo work creating posters in the United States. The couple had one daughter Rosa Elena Montoya Saavedra. The marriage did not last long, and Montoya returned to Mexico. He met his second wife, Cordelia Urueta, at the studio of Pastor Velázquez. Velazquez was renting space that could be used as a studio and Montoya asked Urueta to join him and other artists to rent it. It allowed Montoya to date Urueta.

Montoya proposed to Urueta, who accepted with the condition that he move with her to Europe where she had received a diplomatic post at the Mexican embassy in Paris. He received a grant from the Mexican government to travel to Switzerland, England and Italy to study European vanguard art and resided in Paris with his wife. His time in Europe allowed him to develop as an artist, including learning to paint with his non-dominant left hand in order to experience art from a different physiognomy. In 1965, Montoya and Urueta divorced after twenty six years of marriage.

He was mostly solitary and did not involve himself in artistic circles. However, he was a founding member of the Liga de Escritores y Artistas Revolucionarios along with Cordelia Urueta and others. He was also a founding member of the Salón de la Plástica Mexicana . His last apartment was a modest dwelling on Calle Victoria across from the San Juan Market in the historic center of Mexico City, where he spent the rest of his life.

He won three medals as a tennis player, the last of which when he was seventy five.

His last wife was Trina Hungria. When he died, he had four grandchildren. He died at age 98 in Mexico City on July 12, 2003. His body was cremated at the Panteón Español.

== Career ==
His first professional artistic work was making posters for movies with the West Coast Theaters Co in the United States, starting in 1928.

He returned for a time to Mexico, working with Pastor Velázquez and other artists and working in 1936 at the Escuela Nacional de Artes Plásticas (ENAP) . He then went to Europe, then New York where he had several exhibitions before returning again to Mexico in 1942. At this time, he became focused on the work of fellow Mexicans, joining the Mexican neo-realism movement to continue the traditions of Mexican muralism. He began to teach at ENAP again in 1953.

His first exhibition was at the Durand Gallery in Los Angeles, California followed by exhibits in Mexico as well as Peru, the United States, Belgium, Japan and other countries. In 1945, he exhibited at the Galería de Plástica Mexicana of Inés Amor. In 1949, his work was recognized at the La ciudad de México y sus pintores” event and exhibited his work at the first Bienal Mexicana at the Palacio de Bellas Artes in 1958, at the second Bienal Panamericana in 1960 and then at the Retrato Mexicano event at the Palacio de Bellas Artes in 1961. In 1966 he exhibited at Beverly Hills Collectors Gallery in Los Angeles. His work was exhibited at the Museum of Modern Art in San Antonio, Texas in 1978. In 1985 he exhibited at the Galeria Arte Nucleo in Mexico City. He participated in collective exhibitions at the Museo Mural Diego Rivera and the Galeria Marstelle in 1995 and 1996. In 1997, the Museo Mural Diego Rivera realized an anthology of his work, referring to him as a “Great Silent One.”

His most commercially successful work was that of children dressed in regional traditional clothing, showing influence from Diego Rivera. Most of the collectors of his work were those who appreciated his traditional style, mostly from the United States. Significant works include “Las calles de Mexico" (1945), "Bodegones mexicanos" (1951), "Ninos mexicanos" (1954), "Muros" (1962) and "Ajedrez" (1971). His last works include "Agonia de una tarde", "Autorretrato muerto" and "La muerte canta" in 1996.

== Artistry ==
He spent most of his career painting the streets of Mexico and its inhabitants. He painted murals, still lifes, portraits and street scenes. Elements in his work include mansions, tenements, churches, alleys and markets of Mexico City. He preferred to paint the poor and working class, considering them the more “authentic” of Mexico City's residents. His work has been called “late Mexican School of Painting” as it is in the style of the muralists of the early part of the 20th century.

He was also considered to be an excellent sketch artist, especially creating academic style portraits such as those of his daughter Rosa Elena.
