= Jorge Humberto López Portillo =

Mexican politician (born 1974)

- Born: 29 March 1974 (age 52); Jalisco, Mexico
- Occupation: Politician
- Political party: PRI

Jorge Humberto López Portillo Basave (Note: In this Mexican name, the surname is López Portillo and the second or maternal family name is Basave.) (born 29 March 1974) is a Mexican politician from the Institutional Revolutionary Party (PRI). From 2009 to 2012, during the 61st Congress, he served in the Chamber of Deputies for Jalisco's 6th district. In 2011 he was named as the first Secretary of a newly created Office for Migrant Affairs in the party.

He was the general director of Exportadora de Sal S.A. from July 2013 to December 2014, and was prosecuted for purchasing a new barge without the proper authorization from the administrative committee.
