= Carmen Romano =

Former first lady

Carmen Romano de López Portillo
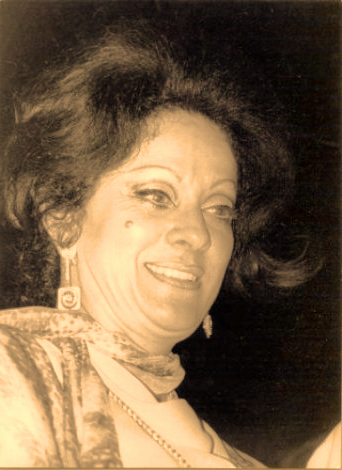

First Lady of Mexico
- In role 1 December 1976 – 30 November 1982
- President: José López Portillo
- Preceded by: María Esther Zuno
- Succeeded by: Paloma Cordero

Personal details
- Born: Carmen Romano Nolk; 10 February 1926 Mexico City, Mexico
- Died: 9 May 2000 (aged 74) Mexico City, Mexico
- Party: PRI
- Spouse: José López Portillo (m. 1951; div. 1991)

Carmen Romano de López Portillo (born Carmen Romano Nolk; 10 February 1926 – 9 May 2000) was the First Lady of Mexico from 1976 to 1982. She was the first wife of Mexican president José López Portillo.

== Politics ==
Romano was the president of the Mexican Foundation for the Development of Children and the Family during her time as First Lady. She also acted as head of the Mexican delegation to a special session of the UNICEF Executive Board.

Romano was invited to Jimmy Carter's presidential inauguration by Rosalynn Carter. She was the only family member of an international head of state to attend the event.

== Personal life and death ==
In the 1970s, actress Sasha Montenegro maintained a relationship with José López Portillo, who was still married to Carmen Romano, with whom he had three children. López Portillo obtained a divorce from Carmen Romano, and then married Montenegro in 1995.

== Gallery ==
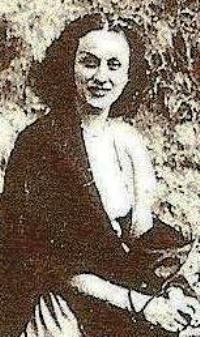
Carmen Romano

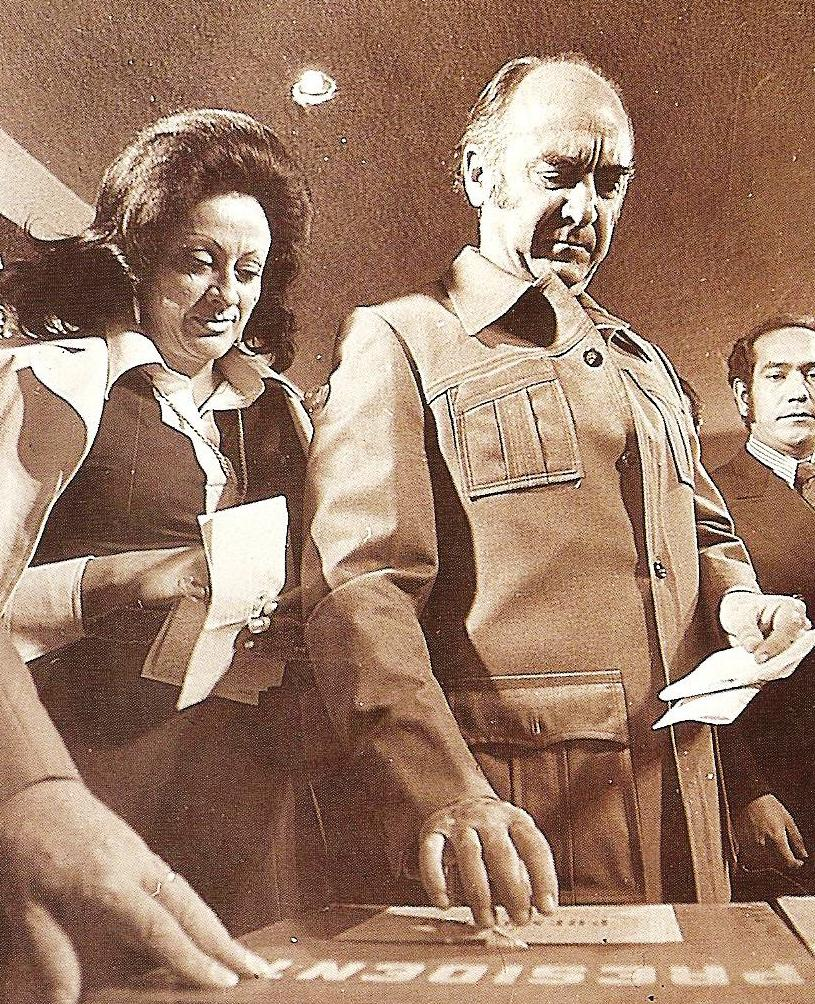
Carmen Romano voting in 1976

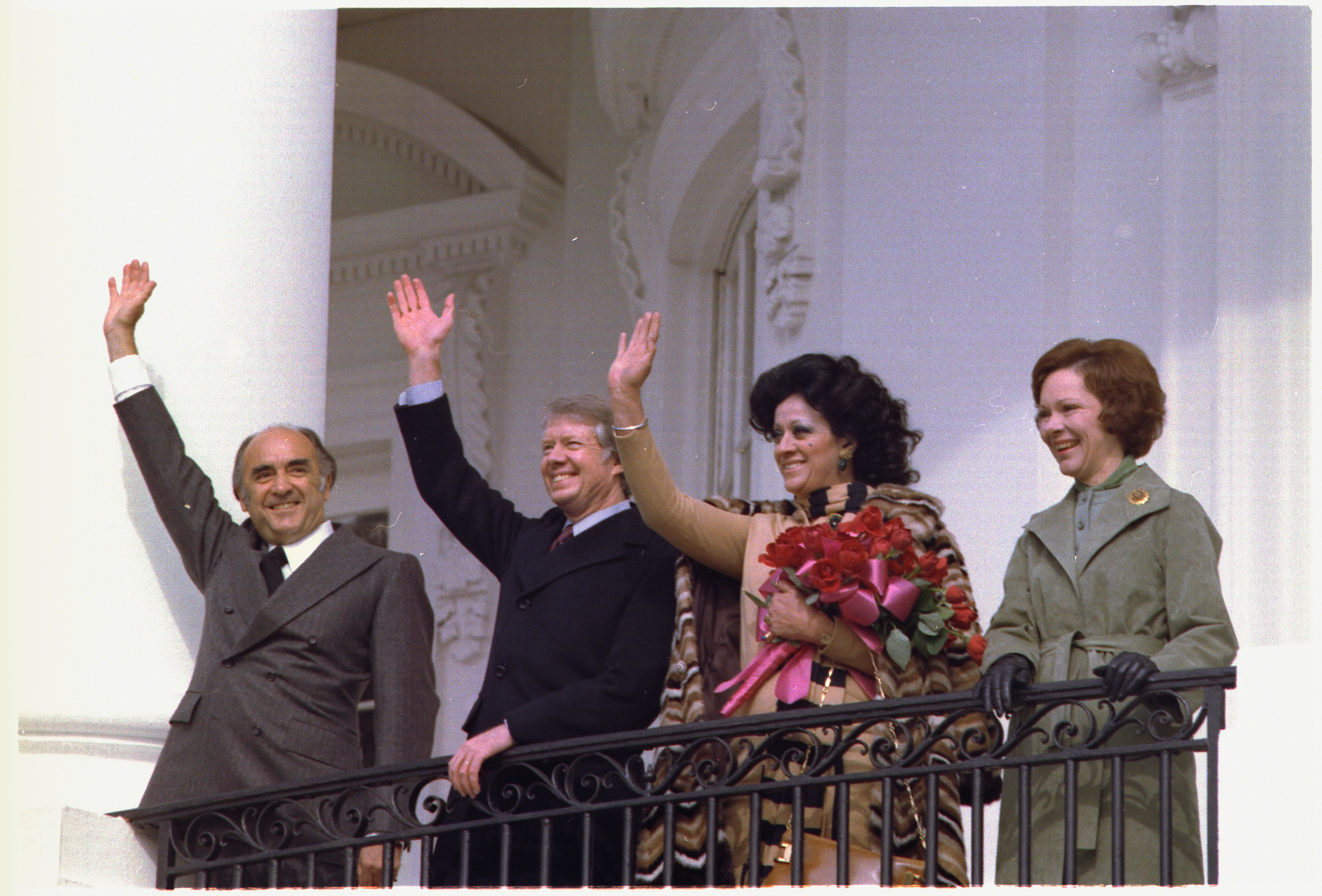
President Jose Lopez Portillo, Jimmy Carter, Mrs. Jose Lopez Portillo and Rosalynn Carter-State Visit Mexico

== See also ==
- List of first ladies of Mexico
- Politics of Mexico

Honorary titles
Preceded by María Esther Zuno de Echeverría	First Lady of Mexico; 1976-1982	Succeeded by Paloma Cordero de De la Madrid
Preceded by Non; Organism created in 1977	President of the Consultative Council of Integral Family Development; 1977-1982	Succeeded by Paloma Cordero de De la Madrid
