= Joel Arellano Arellano =

Mexican politician (born 1978)

- Born: 24 November 1978 (age 47); Jalisco, Mexico
- Occupation: Politician
- Political party: PAN

Joel Arellano Arellano (born 24 November 1978) is a Mexican politician affiliated with the National Action Party (PAN). In the 2006 general election he was elected to the Chamber of Deputies to represent Jalisco's 6th district during the 60th session of Congress.
