= Francisco Gamboa =

Francisco Gamboa may refer to:

- Francisco Gamboa (footballer) (born 1985), Mexican footballer
- Francisco Gamboa (politician) (born 1980), Costa Rican politician
- Francisco de Gamboa (1599–1674), Spanish prelate of the Roman Catholic Church
- Francisco Gamboa Herrera, Mexican politician, represented the 3rd federal electoral district of Durango
- Francisco Antonio Gamboa, Colombian poet and educator, brother of Isaías Gamboa
