= Gonzalo Moreno Arévalo =

Mexican politician (born 1958)

- Born: 21 August 1958 (age 68); Jalisco, Mexico
- Education: University of Guadalajara
- Occupation: Politician
- Political party: PRI

Gonzalo Moreno Arévalo (born 21 August 1958) is a Mexican politician affiliated with the Institutional Revolutionary Party (PRI). In the 2003 mid-terms he was elected to the Chamber of Deputies to represent Jalisco's 6th district during the 59th session of Congress.
