= Abel Salgado Peña =

Mexican politician (born 1971)

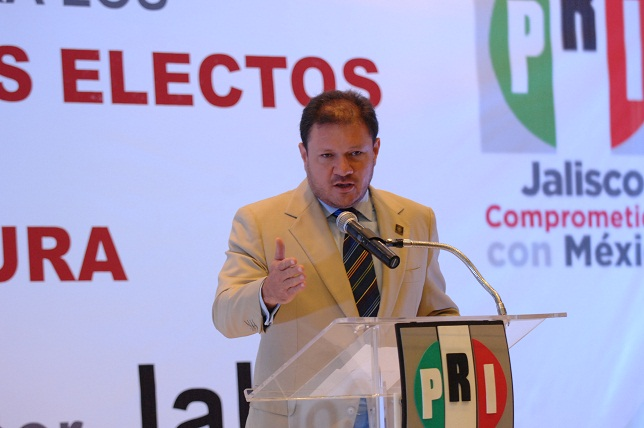
- Abel Salgado Peña in 2012
- Born: 4 September 1971 (age 54); Jalisco, Mexico
- Occupation: Politician
- Political party: PRI
- Website: http://abelsalgado.com/

Abel Octavio Salgado Peña (born September 4, 1971) is a Mexican politician affiliated with the Institutional Revolutionary Party (PRI).

Salgado Peña is a native of the state of Jalisco. From August 29, 2012, to August 31, 2015, he served in the Chamber of Deputies during the 62nd Congress, representing Jalisco's 6th district (Zapopan).
