= Cordelia Urueta =

Mexican artist (1908–1995)

Cordelia Urueta Sierra (September 16, 1908 – November 3, 1995) was a Mexican artist. She is best known for her use of color and abstraction but still retaining frequent reference to the human form. She was born into an intellectual and artistic family, related to painter David Alfaro Siqueiros and educator Justo Sierra. Her father, writer and diplomat Jesús Urueta, died when she was eleven with her health becoming quite poor afterwards. She began drawing when she was a child, mostly portraits with Dr. Atl noticing her talent. She did not have extensive formal training but became an art teacher, meeting a number of contemporary Mexican artists, including her husband Gustavo Montoya. After a time in Paris and New York, she returned to Mexico permanently in 1950 to dedicate herself to painting, exhibiting extensively in Mexico and abroad mostly in the 1950s and 1960s. She was offered the National Prize for Arts and Sciences but rejected it.

== Life ==
Cordelia Urueta was born on September 16, 1908, in Coyoacán (then separate from Mexico City) into a family of intellectuals, artists, diplomats and filmmakers. Her father was Jesús Urueta Siqueiros, an art critic with Revista Moderna who was also a speaker and diplomat.

Her mother was Tarsila Sierra, daughter of journalist Santiago Sierra and niece of educator Justo Sierra, who was Cordelia's tutor. She was a cousin of David Alfaro Siqueiros. Her sister Margarita Urueta, would later become a noted playwright.

She grew up during the Mexican Revolution and her father was heavily involved in efforts to unite the various factions vying for power after the ouster of Porfirio Díaz, serving in a number of political posts as well as writing. Her childhood home was also the home of the magazine Revista Moderna and the prints on the magazines attracted her attention as well as those in the many books of the family library. Her father also had a collection of copies of European sculpture.

Urueta did not remember when she began to draw but it was mostly to copy the art she saw in the books, with works by Tiziano being her favorite. She was expelled from school when she was young for drawing pictures of nuns who were clothed on the front of the paper but naked on the back. Her father then hired the best painting teacher he could find for her. Through her father, she knew Dr. Atl, who she called Uncle Murillo, who was first to recognize her talent after seeing some of her portraits.

In 1919, the family moved to Buenos Aires after her father received a diplomatic post but returned after her father died in December 1920 when Cordelia was only eleven years old. Returning to Mexico, she went into a very long period of mourning for her father, eating little and worrying her doctors, who prescribed long walks. The family returned to Mexico much poorer, living in a smaller house with few amenities. This and her long mourning for her father seriously affected her health, causing uncontrolled anemia. Her doctors prescribed walking which she did along Paseo de la Reforma to the Alameda Central .

In the 1920s, artist Alfredo Ramos Martínez began the Escuela de Pintura de Aire Libre in Churubusco at which she took classes. She preferred drawing, often doing portraits of servants and of her friends. Urueta said that her time with the school was important as it taught her the value of nationalistic themes as well as those related to the Mexican people. It also taught her that art was a true vocation rather than just a hobby.

Her health continued to be poor and in 1929 her mother took her to New York to visit a relative. There she met poet José Juan Tablada, a distant relative, who introduced her to Alma Reed, owner of Delfic Studios art gallery and noted promoter of Mexican art. Reed invited Urueta to participate in a collective exhibition along with José Clemente Orozco and Rufino Tamayo, but after this her health forced her to temporarily retire from painting. However, Orozco commented favorably on her work.

In 1932 she returned to the fine arts as an art teacher with the Secretaría de Educación Pública . Through the SEP, she began to meet a number of prominent Mexican artists including Leopoldo Méndez, Juan Soriano, Carlos Mérida, María Izquierdo, Francisco Gamboa and Pastor Velázquez . Because she did not have extensive academic preparation, she used her connections to learn, especially from Gustavo Montoya, who had studied at the Academy of San Carlos . At Pastor Velazquez's workshop she was permitted to draw the models he employed. She rented studio space with Montoya and two other artists in spite of the fact that this caused her problems with her family.

In 1938, she used her family's connections to obtain a chancellor post at the Mexican embassy in Paris. While preparing for the trip, Montoya proposed to her. She accepted on the condition that he accompany her. In Paris, they came across David Alfaro Siquieros, a cousin and spent time with him and other artists in the cafes of the city. Their time there contributed to the artistic development of both. Shortly before World War II began, the Paris embassy staff was evacuated with Urueta and Montoya transferred to the New York consulate. There Urueta became interested in the work of Picasso and Braque.

She returned permanently to Mexico to paint professionally, reaching her peak in the late 1950s into the 1960s. From that time until her death, she had a wide circle of intellectual and artist friends which included Elena Poniatowska, Carlos Fuentes, Juan Soriano, Luis Barragán, Xavier Villaurrutia, María Izquierdo, Alfredo Zalce and Daniel Cosío Villegas .

In 1965, she and Montoya divorced after twenty-six years of marriage, which upset her greatly.

She died at age 87 on November 3, 1995, after a long illness and was buried at Panteón Jardín in Mexico City.

== Career ==
She was a painter, teacher, diplomat and art promoter and a founding member of the Salón de la Plástica Mexicana . She worked as an art teacher starting in 1932 until she left in 1938 to live in Paris. Her art career was on hold until 1950, when she and her husband returned to Mexico and she dedicated herself to painting and exhibitions. Her first was with the Salón de la Plástica Mexicana in 1950. Family friend and supporter Dr. Atl wrote the introduction to the catalog of this event. From the 1950s to the 1960s, she had numerous showings of her work in Mexico and abroad, including, France, Jerusalem, Scandinavia, Peru, Honduras, Japan and New York. In 1967 she had a major individual exhibition at the Galería de Arte Mexicano, followed by an exhibition at the Museo de Arte Moderno in 1970, which also did a retrospective of her work in 1985.

Her best work is considered to be that of the late 1950s and early 1960s, winning biennials such as the Interamericana de Pintura and the VI Bienal in São Paulo, Brazil in 1961. She was a featured artist in the book “Cien años de la pintura Mexicana” in 1967 and her work appeared in other books such as Engranaje, Las Muertes, Forma ancetrales, Antagonismo, En la calle, Tierra quemada and Petroleo, mostly between 1975 and 1981. She rejected the Premio Nacional de Arte arguing that the word “homage” had become reviled.

Her work can be found in permanent collection the Museo de Arte Moderno in Mexico City.

== Artistry ==
Although she was not integrated into Mexico's artistic scene, her work mostly fits into the then dominant Mexican School of Painting, especially her earlier work with often focused on portraits. Her artistic development was to strive to find her own style and she succeeded in creating a number of novelties, such as figures that eventually disappeared, ceding importance to textures and color.

She felt that the use of color best expressed her emotions, with her work best noted for its use of color, considered to be one of Mexico ‘s “great coloristas.” Her later work became more abstract but with frequent reference to the human form, showing influence from Tamayo. She has been called the “Grande Dame of Abstract Art.”
