= José López Portillo y Weber =

Mexican writer (1889–1974)

- Born: 19 April 1889; Guadalajara, Jalisco, Mexico
- Died: 17 January 1974 (aged 84); Mexico City, Mexico
- Children: José López Portillo y Pacheco
- Parent(s): José López Portillo y Rojas; Margarita Weber y Narváez

José López Portillo y Weber (19 April 1889 – 17 January 1974) was a Mexican engineer, historian, investigator and academic. He specialized in the history of Nueva Galicia and Jalisco. He was the son of politician José López Portillo y Rojas and father of president José López Portillo.

== Published works ==
- Historia del petróleo en México
- La conquista de Nueva Galicia, in 1935.
- La génesis de los signos de las letras, in 1935.
- La rebelión de Nueva Galicia, in 1939.
- Guadalajara de fin de siglo, in 1950.
- Dinámica histórica de México, in 1953.
- Cristóbal de Oñate: historia novela, in 1955.
- Jalisco y el golpe de estado de Comonfort, in 1958.
- Guadalajara, el Hospicio Cabañas y su fundador, in 1971.
