= Margarita Urueta =

Margarita Urueta (13 November 1918 in Mexico City – 2004 in Cuernavaca) was a Mexican writer. She wrote plays, novels and essays, both for the general public and for children. Her style ranges from realism to avant-garde and absurdist.

== Biography ==
Margarita Urueta began writing at the age of seven. As a young girl, she made a trip to Europe, where she studied and became acquainted with the new trends in theatre and which would later influence her own works.

She was primarily noted as dramaturge. She held the position of president of the Teatro de México and was the owner of the Jesús Urueta Theatre in Mexico City.

She was the daughter of the Mexican revolutionary Jesús Urueta and author of his biography, entitled Jesús Urueta. Historia de un gran desamor and published in 1964.

She was the sister of Cordelia Urueta, a noted painter, and the prominent filmmaker Chano Urueta, both Mexican.

== Selected works ==
=== Cinema ===
- Hombres de mar (Men of the Sea). Filmed with Arturo de Córdova and Pedro Armendáriz.

=== Plays ===
- San Lunes (1941)
- Una hora de vida. Mansión para turistas (1943)
- Ave de sacrificio (1945)
- Duda infinita (1959)
- La mujer transparente (1960)
- Grajú (1962)
- Teatro nuevo de Margarita Urueta (1963)
- El señor perro (1963)
- El hombre y su máscara (1964)
- El Ruido (1964)
- Juanito Membrillo (1964)
- Caminata de las Tres Marías. Pastorela. Sin fecha.
- Poderoso caballero es don dinero (1965)
- La muerte de un soltero (1966)
- Confesiones de Sor Juana Inés de la Cruz (1976)

=== Novels ===
- Espía sin ser (1941)
- Mediocre (1947)
- Hasta mañana, compadre (1976)

=== Antologies ===
- Conversación sencilla (1936)
- El mar la distraía (1940)
- Amor en 13 Dimensiones. Short stories (1970) Second edition: (1971) Editorial Novaro.

=== Other publications ===
- Alma de perfil (essay, 1933)
- Jesús Urueta. Historia de un gran desamor (biography of his father, Jesús Urueta, 1964).

=== Theatre premieres ===
- Ave de sacrificio (1942). Fábregas Theatre. With María Teresa Montoya.
- Duda infinita (1955). Rhone Theatre.
- La mujer transparente (1959). Sphere Theatre. Directed by: Alexandro (Jodorowsky).
- El señor perro (1963). Jesús Urueta Theatre. Directed by: Alexandro (Jodorowsky). With Enrique Borja.
- El hombre y su máscara (1964). Jesús Urueta Theatre. Directed by: Alexandro (Jodorowsky). With María Teresa Rivas, Carlos Ancira. Scenography and music: Luis Urías.
- El Ruido (1964). Premiere: Thursday 5 March. Jesús Urueta Theatre. Directed by: Alexandro (Jodorowsky). With María Teresa Rivas, Carlos Ancira, Héctor Suárez, Bernardette Landrú, Enrique Reyes. Scenography and music: Luis Urías. (From Programa de mano. Archivo Luis Urías.)
- La muerte de un soltero (1967). Jesús Urueta Theatre.
- Confesiones de Sor Juana Inés de la Cruz (1969). Hidalgo Theatre. According to quotes in Amor en 13 Dimensiones. Margarita Urueta. Editorial Novaro. Mexico. 2nd edition. 1971.
