= Isaías Gamboa =

Colombian poet

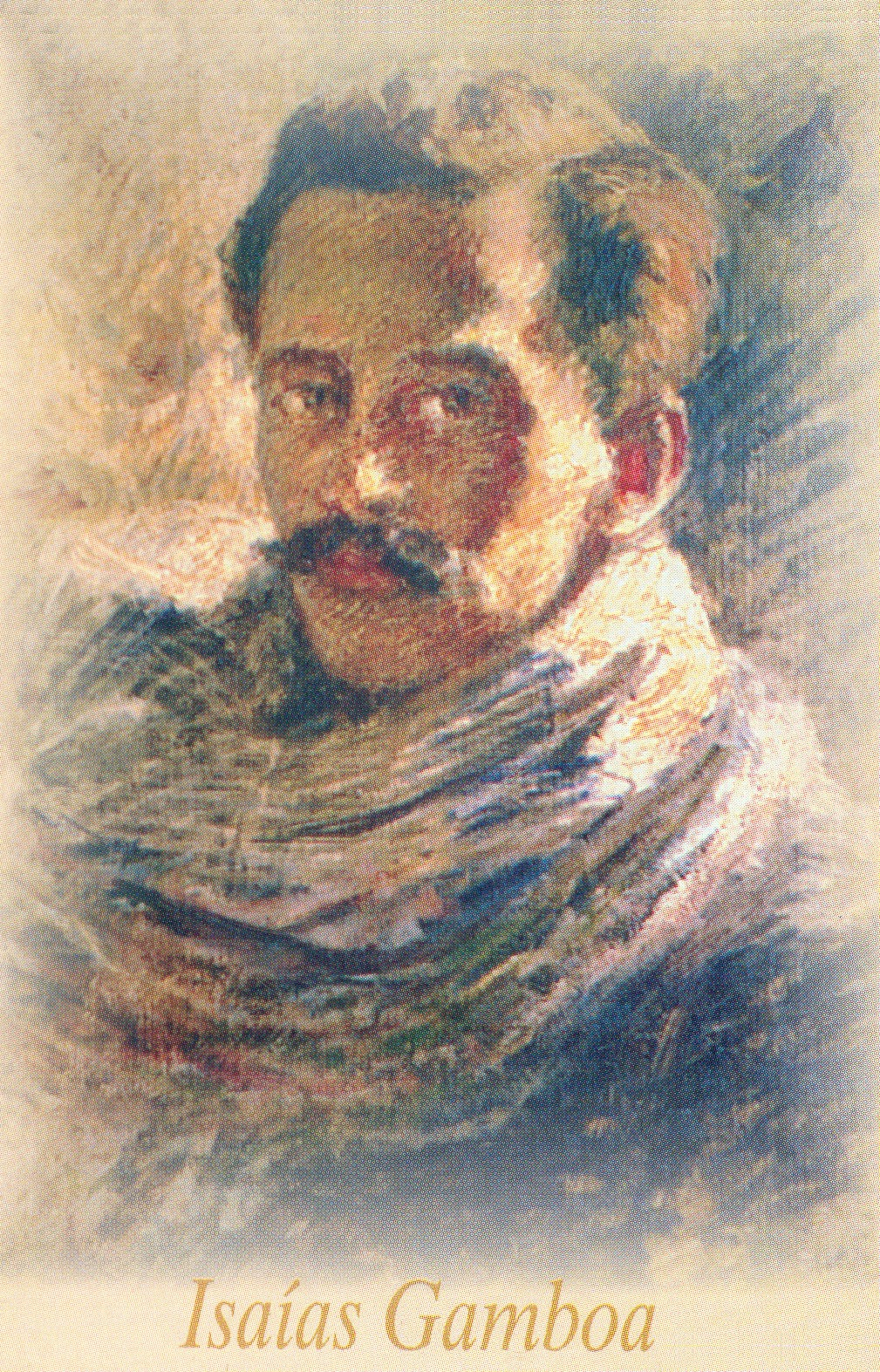
- Born: Isaías Gamboa Herrera; December 12, 1872; Cali, Colombia
- Died: July 23, 1904 (aged 31); Callao, Peru
- Monuments: Isaias Gamboa Park & Statue
- Occupations: Poet, Educator
- Notable work: Tierra Nativa
- Parents: Mateo Gamboa Llanos (father); Maria Teresa Herrera Cordoba (mother)

Isaías Gamboa Herrera (December 12, 1872 – July 23, 1904) was a Colombian poet and educator.

== Early years ==
Isaías Gamboa Herrera was born on December 12, 1872 in Cali. Isaias was brought up in a traditional Colombian family consisting of Mateo Gamboa Llanos and Maria Teresa Herrera Córdoba, a mother who instilled ideals of liberty and justice, ideals which would influence him as a writer and educator. He shared these ideals with his older brother, Francisco Antonio Gamboa, who migrated to El Salvador and became the first education minister, founder of the public school system in the country and the first school for teachers.

His childhood was developed among the green landscapes of El Mameyal, just outside the city of Cali, that inspired his posthumous novel "Tierra Nativa" written in Santiago.

He attended elementary school in Santa Librada, founded by General Francisco de Paula Santander in 1822. Additionally received private lessons in grammar and literature from Alcides Isaacs, brother of famous writer Jorge Isaacs, author of La Maria.

== El Salvador and Chile ==
He followed the footsteps of his brother Francisco to El Salvador in 1893 where he published his first poems. He was very active in literary circles and was an editor of the magazine "El Figaro" which appeared in 1894-5.

After spending time in Costa Rica he migrated in 1901 to Santiago where he became a well-known poet, publishing poems in literary magazines and participating in Poetic Festivals with his poem "Ante el mar", that made him famous. He is cited in the public education curriculum in Chile.

He became ill and decided to go back home to see his mother one last time and boarded a ship in Valparaíso but due to his deteriorating health he was disembarked in El Callao the port of the city of Lima, Peru where he died in the Hospital de Guadalupe on July 23, 1904.

== Tributes ==
The city of Cali decided ten years after his death to bring his remains and commissioned a delegation that brought his coffin home and was buried in the Capilla de San Antonio.

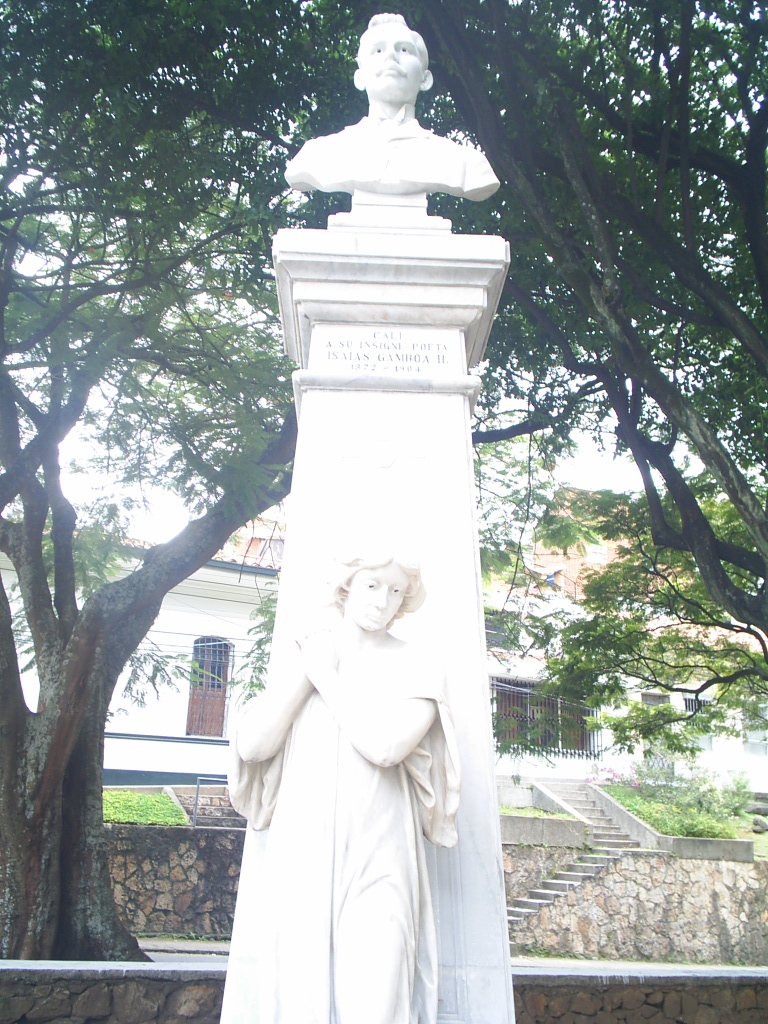
Statue of Isaías Gamboa.

A statue was erected in a small park named after the poet close to the San Antonio church. A Public Library was dedicated in his name and an anthology of his poems was published in Santiago, selected and edited with critical notes by Julio Molina Nunez and in Cali in 2001.

At the centenary of his birth, in July 2004, the "Festival de Poesía Isaís Gamboa" was held in Cali in memory of the poet and the book "Los Gamboa: Una Dinastia de Poetas" was published by the poet Hugo Cuevas-Mohr and the historian Vicente Perez Silva. A videoseries with the same name was developed in 2018 commemorating the more than 36 poets and writers of the Gamboa family, including an episode about Isaias Gamboa.

== Works ==
=== Poetry Books ===
- Mis Poesias, Ediciones Nascimento (1929)
- Obra Poetica (2001)

=== Novels ===
- Tierra Nativa (1st edition "El Imparcial", 1904; 2nd ed. 1944; 3rd ed. 2001) - The audio book appeared in 2023 in a podcast.
