= Nuevo México, Zapopan =

Coordinates: 20.750°N 103.433°W

Nuevo México is the second-largest city in the municipality of Zapopan in the state of Jalisco in Mexico. The city is a suburb lying just northwest of the city of Zapopan, which is the municipal seat of the municipality, about halfway between it and the city of Tesistán. The entire area is part of the Guadalajara metropolitan area. Nuevo México had a population of 42,246 at the census of 2005. The city's name references Santa Fe de Nuevo México, modern day New Mexico.
