= José López Portillo =

President of Mexico from 1976 to 1982

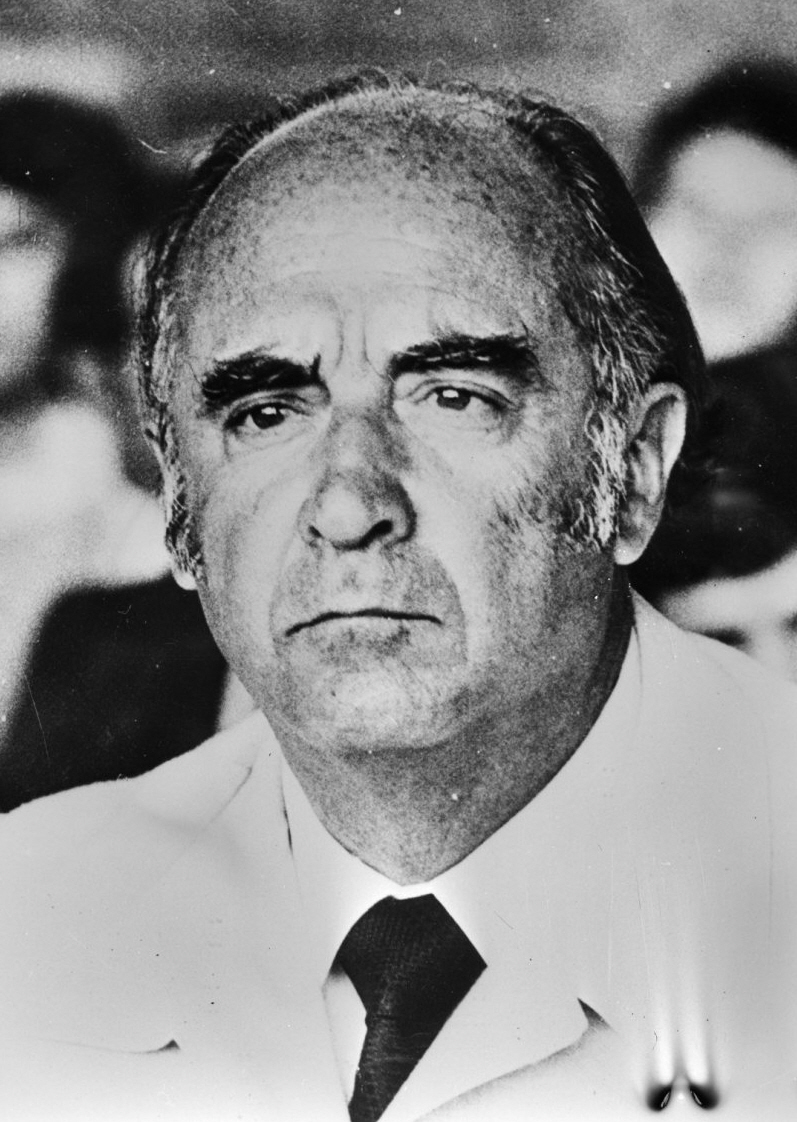
- López Portillo in 1976

58th President of Mexico
- In office 1 December 1976 – 30 November 1982
- Preceded by: Luis Echeverría
- Succeeded by: Miguel de la Madrid

Secretary of Finance and Public Credit of Mexico
- In office 29 May 1973 – 22 September 1975
- President: Luis Echeverría
- Preceded by: Hugo B. Margáin
- Succeeded by: Mario Ramón Beteta

Director of the Federal Electricity Commission
- In office 18 February 1972 – 29 May 1973
- Preceded by: Guillermo Villarreal Caravantes
- Succeeded by: Arsenio Farell Cubillas

Personal details
- Born: José Guillermo Abel López Portillo y Pacheco; 16 June 1920 Mexico City, Mexico
- Died: 17 February 2004 (aged 83) Mexico City, Mexico
- Resting place: Cementerio Militar, Mexico City
- Party: PRI
- Spouses: Carmen Romano (m. 1951; div. 1991) Sasha Montenegro (m. 1995)
- Parent(s): José López Portillo y Weber; Refugio Pacheco Villa-Gordoa
- Education: National Autonomous University of Mexico (LLB)

José Guillermo Abel López Portillo y Pacheco (Spanish pronunciation: [xoˈse ˈlopes poɾˈtiʝo]; 16 June 1920 – 17 February 2004) was a Mexican writer, lawyer, and politician affiliated with the Institutional Revolutionary Party (PRI) who served as the 58th president of Mexico from 1976 to 1982. López Portillo was the only official candidate in the 1976 presidential election, being the only president in recent Mexican history to win an election unopposed.

Politically, the López Portillo administration began a process of partial political openness by passing an electoral reform in 1977 [es] which loosened the requisites for the registration of political parties (thus providing dissidents from the left, many of whom had hitherto been engaged in armed conflict against the government, with a path to legally participate in national politics) and allowed for greater representation of opposition parties in the Chamber of Deputies, as well as granting amnesty to many of the guerrilla fighters from the Dirty War. On the economic front, López Portillo was the last of the so-called economic nationalist Mexican presidents. His tenure was marked by heavy investments in the national oil industry after the discovery of new oil reserves, which propelled initial economic growth, but later gave way to a severe debt crisis after the international oil prices fell in the summer of 1981, leading Mexico to declare a sovereign default in 1982. As a result of the crisis, the last months of his administration were plagued by widespread capital flight, leading López Portillo to nationalize the banks three months before leaving office, and by the end of his term Mexico had the highest external debt in the world. His presidency was also marked by widespread government corruption and nepotism.

Shortly after leaving office, during the presidency of his successor Miguel de la Madrid, numerous officials who had worked under the López Portillo administration were prosecuted for corruption, the most notorious cases being Arturo Durazo and Jorge Díaz Serrano. Although López Portillo himself was suspected of having been involved in corruption as well, he was never charged with any crimes. It was revealed after his death that he had been a CIA collaborator before he became president of Mexico.

López Portillo died from complications of pneumonia at his home in Mexico City on 17 February 2004 at the age of 83, and was buried at the Mexico City Military Cemetery.

== Early life and education ==
José Guillermo Abel López Portillo y Pacheco was born on 16 June 1920 in Mexico City, to his father, José López Portillo y Weber (1888–1974), an engineer, historian, researcher, and academic, and his mother, Refugio Pacheco y Villa-Gordoa. He was the grandson of José López Portillo y Rojas, a lawyer, politician, and man of letters. Another ancestor was a Royal Judge in the Audiencia de Nueva Galicia in the eighteenth century. He was the great-great-great-grandson of José María Narváez (1768–1840), a Spanish explorer who was the first to enter the Strait of Georgia, in present-day British Columbia, and the first to view the site now occupied by Vancouver. He studied law at the National Autonomous University of Mexico (UNAM) before beginning his political career.

== Early career ==
After graduating, he began his political career with the Institutional Revolutionary Party (PRI) in 1959. He held several positions in the administrations of his two predecessors before being appointed to serve as finance minister under Luis Echeverría, a close friend from childhood, between 1973 and 1975.

An ideological centrist, López Portillo frequently asserted that he was "neither of the right or the left".

== Presidency (1976–1982) ==
=== Domestic policy ===
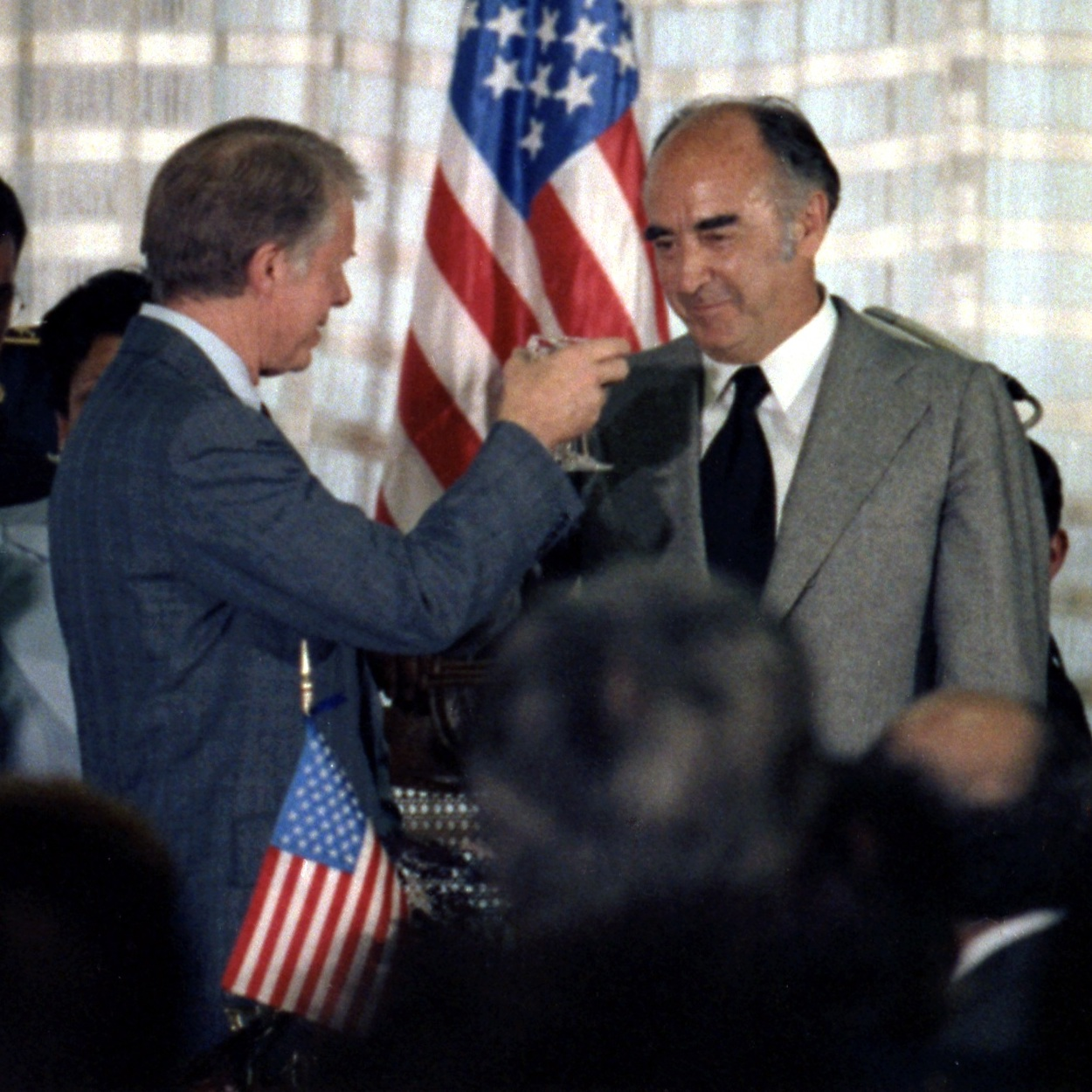
U.S. President Jimmy Carter (left) and Mexican president José López Portillo (right) toast during a luncheon hosted by the president of Mexico.

López Portillo was elected unopposed in 1976, though in any event the PRI was so entrenched that he was effectively assured of victory when Echeverría chose him as the PRI's candidate. To date, he is the last Mexican president to run unopposed.

When he entered office, Mexico was in the midst of an economic crisis. He undertook an ambitious program to promote Mexico's economic development with revenues stemming from the discovery of new petroleum reserves in the states of Veracruz and Tabasco by Petróleos Mexicanos (Pemex), the country's publicly owned oil company. In 1980, Mexico joined Venezuela in the Pact of San José, a foreign aid project to sell oil at preferential rates to countries in Central America and the Caribbean. The economic confidence that he fostered led to a short-term boost in economic growth, but by the time he left office, the economy had deteriorated and gave way to a severe debt crisis and a sovereign default.

One of his last acts as president, announced during his annual State of the Nation address on 1 September 1982, was to order the nationalization of the country's banking system.

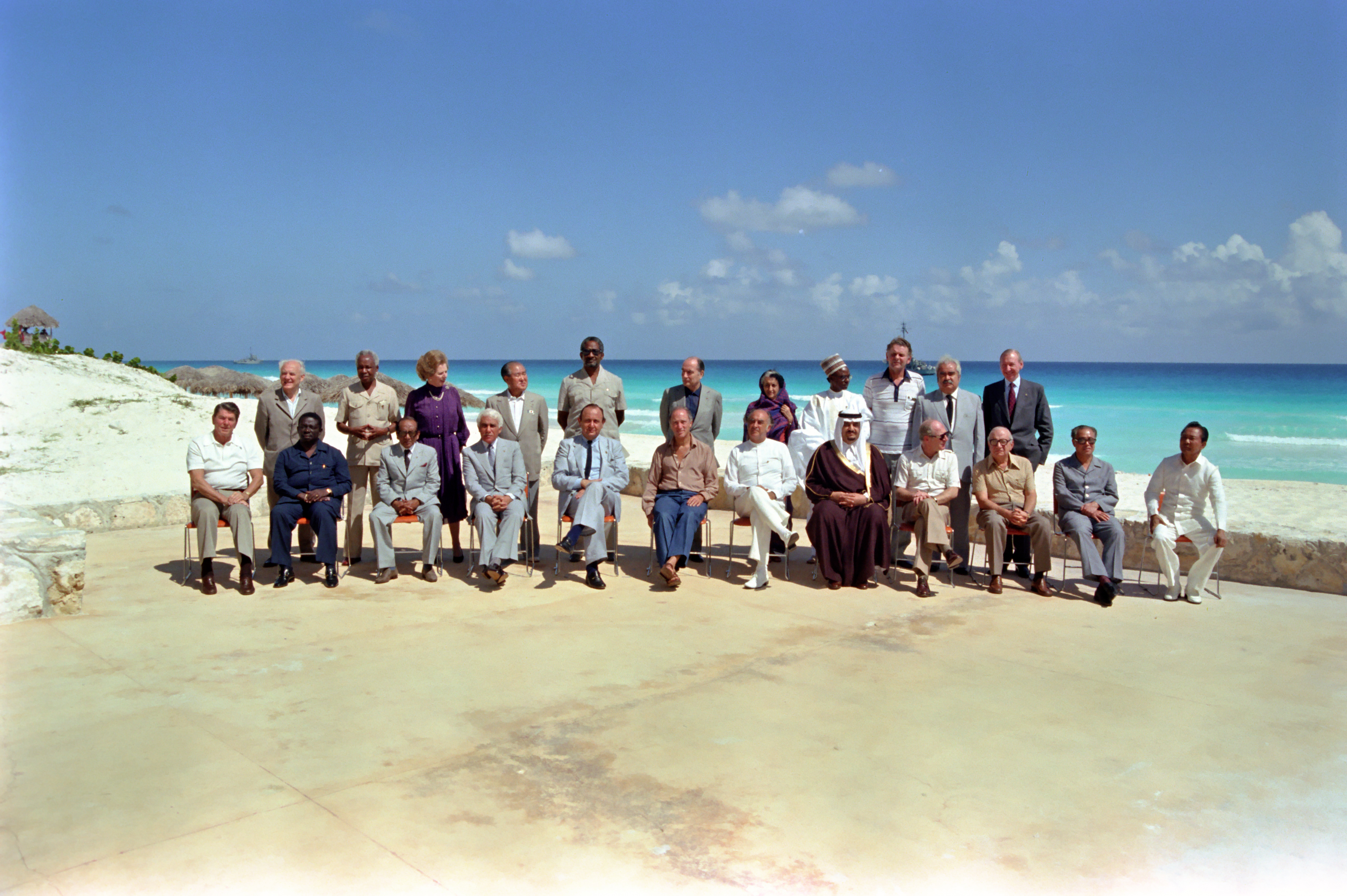
Heads of State at the Cancún North–South Summit in 1981

During his presidential term, his critics accused him of corruption and nepotism.

An electoral reform conducted during his presidential term increased the number of members of the Chamber of Deputies to 400: 300 being elected single-member districts by plurality voting (uninominales) and 100 being elected according to proportional representation (plurinominales). The reform furthermore opened the electoral process for small opposition parties.

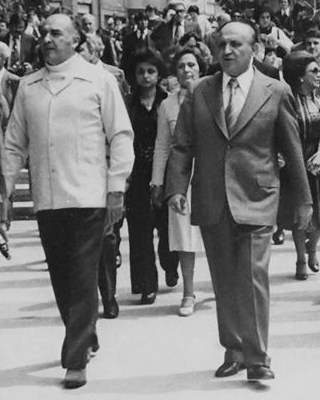
Former Bulgarian leader, Todor Zhivkov (right) and Mexican president José López Portillo (left) official visit in Plovdiv – the second-largest city in Bulgaria.

Lopez Portillo's administration was regarded as more moderate than that of Echeverria's, with one observer noting in 1978 how "The independent labor movement gained momentum during the final years of the President Luis Echeverria administration, generally considered to the left of the current government."

During the course of Lopez Portillo's presidency, public spending as a percentage of GDP rose from 32% to 46%.

==== Nepotism ====
The López Portillo administration was notorious, more than previous administrations, for the number of relatives of the President who held public office. He appointed his sister Margarita López Portillo head of the General Directorate of Radio, Television and Cinematography (RTC), his cousin Guillermo López Portillo as the first -and only- head of the newly created National Institute of Sport (INDE, which was dissolved in 1981), and his son José Ramón López Portillo (who was described by the President as "the pride of my nepotism") was appointed Subsecretary of Programming and the Budget. His daughter Paulina López Portillo also debuted as a pop singer during his Presidency, and the First Lady Carmen Romano toured Europe with the Philharmonic Orchestra of Mexico City, which was founded and financed by the government of Mexico City through her initiative "to make fine arts education accessible to youths".

=== Foreign policy ===
In 1981, the Cancun Summit, a North-South dialogue, took place. The summit was attended by 22 heads of state and government from industrialized countries (North) and developing nations (South). During López Portillo's presidential term, Mexico supported the Sandinista National Liberation Front in Nicaragua. In 1977, after the death of dictator Francisco Franco, Mexico resumed diplomatic relations with Spain. Also, in 1979 Pope John Paul II visited Mexico for the first time.

In 1979, López Portillo offered asylum to the deposed Shah Mohammad Reza Pahlavi of Iran, who spent some months in Cuernavaca before being admitted into the United States to receive medical treatment for his cancer.

==== Official international trips ====
This is a list of official trips abroad made by López Portillo during his presidency.

According to Article 88 of the Constitution of Mexico, the president may leave the country for up to seven days by informing the Senate or, where applicable, the Permanent Commission in advance of the reasons for the absence, as well as of the results of the measures carried out. For absences longer than seven days, permission from the Senate or the Permanent Commission is required.

Date	Destination	Main purpose
1976
No official foreign visits
1977
13–17 February	Williamsburg, Washington, D.C. and Chicago (United States)	State visit.
6–8 August	Bogotá (Colombia)	Participation in a summit meeting with presidents Alfonso López Michelsen of Colombia, Daniel Oduber of Costa Rica, Carlos Andrés Pérez of Venezuela, Omar Torrijos, head of government of Panama, and prime minister of Jamaica Michael Manley, concerning the negotiations regarding the Panama Canal.
8–16 October	Madrid, Las Palmas, Seville, Barcelona, Pamplona and Caparroso (Spain)	State visit. Meeting with King Juan Carlos I.
1978 (Note: Before the tour of the Soviet Union and Bulgaria, there was a brief stop in Hamburg on 16 May, with official activities only with local authorities. Before the tour of Asia, he stayed overnight in Okinawa on 20 October. He had scheduled a meeting with President Ferdinand Marcos of the Philippines in Guam on 19 October, but it was cancelled بسبب bad weather.)
17–25 May	Moscow, Baku, Novosibirsk and Leningrad (Soviet Union)	State visit. Meeting with Leonid Brezhnev, top leader of the Soviet Union. Signing of energy agreements.
25–29 May	Sofia, Plovdiv and Varna (Bulgaria)	State visit.
21–30 October	Beijing, Suzhou and Shanghai (China)	State visit.
30 October – 5 November	Tokyo, Nagoya and Kyoto (Japan)	State visit.
5 November	Manila (Philippines)	State visit.
1979
28–29 September	Washington, D.C. (United States)	State visit.
30 September – 1 October	Panama Canal Zone (Panama)	Participation in the ceremony marking the entry into force of the Torrijos–Carter Treaties.
1980
24 January	Managua (Nicaragua)	State visit.
16–19 May	Paris (France)	State visit.
19–22 May	Bonn (Germany)	State visit.
22–25 May	Stockholm (Sweden)	State visit.
25–28 May	Ottawa and Toronto (Canada)	State visit.
25–27 July	San José (Costa Rica)	State visit. Signing of the San José Agreement for Mexico and Venezuela to supply oil to Central America and the Caribbean.
28–30 July	Brasília and São Paulo (Brazil)	State visit.
30 July – 3 August	Havana (Cuba)	State visit.
1981 (Note: Brief stop of a few hours in Athens on the return from India. Cultural activities with local authorities.)
23–25 January	Cairo (Egypt)	State visit.
25–30 January	New Delhi, Agra and Bombay (India)	State visit.
8–9 June	Washington, D.C. (United States)	Working visit.
4–5 September	Guatemala City (Guatemala)	Working visit.
17–19 September	Grand Rapids (United States)	Informal meeting with President Ronald Reagan and Prime Minister Pierre Trudeau at the dedication of the Gerald R. Ford Presidential Museum and Library.
1982
21 February	Managua (Nicaragua)	Visit to receive a decoration from the Nicaraguan government.
11–12 October	Santo Domingo (Dominican Republic)	State visit.

== Presidential succession ==
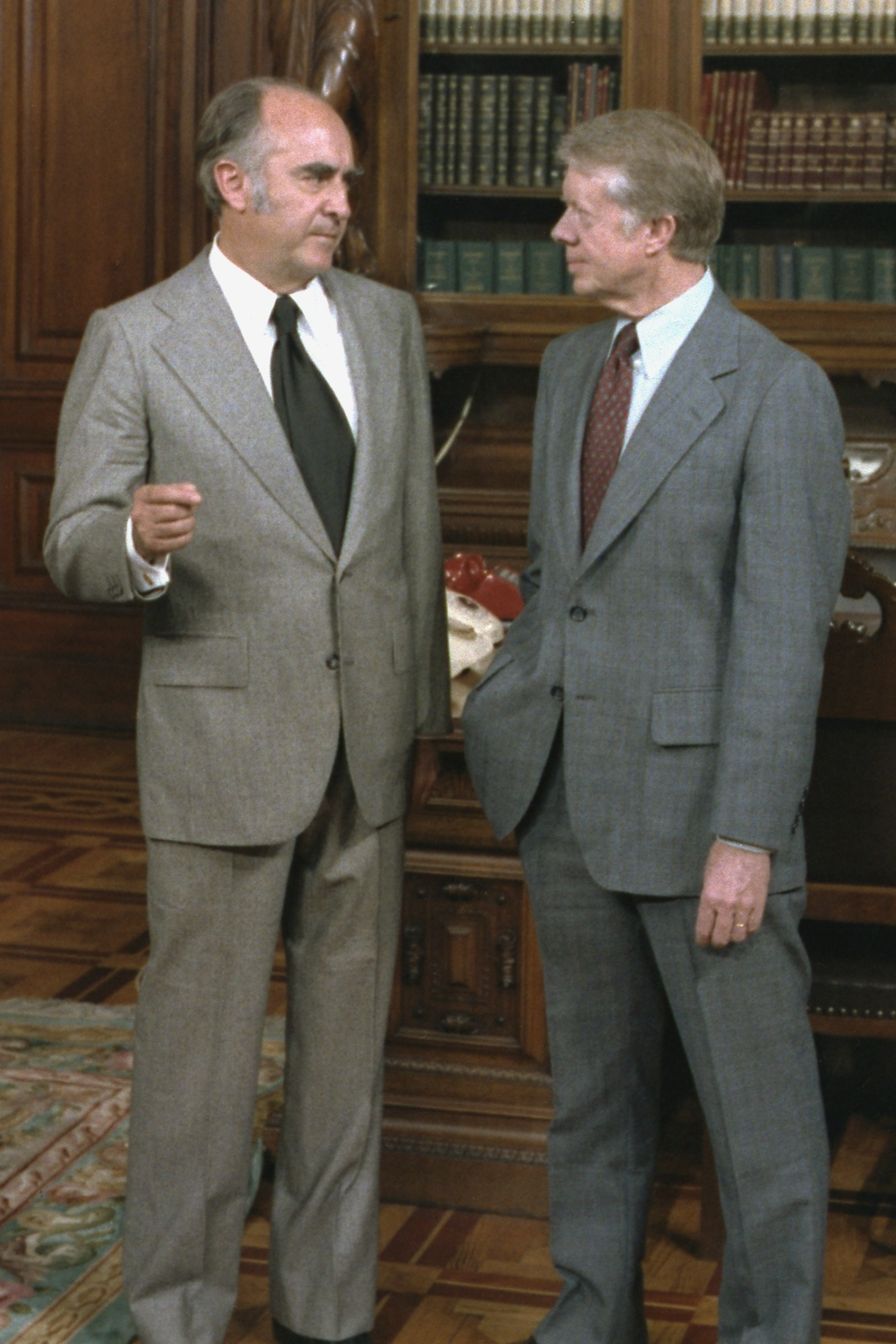
José López Portillo and U.S. President Jimmy Carter at the Mexican National Palace presidential office in 1979.

In the year leading to the end of his term as president on 1 December 1982, López Portillo personally chose two candidates as possibilities to replace himself, following the succession ritual established by his party. One, Javier García Paniagua, would have been appointed if a man of greater political skill were needed. The other, ultimately his successor, was Miguel de la Madrid, who was chosen for his financial and administrative skills, which were deemed much more necessary after the devaluation of the peso in February 1982 and the subsequent economic crisis.

On 1 September 1982, at his final annual Address to the Congress ("Informe de Gobierno"), López Portillo gave a famous speech where he condemned businessmen and bankers responsible for capital flight, claimed that the crisis was not his fault ("I'm responsible for the helm, but the storm is not my fault"), announced the nationalization of the banks ("They have looted us, but Mexico is not finished, they won't loot us again!"), and asked for forgiveness for his mistakes as president and the economic crisis. He famously broke into tears during his speech after asking for the forgiveness of Mexico's poor. This passionate speech, however, did little to repair his image, and he remains one of the most unpopular Mexican presidents in recent history.

López Portillo was the last economic nationalist president to emerge from the ranks of the Institutional Revolutionary Party. Subsequent presidents supported free trade (librecambismo).

== Personal life and death ==
López Portillo's first wife was Carmen Romano. After leaving the presidency, López Portillo divorced Romano and married in 1995 his longtime partner, the Yugoslavian-born actress Sasha Montenegro. They had two children (Nabila and Alejandro) but later separated.

He was the brother of late Mexican novelist Margarita López Portillo, who died on 8 May 2006, of natural causes.

He died in Mexico City when he was 83 years old. He was the victim of a cardiac complication generated by pneumonia. He was buried at the Mexico City Military Cemetery.

== Public image and opinion ==
In a national survey conducted in 2012, 25% of respondents considered that the López Portillo administration was "very good" or "good", 17% responded that it was an "average" administration, and 44% responded that it was a "very bad" or "bad" administration.

== Works ==
- Génesis y teoría del Estado moderno (1965).
- Quetzalcóatl (1965).
- Don Q (1975, reimpresiones en 1976 y 1987).
- Ellos vienen... La conquista de México (1987).
- Mis tiempos (2 volumes, 1988).
- Umbrales (1997).
- El súper PRI (2002).

== Honours ==
- Knight-Collar of the Order of Boyaca, Colombia (1979)
- Knight-Collar of the Order of Isabella the Catholic, Spain (1977-10-07)
- Knight-Collar of the Order of Charles III, Spain (1978)
- Knight of the Royal Order of the Seraphim, Sweden (1980-05-05)

== See also ==
- List of heads of state of Mexico

== Notes ==
Government offices
Preceded by Guillermo Villarreal Caravantes	Director of the Federal Electricity Commission; 1972–1973	Succeeded by Arsenio Farell Cubillas
Political offices
Preceded by Hugo B. Margáin	Secretary of Finance and Public Credit; 1973–1975	Succeeded by Mario Ramón Beteta
Preceded by Luis Echeverría	President of Mexico; 1976–1982	Succeeded by Miguel de la Madrid
Party political offices
Preceded by Luis Echeverría Álvarez	PRI nominee for President of Mexico; 1976 (won)	Succeeded by Miguel de la Madrid
