= Pastor Velázquez =

Mexican painter (1895–1960)

Pastor Pedro Velázquez Hernández (April 28, 1895 – December 26, 1960) was a watercolor painter praised for his technique and beauty in all his works in the genres of landscape, portraiture and still life, with successful exhibitions in San Francisco and New York, in the United States. He also had success in the first biennial of Barcelona, Spain. He is recognized for being the creator of the coat of arms of the State of New Mexico.
