= José López Portillo y Rojas =

Mexican politician (1850–1923)

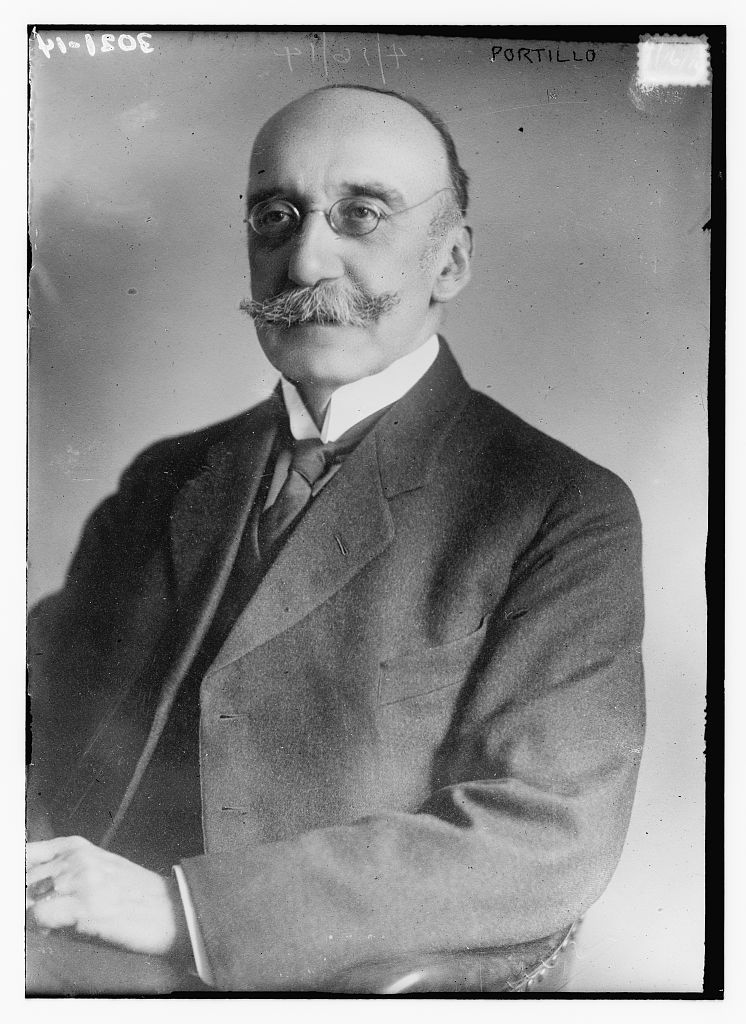

Governor of Jalisco
- In office October 23, 1912 – February 10, 1914
- Preceded by: Alberto Robles Gil
- Succeeded by: José M. Mier

Secretary of Foreign Affairs of Mexico
- In office February 17, 1914 – July 10, 1914
- President: Victoriano Huerta
- Preceded by: Querido Moheno
- Succeeded by: Francisco S. Carvajal

Personal details
- Born: May 26, 1850 Guadalajara, Jalisco
- Died: May 26, 1923 (aged 73) Mexico DF
- Relations: José López Portillo y Pacheco (grandson)
- Profession: lawyer, politician

José López Portillo y Rojas (May 26, 1850 – May 22, 1923), born in Guadalajara, Jalisco, was a Mexican lawyer, politician and man of letters. He served as Governor of Jalisco in 1911 and as Secretary of Foreign Affairs in 1914 for coup leader and brief Mexican President Victoriano Huerta, during the United States occupation of Veracruz. He served as Director of the Mexican Academy of Language from 1916 to 1923.

Rojas was an advocate of animal welfare and was vice-president of the Mexican Humane Association. He was well known for his opposition to bull fighting.

His grandson José López Portillo y Pacheco, was the president of Mexico from 1976 to 1982.

== Selected publications ==
- Novels

La Parcela (1898)
Los Precursores (1909)
Fuertes y débiles (1919)
La Horma de Su Zapato

- Essays and stories

Seis Leyendas (1883)
Novelas Cortas (1900)
Sucesos y Novelas Cortas (1903)
Historias, Historietas y Cuentecillos (1918)
