= History of the Jews in Mexico =

Mexican Jews
Judíos mexicanos יהודים מקסיקניים

Total population
- 67,476 self-identified Jews (2010 census)

Regions with significant populations
- Mexico City Metropolitan Area

Languages
- Mexican Spanish, Hebrew, Yiddish, Judaeo-Spanish

Religion
- Judaism

Related ethnic groups
- Jewish diaspora, Israeli diaspora

The history of the Jews in Mexico began in 1519 with the arrival of Conversos, often called Marranos or "Crypto-Jews", referring to those Jews forcibly converted to Catholicism and that then became subject to the Spanish Inquisition.

During the period of the Viceroyalty of New Spain (1521–1821), a number of Jews came to Mexico, especially during the period of the Iberian Union (1580–1640), when Spain and Portugal were ruled by the same monarch. That political circumstance allowed freer movement by Portuguese crypto-Jewish merchants into Spanish America. When the Portuguese regained their independence from Spain in 1640, Portuguese merchants in New Spain were prosecuted by the Mexican Inquisition. When the monopoly of the Roman Catholic Church in Mexico was replaced with religious toleration during the nineteenth-century Liberal reform, Jews could openly immigrate to Mexico. They came from Europe and later from the crumbling Ottoman Empire, including Syria, until the first half of the 20th century.

Today, most Jews in Mexico are descendants of this immigration and still divided by diasporic origin, principally Yiddish-speaking Ashkenazim and Judaeo-Spanish-speaking Sephardim. It is an insular community with its own religious, social, and cultural institutions, mostly in Mexico City, Monterrey and Guadalajara.

== History ==
=== Viceroyalty of New Spain ===
Jews and Conversos were part of the conquest and colonization in Mexico, and key participants in the transatlantic and transpacific trade networks, as well as the development of domestic trade. Conversos accompanied Hernán Cortés in 1519. These were members of Jewish families which had been forcibly converted to Christianity to avoid expulsion from Spain after the reconquest of the Iberian Peninsula from the Moors. The reconquest was followed by the Spanish Inquisition, which made the Conversos one of its targets with accusations of reverting to Judaism. During this time, there were two types of Conversos: Crypto-Jews and Jews who fully converted to Catholicism. The Jews who converted were used to report Crypto-Jews to the Catholic Church, and consequently, they were awarded with high-power positions within the Catholic Church. Furthermore, during this time, the Catholic Church was responsible for social welfare and was the most powerful entity. Converso migration to the new Spanish colony began in 1530 after most of the violence from the conquest of the Aztec Empire had subsided, and the Spanish Inquisition continued. For several decades, the families lived peacefully, integrating into Mexico's elite, with some becoming prominent Catholic clergy and others returning to Jewish practice.

David L. Nathan proposed that the first coins minted in the Western Hemisphere by Spanish Conquistadors in Mexico City feature a Hebrew letter aleph (א), suggesting evidence for a Jewish presence or influence in Mexico in 1536. He notes that nearly all of the dies prepared under the tenure of the first assayer use the purported aleph symbol in place of the Christian cross potent mark, found almost universally on medieval Spanish and Mexican coinage. Nathan goes on to consider possible Jewish family connections to the known early Mexican mint workers.

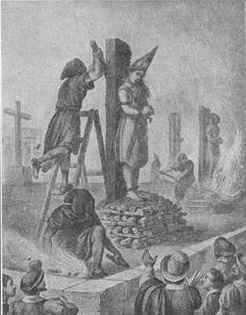
Execution of Mariana de Carabajal, daughter of Francisca Nuñez de Carabajal, in 1601

The persecution of Jews came to New Spain along with the conquistadors. Bernal Díaz del Castillo described in his writings various executions of soldiers during the conquest of Mexico because they were accused of being practicing Jews, including Hernando Alonso, who built the boats Cortés used to assault Tenochtitlán. However, the Mexican Inquisition was not fully established until 1571, when it became a threat to Converso and Jewish communities with an initial purge of them from 1585 to 1601. In 1606, Mexico received an order by the King of Spain to free Conversos in Inquisition prisons. This relaxing of the Inquisition in Mexico, which was never as severe as in Spain, allowed more to come over in the first half of the 17th century. New Conversos settled in Mexico City, Acapulco, Veracruz and Campeche, as these cities offered the most opportunities for mercantile activity. Some did move to the more-outlying areas, such as Zacatecas, but they still afforded more opportunities than places farther north. There was a second Inquisition persecution of Conversos from 1642 to 1649. Then, the focus shifted to matters such as blasphemy and moral infractions. However, during the entire colonial period, practicing Jews in Spain or elsewhere could not enter Spanish colonial territory.

One notable episode during the colonial period was the establishment of the New Kingdom of León. In 1567, the Carvajal family arrived in New Spain under nobleman Luis de Carabajal y Cueva. With the exception of him and a cousin, the family was Crypto-Jewish. In 1579, Carvajal was granted land in what is now northeastern Mexico, just north of what was then considered New Spain. The area welcomed both Conversos and practicing Jews, with about 75% of the initial settlers being secretly Jewish. Some theories state that Monterrey developed as a commercial center despite its colonial era remoteness because of Crypto-Jewish influence. However, Luis de Carvajal and members of his family were persecuted in 1589 for practicing Judaism. De Carvajal's nephew, Luis de Carvajal the Younger, kept memoirs detailing his life and persecution; these are now considered to be the earliest writings by a Jew in the Americas. The auto-da-fé of Mariana Carvajal has become part of Mexican art and literature. By 1641, the colony had grown, and some of the settlers would later move to establish new settlements in Coahuila, Texas, and New Santander.

The largest number of prosecutions by the Mexican Inquisition occurred in the wake of the 1640 dissolution of the Iberian Union, when Spain and Portugal had been ruled by the same monarch. Portuguese merchants more easily entered Spanish America, and a complex community of crypto-Jews emerged, connected to transatlantic and trans-Pacific trade networks. Evidence from individual cases prosecuted by the Mexican Inquisition indicates that most crypto-Jews in Mexico or their parents had been born in Portugal, primarily from the Portuguese capital, Lisbon, or from Castelo Branco. There were a few very wealthy Portuguese merchants, who were leaders of the community, but most were shopkeepers and artisans. A prominent merchant was Simón Váez, whom the Inquisition accused of allowing his house to serve as a synagogue until the 1642 persecutions began. He had risen from humble circumstances, but he and other wealthy merchants came to socialize with crown officials and to play a prominent role among the elite. Their wealth was based on asientos (licenses) for the black slave trade in Mexico since Portugal controlled the African coast, where they were sourced. Portuguese merchants also held contracts for tax farming and supplying the Spanish fleet and forts with stores and munitions.

=== Post-Independence immigration ===
After Mexico gained its Independence, it abolished the Inquisition, but the Catholic religion was declared the official religion. The remaining Crypto-Jews still did not openly admit to their Jewish identity but began to observe various Jewish rituals, and from 1825 to 1860, a few European Jews from Germany and Eastern Europe arrived. The immigrants were not allowed to become Mexican citizens, but their main challenges to living in Mexico were economic, rather than social or religious. In 1861, a group rented a hall to celebrate Rosh Hashanah and Yom Kippur, the first recorded instance of public Jewish worship. In 1865, Maximilian I of Mexico issued an edict of religious tolerance, with representatives from Jewish organizations in Europe and the United States coming to Mexico to explore the possibilities for immigration. From 1864 to 1867, Maximilian invited some European Jews from France, Belgium, and Austria-Hungary to settle in Mexico. By 1867, only twenty Jewish families were living in Mexico, with about a dozen more elsewhere.

During the Reform War, the Liberals under Benito Juárez reinforced freedom of religion, allowing those Jews who arrived after that time Mexican citizenship and full integration. In the 1880s, a significant wave of Jewish immigration began as the Mexican government invited a number of Jewish bankers to operate in the country, and the assassination of Czar Alexander II in Russia pushed Jews to leave the country. The Jews settled in Mexico City and in various other areas of the country, including rural areas, often as traveling salesmen. About half of Mexico's Jewish population can be linked to this wave of immigration. Another group of Jews that came at this time were industrialists from France. However, many of the French arrivals were not interested in staying permanently and returned after making their fortunes in Mexico. However, a few married and stayed, leaving behind in Mexico City last names such as Herzog, Scherer, and Levy.

Jewish immigrants in Mexico City eventually built businesses such as a haberdashery on Madero Street that was a center of European fashion and La Esmeralda jewelry store (now the Museo del Estanquillo) with a reputation similar to Tiffany's on the corner of Isabel la Católica and Madero. The Jewish owner of El Salon Rojo, one of the capital's first movie houses, helped to develop the country's first Jewish cemetery.

During the very late 19th century into the 20th, Sephardic and Middle Eastern Jews also began arriving from what is now Syria and the rest of the crumbling Ottoman Empire, forming the Maguén David and Monte Sinaí communities. These, with those still coming from Eastern Europe, were usually poorer, shoemakers, furriers, peddlers, and tailors, who first lived in cities such as Puebla, Veracruz, and Chiapas before migrating to Mexico City. For the Sephardic Jews, similar language and culture made it easier for them to adapt.

In 1900, the Mexican census counted 134 Jews in the country. From then until 1950, an estimated 7,300 Jewish people immigrated to Mexico from Eastern Europe, 2,640 from Spain or the former Ottoman Empire, and 1,620 from Cuba and the United States. These various Jewish groups formed their own religious congregations and social institutions. Turkish Jews began holding open religious services in 1901 and founded the first Talmud Torah in 1905, as an educational institution for boys. Ashkenazi Jews began holding open services as early as 1904. The first formal Jewish organization in Mexico, the Monte Sinaí community, was founded in 1912.

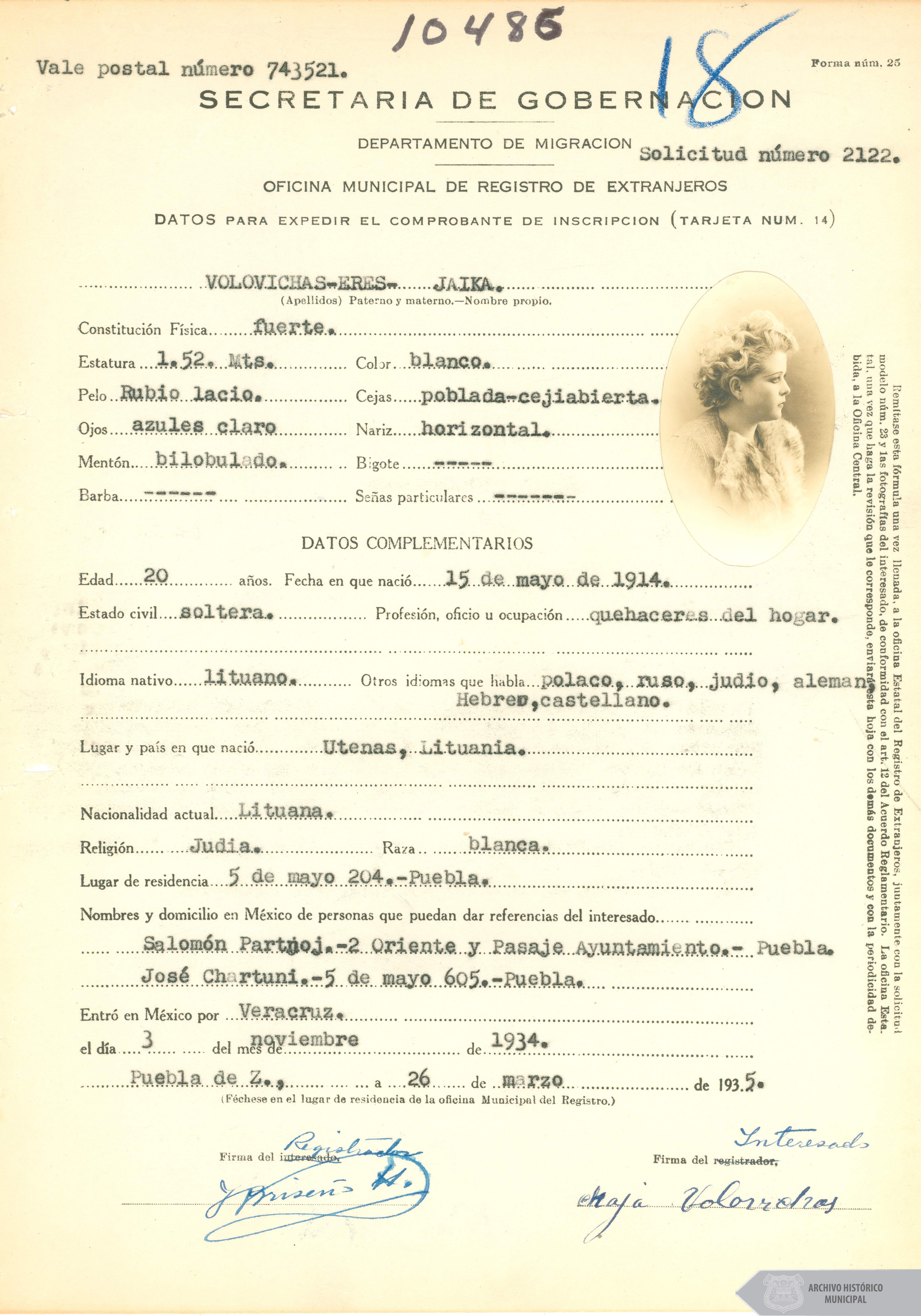
Immigrant registration form of a Jewish Lithuanian woman who emigrated to Mexico in 1934

During the Mexican Revolution, many foreigners, including Jews, left the country, but immediately after, Jews began to arrive in substantial numbers again. Between 1917 and 1920 they began to come from Russia, Poland, Lithuania, the Balkans and the Middle East. The rate increased in 1921, when the United States imposed immigration quotas. Ten thousand arrived from Eastern Europe to the port of Veracruz at the invitation of President Plutarco Elías Calles. Jewish organizations such as the Comité de Damas and North American B'nai B'rith were formed to help the new arrivals adapt. In the 1920s, the Jewish community grew and prospered in Mexico. The immigration rate slowed after 1929 because of the Great Depression and new immigration policies which favored those with a more similar ethnic and religious background to that of Mexico.

Most of the Jewish communities' social and religious organizations were formally founded in the first half of the 20th century. These include the Sociedad Beneficiencia Alianza Monte Sinaí (1912), the Young Men's Hebrew Association in Mexico City. (1917), the first K’tav or Jewish religious school (1917), the first federally recognized synagogue under the terms of the Constitution of 1917 (1918), the Talmud Torá Hatihiá (1919), the Congregación Nidje Israel for Ashkenazi Jews (1922), the first Zionist organization (1922), the first Ashkenazi religious school (1922), the Asociación Cultural IL Peretz Farein, later called the Idisher Kultur Guezelshaft (1922), the Har Sinaé synagogue for the Damascus Jewish community, (1923), the first Keren Hayeson or campaign for the National Fund for Palestine (1923), the Centro Israelita and first synagogue in Monterrey (1923), the Colegio Israelita de México (1924), the Agudat Ajim community in Guadalajara (1923), the Bnej Kedem Sephardic community Center (1926), the Nidje Israel Ashkenazi cemetery (1929), the Cámara Israelita de Industria y Comerico in Méxicoand the Unión de Literatos y Artistas Judíos (1931), the Federación de Sociedades Israelitas de México (1932), the Colegio Israelita Hatikva in Monterrey (1932), B'nai B'rith (1934), the Sociedad de Beneficiencia Sdadá Umarpé for the Aleppo Jewish community, today the Comunidad Maguén David (1938) and the first Zionist convention (1938) . In addition various newspapers and other periodicals were established in various languages such as Mexicanisher Idish Leben (Yiddish, 1927), Der Veg (Yiddish with Spanish section, 1929), Di shtime (Yiddish, 1935) and La Verdad (Spanish, 1936). The first printing press for the Hebrew alphabet was brought to Mexico in 1930.

The Jewish population in Mexico was estimated at 21,000 in 1930. From then until the 1940s, the Jews who arrived were those fleeing the Nazis, but this immigration was not as large as in previous decades, as most of those who arrived were those who already had family and friends in the country.

Despite its strong Catholic identity and history of the Inquisition, there has been little intolerance or resistance to Jewish immigration into Mexico. While the Catholic Church did not welcome Jewish immigration in the 19th century, it was still struggling against the government restrictions and saw growing Protestantism as a greater threat than that of the Jewish community. Over the 20th century, the Mexican Catholic Church lost its opposition to the Jewish presence. The only recorded incidents of significant antisemitism came in the 1930s during economic depression. Mexican labor unions pressured the government to restrict Chinese and Jewish immigration. In May 1931, 250 Jewish merchants were expelled from the La Lagunilla Market in Mexico City. In the late 1930s, some anti-Jewish demonstrations erupted, mostly by Nazi supporters financed by Berlin. In 1937, an immigrant quota system was initiated, which restricted immigration from certain countries such as Poland to 100 people per year, shutting out many Jewish would-be-immigrants. However, at the same time the Mexican government allowed for some immigration of refugees, for example looking the other way when 200 Jews from Cuba entered the country illegally under the government of Lázaro Cárdenas.

The Mexican government deported 21 stateless Jews in late 1938 and had decreed that stateless male refugees must commit to marrying indigenous women in order to create mestizo families.

=== 20th century institutions and integration ===
Jewish religious and social institutions coalesced and grew in the mid 20th century with the Centro Cultural Israelita (1941), the Comité Central Israelita legally recognized to represent the Jewish community (1942), the Unión Sefaradí receiving official recognition (1943), the founding of the Comité Unido de Antidifamación (1943), the formation of the Comité Unido de Tribuna Israelita by the Comité Central Israelita and the Logia Mexicana del B'nai B'rith (1944), the founding of the Unión Israelita Maguén David in Tijuana (1946), the Centro Cultural México Israel (1947), the Colegio Israelita de Guadalajara (1949), the Centro Deportivo Israelita (1950), the Beth Israel Community Center for English speakers (1957) and the Nidje Israel Temple in Acapulco Street in Mexico City (1965).

In 1987, the Tribuna Israelita, along with Universidad Nacional Autónoma de Mexico (UNAM), began a series of cultural presentations about Judaism in Mexico. However, little attention was paid to the history of Jews in Mexico until the 1990s. In 1992, a study of Jewish communities in Mexico was published by UNAM in collaboration with the Tribuna Israelita and the Comité Central Israelita de México, called Imágenes de un Encuentro: La Presencia Judía en México Durante La Primera Mitad del Siglo XX (Images of an Encounter: The Jewish Presence in Mexico during the First Half of the 20th Century), which received the CANIEM Prize in 1993. It depicts Mexican Jews as well integrated into Mexican society but with more observance of religion in everyday life than most other Jews of the Diaspora. In 1995, Tribuna Israelita co-sponsored Las Jornadas Contra del Racismo along with the Secretaría de Educación Pública and other organizations.

=== 21st century and modern immigration ===
In the 21st century, the National Institute of Anthropology and History has made significant discoveries of colonial Crypto-Jewish heritage. Including the identification and restoration of the mikveh of Juliantla, Guerrero. Dated to the late 16th century, this is the oldest mikveh in the Americas. In 2017, the Mexican Consulate in New York City recovered the Carvajal Manuscript, the oldest known work by a Jewish author in the Americas, after it was stolen from the National Archives in 1932.

There has not been a new wave of Jewish immigration from the Old World to Mexico in the 21st century, instead small numbers of Jews have arrived as part of larger general migrations from Latin American countries. In 2021, construction began on the Ciudad de la Torá in Ixtapan de la Sal, a planned community aimed at attracting Haredi Jews from within Mexico as well as immigrants from Latin America.

As of the September 2019 deadline, there had been more than 33,000 Mexican applications for Spanish citizenship through a 2015 program aimed at the descendants of the Jewish expulsions from Spain. By October 2019, only 8,128 applicants had been processed, of which 815 were granted Spanish citizenship. In early 2021, former President of Mexico (1988–1994) Carlos Salinas de Gortari obtained Spanish citizenship through this program.

In 2018, Claudia Sheinbaum became the first Jewish person and first elected woman (second after interim Rosario Robles) to be the Head of Government of Mexico City. In 2023, she resigned her position in order to launch her candidacy for the presidency in the 2024 election. In June 2024, she was elected President of Mexico, becoming the first woman and the first person of predominantly Jewish heritage to hold the office. (Note: Carlos Salinas de Gortari, president of Mexico from 1988 to 1994, is of partial colonial-era Sephardic Jewish descent.)

== Jewish communities in Mexico ==
The current Jewish population in Mexico mostly consists of those who have descended from immigrants from the 19th and early 20th centuries with nationwide totals estimated between 90,000 and 100,000, about 75% of whom are in Mexico City. The exact numbers are not known. One main source for figures is the Comité Central Israelita in Mexico City but its contact is limited to Orthodox and Conservative congregations with no contact with Jews that may be affiliated with the Reform movement or those who consider themselves secular. The Mexican government census lists religion but its categories are confusing, confusing those of some Protestant sects which practice Judaic rituals with Jewish groups. There is also controversy as to whether to count those Crypto-Jews who have converted (back) to Judaism. Sixty two percent of the population over fifteen is married, three percent divorced and four percent widowed. However, younger Jewish women are more likely to be employed outside the home (only 18% of women are housewives) and fertility rates are dropping from 3.5 children of women over 65 to 2.7 for the overall population now. There is a low level of intermarriage with the general Mexican population, with only 3.1% of marriages being mixed. Although the Jewish community is less than one percent of Mexico's total population, Mexico is one of the few countries whose Jewish population is expected to grow.

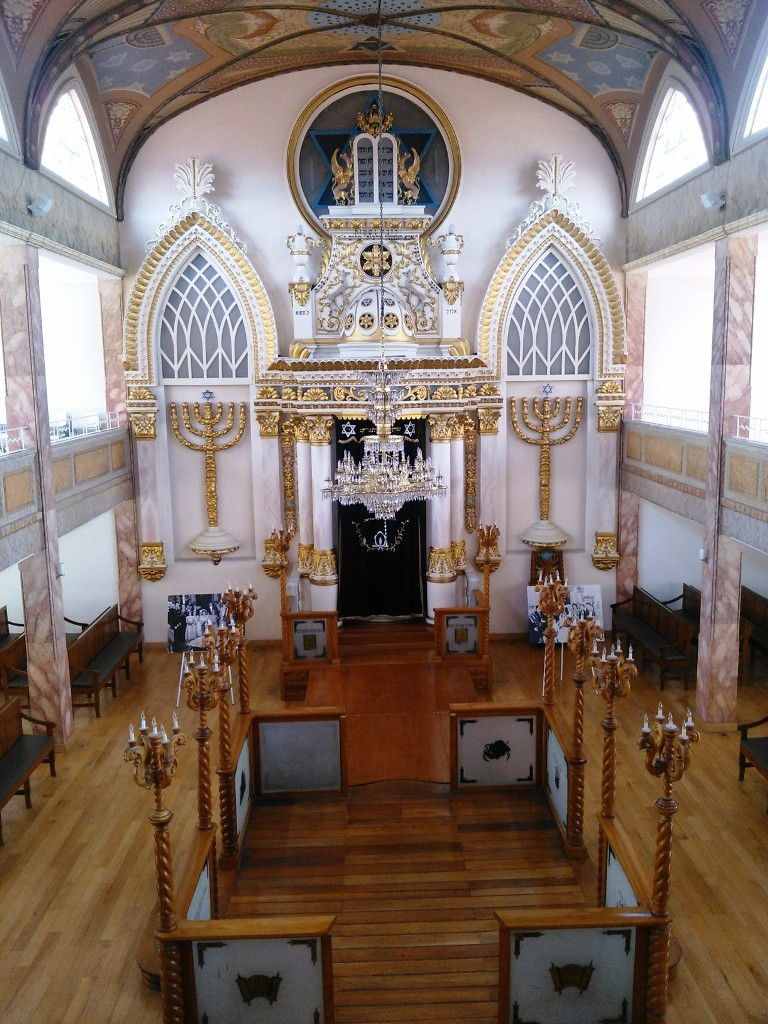
Interior of the Historic Synagogue Justo Sierra 71 located in the Historic Center of Mexico City

The Mexican Jewish community has strong roots in Mexico and has few problems in the country. Openly Jewish people serve prominently in government positions and are found in most spheres of Mexico's business, intellectual and artistic communities. One U.S. born Jew by the name of Sidney Franklin became a popular bullfighter in the early 1920s. There are occasional clashes between the Jewish community and others in Mexico but these are generally solved peacefully. There is an Interfaith Council to help with these issues. While the Catholic Church is dominant both religiously and culturally, it does not suppress the worship or other activities of other religious groups. The only challenges the community faces are intermarriage and migration out of the country. However, Latin American popular culture can resent apparent Jewish economic success, with the community associated with international capital and international influence.

Jews in Mexico are less united than those in the United States and Canada. Among those descended from immigrants, social divisions remain, based on place of origin despite unification efforts. Those from Aleppo, Damascus and the Balkans and Eastern Europe have their own synagogues and other institutions. However, the main split is between the Ashkenazim from Russia, Poland, Germany and other parts of Europe from the Sephardim, mostly from Italy and the former Ottoman Empire. The Ashkenazim subdivide among political and ideological axes and tend to be more liberal and secular. They founded several newspapers and other publications such as Mexikaner Idish Lebn, Radikaler Arbeter Tzenter, Unzer Lebn and others to express these different views. The Sephardim tend to be more patriarchal, less well educated and more religiously observant. Those from Syria are further subdivided into Halebis or Maguen David from Aleppo and the Shamis or Monte Sinai from Damascus.

Despite ethnic identification all identify as Mexican as well, seeing the two as complementary rather than conflicting. Literature written by Mexican and other Latin American Jewish writers tend to explore the question of what it means to be a Jew in the region. These authors include Sonia Chocron, Alicia Freilich de Segal, Jacqueline Goldberg, Martha Kornblith, Elisa Lerner and Blanca Strepponi. Author Rosa Nissan has written a number of books related to growing up Jewish in Mexico include Novia que te vea and its sequel Hisho que te Nazca.

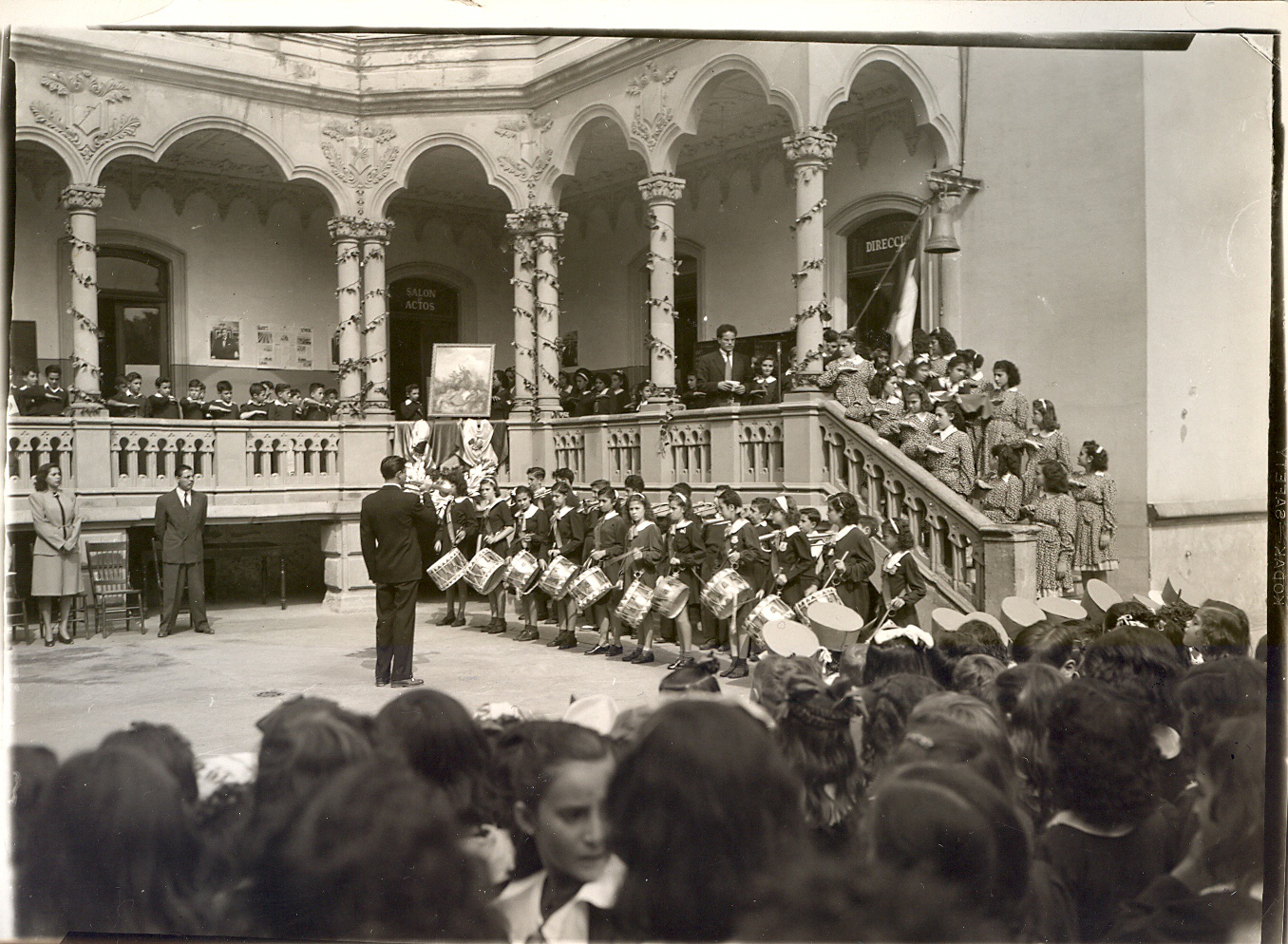
The Hebreo Monte Sinaí School at its former location on 120 Zacatecas Street, Colonia Roma, Mexico City (the building now houses the University of Communication)

During the early 20th century, Jewish immigrants started a large number of religious and social organizations to help the community adapt to life in Mexico and conserve their heritage. On Tacuba Street in the historic center of Mexico City there is a building called the Palacio de Mármol (Marble Palace). The site was originally part of a convent, but later it was subdivided and a French style mansion built in the late 19th century. After World War I, it became an important Jewish community center, active for nearly two decades. At first, it worked to help newly arrived Jews settle in Mexico, but it was also a social and educational center. Today, there are ten main organizations to which most of Mexican Jewry is affiliated. The Beth Israel Community Center is an organization that caters to the English-speaking community that practices Conservative Judaism. The Jewish Sport Center is a neutral meeting place open to all sectors of the Jewish community as sports, culture and social institution with a membership of about 19,000. The Monterrey Community Center is the main organization for this northern city. The North Baja California Community Center served the Tijuana Jewish community. The Ashkenazai Community served the descendants of those who immigrated from Eastern Europe. The Bet El Community is a Conservative organization. The Guadalajara Community Center is for those who live in that city. The Maguen David Community was formed by descendants of immigrants from Aleppo, Syria. The Alianza Monte Sinaí was formed by descendants from Damascus, Syria and the Sephardic Community was formed by descendants of immigrants from the Balkans. There are a number of women's organizations, which mostly focus on humanitarian issues both inside and outside the Jewish community. Women also run most of the educational institutions.

The Jewish Central Committee of Mexico was formed in 1938 as a response to the situation for European Jews at that time. At first, its function was to help Jews escape from the Nazis but later became an umbrella organization for the various Jewish communities in Mexico. It also acts as a representative body for all Jews in Mexico with the Mexican government and other Jewish communities outside of Mexico such as the World Jewish Congress. The Tribuna Israelita is a part of this organization, whose purpose is to work with other agencies to promote understanding of Jewry in Mexico including publications and also works to influence public opinion about anti-Semitism. Another sub organization is the Mexican Council of Jewish Women, which mostly works on projects related to education and health.

The Mexican Jewish immigrant community has been described as closed and separate from the rest of Mexican society. About ninety percent of Mexican Jews attend Jewish schools and marry within the faith. There are Scouting and Zionist organizations for Jewish youth. Most who attend Mexican universities belong to the Mexican Federation of Jewish Students (FEMUJ) . However, there have been outreach efforts. In 2009, Alan Grabinsky and Paul Feldmen established a Moishe House in the Condesa neighborhood, one of only two in Latin America. The idea is to create a social center for young Jews outside of the western suburbs of Mexico City to make the Jewish community less isolated from the rest of Mexican society. The Mexico International Jewish Film Festival attracts a mostly non-Jewish audience and has expanded from Mexico City to Guadalajara, Monterrey and Cancún. A radio show on Jewish topics called El Aleph has a mostly non Jewish following. Tribuna Israelita organizes programs at private universities to increase public understanding of Israel and Judaism. Other Jewish social organizations include the Mexican Association of Friends for academic projects, ORT which works to implement technologies in Mexican high schools, Retorno to combat alcohol and drug abuse and Kadima, which works on issues related to the disabled.

=== Jewish neighborhoods of Mexico City ===
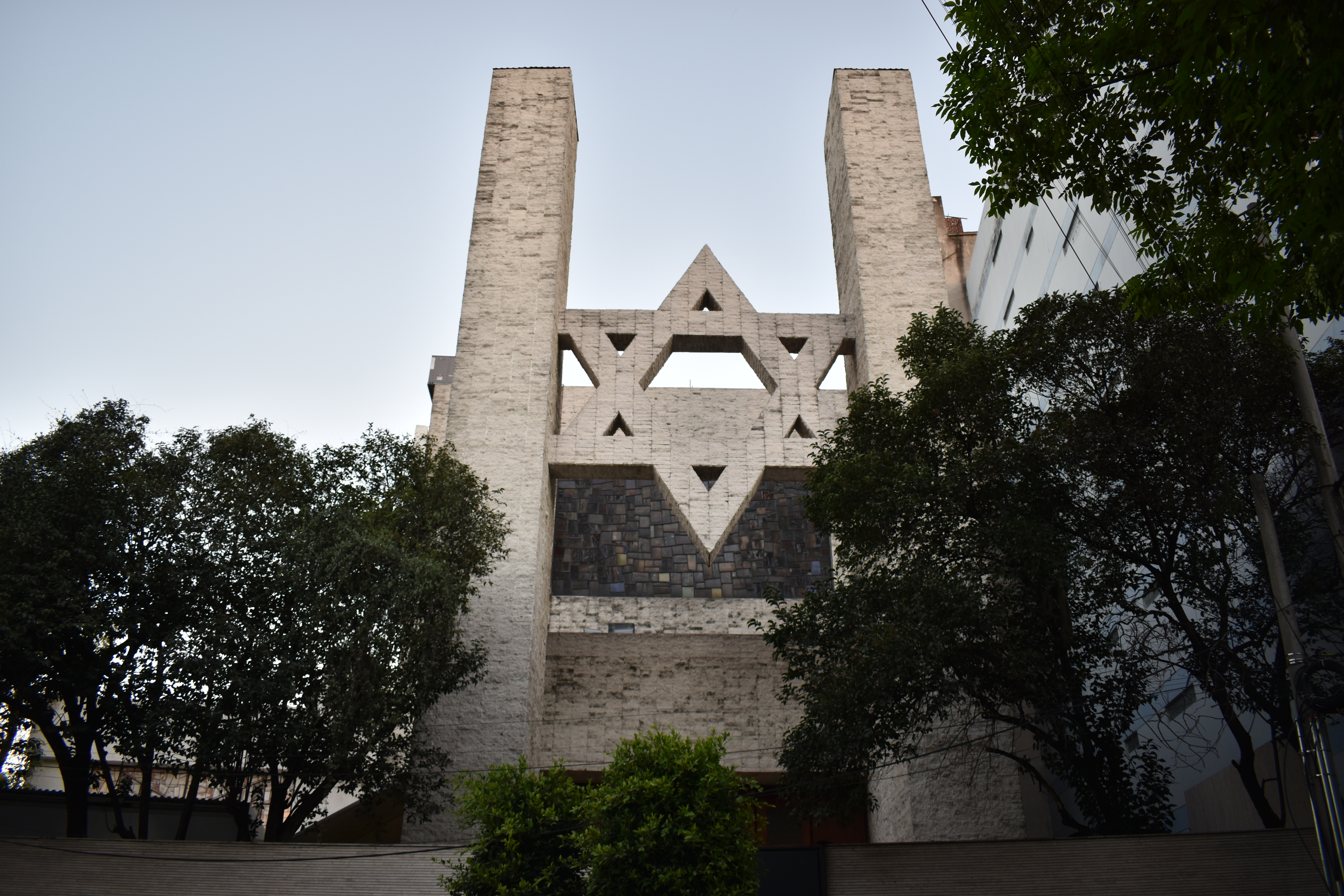
Synagogue in Polanco

In Greater Mexico City, notable communities exist in Colonia Hipódromo Condesa, Polanco, Lomas de Chapultepec, Santa Fe and Huixquilucan, State of Mexico . Of the sixteen Jewish schools, about a dozen of those are in Mexico City, which also has over two dozen synagogues.

In the 1920s, the Jewish community in Mexico City still centered in the Historic Downtown northeast of the Zócalo around Jesús María street, "the equivalent of Delancey Street" in New York, according to author Ilan Stavans. In the 1930s and 1940s many Jewish residents moved to the leafy streetcar suburbs of Roma and Condesa, where Yiddish was the unofficial language of Parque México, the local park. Today, in the area, there is a Jewish museum, archives, synagogue, and kosher deli at Acapulco Street #70, several more small orthodox synagogues hidden inside houses on Amsterdam Avenue, and another synagogue at the corner of Montes de Oca and Parral streets. In the 1950s, 60s, and 70s, Jews moved further west to Polanco, Lomas de Chapultepec, Interlomas, Bosques de las Lomas, and Tecamachalco, where the majority are now based.

== Crypto-Jewish resurgence ==
The Inquisition in Mexico succeeded in eliminating all practices of colonial-era Judaism in Mexico; however, cultural vestiges remain in the form of syncretic religious rituals and blended cuisine.

Additionally, some Mexican Mestizos have significant genetic contribution from Sephardic Jews. A 2018 study published in Nature found that 297 Mexicans (from the 1288 Mexican individuals studied) had more than 5% genetic markers matching the "Sephardic/East/South Mediterranean" grouping. Specifically for markers matching likely Sephardic ancestry, the median for the 297 individuals was around 3% and the third quartile was around 11%. The average contribution of "Sephardic/East/South Mediterranean" ancestry in Latin America is higher than the Iberian Peninsula, suggesting a larger migration of Christian converts (from Judaism and Islam) than indicated by historical records.

While the Crypto-Jews were assimilated into the general populace, there are families in Mexico and the southwest United States that practice what appear to be Jewish rituals and customs, knowing or not knowing where these come from. For those claiming direct Crypto-Jewish heritage, one or more of three lines of evidence are usually presented: the existence of Jewish rituals in the family, the existence of Inquisition records with Jewish family names, and the oral history of the family. It also generally includes strong secrecy about family history and rituals. For some descendants, the discovery of Crypto-Jewish heritage leads them to reclaiming all or some of the Sephardic Jewish faith, often by adopting a number of rituals and customs.

In 1880, Bonifacio Laureano Moyar worked to identify and organize the descendants of Conversos, or Crypto-Jews, to restore full Jewish intending to restore efforts led to the establishment in 1920 of the Kahal Kadosh Bnej Elohim in Venta Prieta, Hidalgo (since 1930 the location of the Jewish Community of Venta Prieta). There is also a small community of Converso descendants practicing Judaism in the Vallejo neighborhood of Mexico City, but the main immigrant Jewish organizations do not recognize them.

Efforts to find Jewish descendants have continued. Texas rabbi Samuel S. Lerer, influenced by the Venta Prieta experience, began working with those of Jewish heritage starting in 1968, mostly working in Veracruz and Puebla. A number of these converts have migrated to Israel. Starting in the 1990s, a group called Kulanu, a Hebrew word meaning "all of us", began exploring other aspects of Judaism, such as Jewish ancestry in Mexico, especially that of the Conversos. They have sought out descendants of Conversos, without permission of the Chief Rabbinate of Israel, and converted them to Judaism. They have not only worked with those who know of their Jewish ancestry, but also have reached out to families who observe certain Jewish rituals, such as separating meat and dairy, without knowing why. Although Kulanu is based in the United States, it has worked in Mexico to have these converts recognized by other Jewish communities in Mexico.

However, there has been resistance to these efforts for various reasons. First is that many of those descended from Jewish ancestry do not want to abandon the Catholic faith. The goal of finding and converting Crypto-Jews is controversial. Established immigrant Jewish communities are resistant because they do not want problems from the Catholic majority and because Orthodox Jews, the dominant group in Mexico, do not proselytize. They insist that only those of a Jewish mother are Jewish. The Jewish committee's numbers do not include converts of Crypto-Jews as the two groups do not have contact.

In addition to Crypto-Jews in modern Mexico, the history of colonial Mexico includes claims by families in the Southwest United States to be descended from Sephardic Jews who escaped the Mexican Inquisition, with some linking them to the Crypto-Jewish settlers of the New Kingdom of León.

== See also ==
- Festival of Santa Esterica
- Gilberto Bosques Saldívar
- History of the Jews in Latin America
- Lev Tahor
- Limpieza de sangre
- List of Mexican Jews
- New Christian
- Old Christian
