= List of Mexican Jews =

Mexico has had a Jewish population since the early Colonial Era. However, these early individuals could not openly worship as they were persecuted by the Spanish Inquisition for practicing Judaism. After achieving independence, Mexico eventually adopted freedom of religion and began receiving Jewish immigrants, many of them refugees. The book Estudio histórico de la migración judía a México 1900–1950 has records of almost 18,300 who emigrated to Mexico between 1900 and 1950. Most (7,023) were Ashkenazi Jews whose ancestors had settled in Eastern Europe, mainly Poland. A further 2,640 Jews arrived from either Spain or the Ottoman Empire and 1,619 came from Cuba and the United States.

The 2010 census recorded 67,476 individuals professing Judaism, most of whom live in Mexico City.

The following is a list of notable past and present Mexican Jews (not all with both parents Jewish, nor all practising Judaism), arranged by their main field of activity.

== Academia ==
- Adina Cemet – sociologist, author, essayist.
- Julio Frenk – president of the University of Miami, former Secretary of Health and dean of the Harvard School of Public Health
- Enrique Krauze – public intellectual, historian, essayist, critic, producer, and publisher
- Helen Kleinbort Krauze – historian, mother of Enrique Krauze
- Arturo Warman – anthropologist, cabinet member of Salinas and Zedillo
- Larissa Adler Lomnitz – social anthropologist (French-born)
- Judit Bokser – sociologist
- Flora Botton – sinologist and gender studies scholar
- Daniel Cazés – anthropologist and gender studies scholar
- Enrique Leff – economist, environmental sociologist and environmentalist
- Katya Mandoki – philosophy scholar
- Otto Mayer-Serral – musicologist
- Andrés Roemer – lawyer and economist

== Architecture ==
- Sara Topelson de Grinberg – architect
- Abraham Zabludovsky – architect
- Alejandro Zohn – architect, Holocaust survivor
- Ezequiel Farca – architect

== Arts ==
=== Classical music ===
- Daniel Catán – composer
- Max Lifchitz – composer
- Henryk Szeryng – violinist

=== Photography ===
- Senya Fleshin – photographer and anarchist
- Mariana Yampolsky – photographer

=== Visual arts ===
- Maurice Ascalon – sculptor
- Arnold Belkin – painter, born in Canada
- Olga Costa – painter
- Luis Filcer – Expressionist painter
- Pedro Friedeberg – painter
- Mathias Goeritz – painter, sculptor, born in Germany
- Vlady Kibalchich Russakov – painter
- Tosia Malamud – sculptor
- Leonardo Nierman – painter, sculptor
- Wolfgang Paalen – painter, sculptor and art philosopher
- Fanny Rabel – painter, member of Los Fridos artistic group
- Diego Rivera – painter, muralist
- José Sacal – sculptor
- Jose Luis Seligson – visual artist

== Business ==
- Carlos Alazraki – advertising executive
- Daniel Lubetzky – entrepreneur, author
- Franz Mayer – financier, photographer, collector, and the founder of the Franz Mayer Museum
- Isaac Assa – entrepreneur and philanthropist.
- Moisés Saba – businessman; board member of various companies
- Mauricio Umansky – real estate agent
- Sergio Zyman – marketing executive

== Entertainment ==
=== Film and television ===
- Brigitte Alexander – actress, director, author and translator for UNESCO
- Susana Alexander – actress
- Louis C.K. – actor and comedian
- Erick Elias – actor
- Irán Eory – actress, model
- Amat Escalante – director
- Gabriela Goldsmith – actress
- Israel Jaitovich – host and comedian
- Pati Jinich – TV chef, cookbook author
- Brontis Jodorowsky – actor
- Mauricio Kleiff – screenwriter
- María Eugenia Llamas – actress
- Mariana Levy – actress
- Emmanuel Lubezki – cinematographer, winner of three Ariel Awards for Best Cinematography (1992, 1993, 1994) and three Oscars in the category (2013–2015)
- Luis Mandoki – film director
- Miroslava – actress
- Norma Mora – actress
- David Ostrosky – actor
- Alfredo Ripstein – film producer
- Arturo Ripstein – filmmaker, screenwriter, producer
- Claudia Salinas – model, actress
- Alexander Salkind – producer
- Ilya Salkind – producer
- Diego Schoening – singer, actor, and television host
- Alan Tacher – television host
- Ari Telch – actor
- Gregorio Walerstein – film producer and screenwriter

=== Music ===
- Alix Bauer – singer, founding member of Timbiriche
- Ari Borovoy – songwriter, founding member of the Latin pop group OV7
- Adan Jodorowsky – musician, singer, and actor
- Gilad Kahana – Mexican-born Israeli singer for Girafot, and actor in A Tale of Love and Darkness
- Mark Tacher – musician, vocalist, guitarist, and television host
- Ariel Pink – musician, indie rocker, progenitor of the hypnagogic pop genre

== Journalism ==
- Shanik Berman – journalist
- David Faitelson – sports journalist
- Giselle Fernández – television journalist
- Adela Micha – TV and radio journalist
- Jacobo Zabludovsky Kraveski – TV journalist

== Literature ==
- Chloe Aridjis – novelist
- Sabina Berman – author, playwright, screenwriter
- Anita Brenner – writer, historian
- Mariana Frenk-Westheim – prose writer, Hispanist, translator
- Margo Glantz – writer and critic* a prose writer who was author of the New York Times bestseller The Empress.
- Bárbara Jacobs – author, poet, essayist, translator
- Myriam Moscona – author, journalist, poet and Ladino translator
- Moises Salinas – author and psychologist
- Sara Sefchovich – writer
- Esther Seligson – writer, poet, translator, and historian
- Ilan Stavans – literary critic

== Science ==
=== Biology ===
- Jerzy Rzedowski – botanist, plant geographer, researcher, Holocaust survivor
- Annie Pardo Cemo – cell biologist

=== Engineering ===
- Edward Esseis – nuclear engineer

=== Mathematics ===
- Samuel Gitler Hammer – mathematician

=== Medicine ===
- George Rosenkranz – pioneering scientist in the field of steroid chemistry; contract bridge Grand Life Master
- Pablo Rudomín Zevnovaty – neuroscientist
- Nora Volkow – psychiatrist; current director of the United States' National Institute on Drug Abuse
- David Kershenobich Stalnikowitz – gastroenterologist; former director of the Salvador Zubirán National Institute of Health Sciences and Nutrition
- Samuel Siegfried Karl von Basch – personal physician of emperor Maximilian of Mexico and the inventor of the blood pressure meter (also known as sphygmomanometer)
- Edna Cukierman – biochemist
- René Drucker Colín – neuroscientist
- Enrique Graue Wiechers – ophthalmologist, former rector of UNAM.
- Marcos Rojkind Matlyuk – physiologist
- Arturo Rosenblueth – physiologist, known as one of the pioneers of cybernetics

=== Physics ===
- Jacob Bekenstein – physicist
- Deborah Berebichez – physicist
- Gloria Koenigsberger – physicist
- Marcos Moshinsky – awarded physicist, UNAM cathedratic, Ukrainian-born

== Politics ==
- Andrés Roemer – diplomat, author
- Binyamin Temkin – Israeli politician
- Claudia Sheinbaum – President of Mexico
- David Goldbaum – surveyor and politician of Baja California
- Diego de Montemayor – founder of Monterrey
- Eliezer Ronen – Israeli politician
- Gabriela Brimmer – writer and activist for persons with disabilities
- Jorge Castañeda Gutman – politician and academic who served as Secretary of Foreign Affairs; also known for losing a Supreme Court ruling that would have allowed him to run as an Independent in the 2006 Presidential race
- José Woldenberg – political scientist and sociologist
- Juan de Oñate – Governor of Santa Fe de Nuevo México, descendant of Conversos
- Luis de Carvajal y de la Cueva – adventurer, slave-trader, first Governor of Nuevo León
- Francisca Nuñez de Carabajal – sister of Luis de Carabajal, executed along with family members for practicing Judaism
- Luis de Carabajal the Younger – author, merchant
- Salomón Chertorivski Woldenberg – Senator from Mexico City and former Secretary of Health
- Vicente Lombardo Toledano – labor leader

== Religion ==
- Jacob Avigdor – Chief Rabbi of the Ashkenazi Jewish community, author, Holocaust survivor
- Yosef Dayan – rabbi and the author of several books in Hebrew, Spanish and Italian
- Moisés Kaiman – rabbi from Monterrey

== Sports ==
- Ilana Berger – tennis player
- Wolf Ruvinskis – wrestler

== See also ==
- List of Latin American Jews
- List of Mexicans
- List of Jews
