= Carvajal =

Carvajal (also spelled Carbajal) is a Spanish surname and place name. Notable people with the surname include:

- Ailem Carvajal Gómez (born 1972), Cuban composer and pianist
- Alfonso Carvajal (writer) (born 1958), Colombian writer and editor
- Andarín Carvajal (1875–1949), Cuban athlete
- Antonio Fernandez Carvajal (c.1590–1659), Portuguese Jewish merchant, and the first naturalized English Jew
- Beatriz Carvajal (born 1949), Spanish actress
- Bernardino López de Carvajal (1455–1523), Spanish cardinal
- Dani Carvajal (born 1992), Spanish footballer
- Elímar Carvajal (born 1976), Costa Rican Roman Catholic bishop
- Francisco de Carvajal (1464–1548), Spanish military officer, conquistador, and explorer
- Francisco Fernández Carvajal (1938–2026), Spanish priest in the Opus Dei Prelature and author of several books
- Francisco S. Carvajal (1870–1932), Mexican president in 1914
- Gaspar de Carvajal (c.1500–1584), Spanish Dominican missionary to the New World
- Hilda Pérez Carvajal (1945–2019), Venezuelan biologist
- Iván Carvajal (born 1948), Ecuadorian poet, philosopher and writer
- José de Carvajal y Hué (1835–1899), Spanish lawyer, economist and politician
- José de Carvajal y Lancáster (1698–1754), Spanish statesman
- Juan Carvajal (cardinal) (1400–1469), Spanish cardinal
- Juan de Carvajal, Spanish conquistador, founder of El Tocuyo in 1545
- Luisa Carvajal y Mendoza (1566–1614), Spanish religious poet and writer
- Luis de Carvajal y de la Cueva (c. 1539–1595), Spanish-Portuguese adventurer, slave-trader and governor
  - Luis de Carvajal the Younger (c. 1566–1596), nephew of the above, wrote under the name José Lumbroso and was burned at the stake by the Spanish Inquisition in Mexico City for Judaizing
- Maria Lourdes Jimenez Carvajal (1944–2003), popularly known as Inday Badiday, a Filipino TV host and journalist
- Marcos Carvajal (1984–2018), Venezuelan baseball player
- Máximo Carvajal (1935–2006), Chilean comic book artist
- Melitón Carvajal (1847–1935), Peruvian naval officer
- Natalia Carvajal, Costa Rican communications professional and beauty pageant titleholder
- Patricio Carvajal (1916–1994), Chilean admiral
- Rafael Carvajal (1818–1881), President of Ecuador in 1865
- Tomás José González-Carvajal (1753–1834), Spanish poet and statesman

== See also ==
- BAP Carvajal (FM-51), Peruvian frigate
- Carvajal Ministry, a Spanish government which served between 1746 and 1754 headed by José de Carvajal y Lancáster
- Carvajal syndrome, a type of skin condition
- Edmundo Carvajal Airport in Ecuador
- Carabajal (disambiguation)
