= José Cuevas =

José Cuevas may refer to:

- José Cuevas (boxer) (born 1957), Mexican former world champion boxer
- Jose Cuevas (soccer) (born 1989), American soccer player
- José Luis Cuevas (1934–2017), Mexican modernist painter, printmaker, sculptor, and writer
- José Luis Cuevas (architect) (1881–1952), Mexican architect and urban planner
