= Carabajal =

Carbajal (or Carabajal) was the name of a family of Marranos in Mexico at the end of the sixteenth century and the beginning of the seventeenth, all connected with Don Luis de Carabajal y Cueva, governor of Nuevo León. Several members of the family suffered martyrdom at the stake for Judaizing. Still today the family name Carbajal belongs to families in almost all Hispanic America.

- Francisca Nuñez de Carabajal
- Luis de Carabajal y Cueva, sometimes called Luis de Carabajal the younger
