= Ángel Eduardo Balarezo =

Ecuadorian American criminal defense lawyer

- Born: Guayaquil, Ecuador,
- Education: Georgetown University; Howard University School of Law
- Occupation: Criminal defense lawyer

Ángel Eduardo Balarezo is a criminal defense lawyer based in Washington, D.C. who represents persons charged with serious state and federal offenses.

== A. Eduardo Balarezo ==
A. Eduardo Balarezo (born 1966) is a prominent American criminal defense attorney. He emigrated to the United States in 1972 from Guayaquil, Ecuador.

Balarezo earned a B.A. from Georgetown University in 1989, with a double major in government and history. He received his juris doctor degree, cum laude, from the Howard University School of Law in 1996.

Upon graduating from the Howard University School of Law in 1996, Balarezo practiced in the litigation department of Kaye, Scholer, Fierman, Hays & Handler in New York, NY. In 1998 he began practice in the litigation department of Paul, Hastings, Janofsky & Walker in Washington, DC.

In 2001, he founded his own practice where he continues representing clients charged with serious federal criminal offenses such as racketeering (RICO), federal narcotics conspiracies, international narcotics distribution, sex offenses, homicides, and international extraditions. He is a member of the bars of New York, Washington, DC, Maryland and has been admitted to practice in the United States District Court for the Eastern & Southern Districts of New York, the District of Columbia, the District of Maryland and the Southern, Western and Northern Districts of Texas.

Balarezo's clients have included Antoine Jones in a case in which the U.S. Supreme Court ruled that authorities had to obtain a search warrant to install GPS monitors on suspects vehicles. Balarezo also represented Zhenli Ye Gon, and the drug lords Alfredo Beltrán Leyva and Joaquín "El Chapo" Guzmán.
