= Lomas de Chapultepec =

Neighborhood of Mexico City, Mexico

Coordinates: 19°25′14″N 99°13′08″W

- Neighborhood
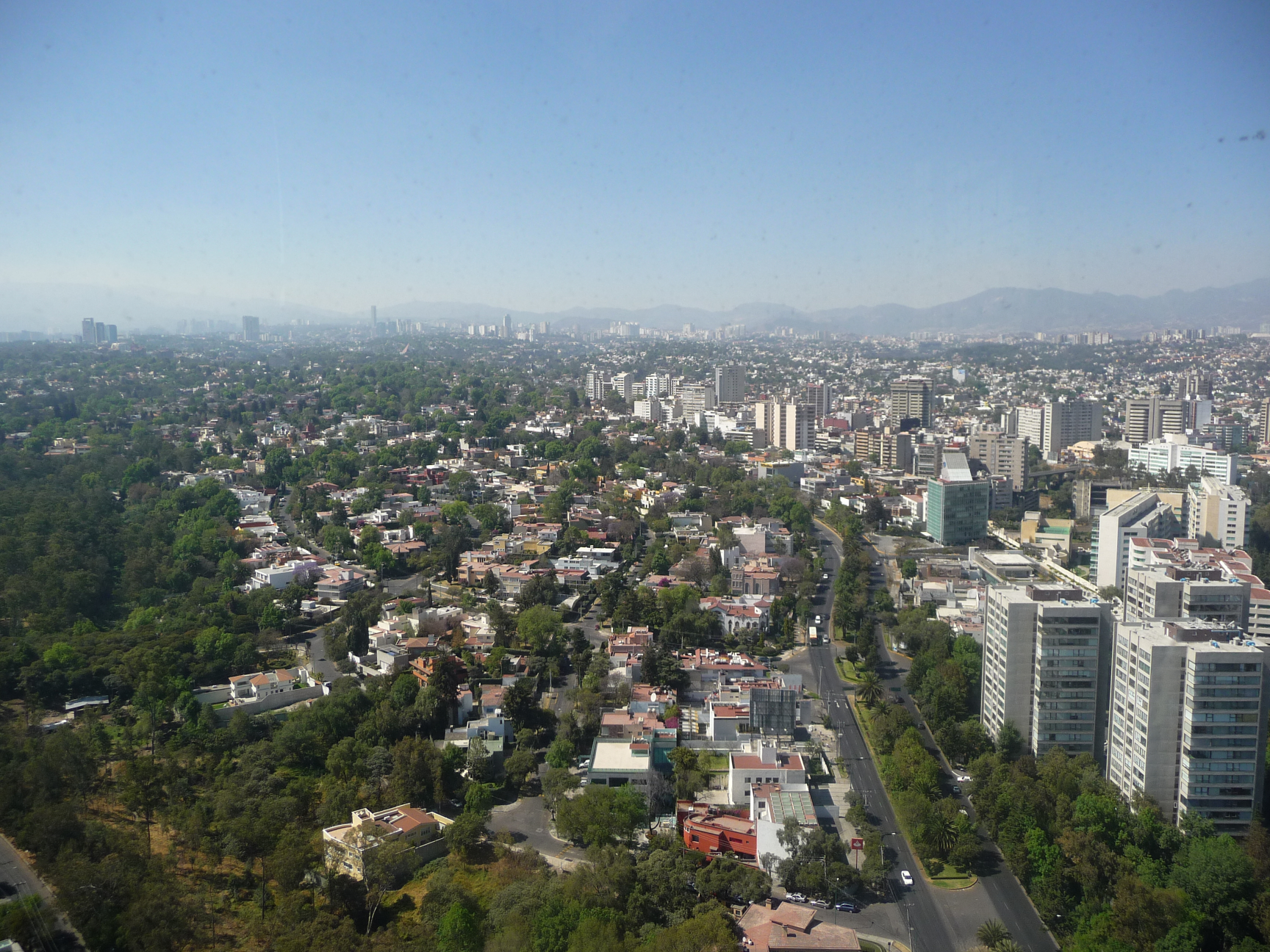
- Lomas de Chapultepec facing from Periférico towards Bosques de las Lomas
- Interactive map of Lomas de Chapultepec
- City: Mexico City
- Borough: Miguel Hidalgo

Population (2005)
  - Total: 20,440

Lomas de Chapultepec (English: "Chapultepec Hills") is a colonia, or officially recognized neighborhood, located in the Miguel Hidalgo borough of Mexico City. It dates back to the 1920s, when it was founded with the name Chapultepec Heights. Its main entrance is through Paseo de la Reforma.

Lomas de Chapultepec continues to be a predominantly residential zone characterized by single-family homes, however there are commercial properties and high-rise developments at the neighborhood periphery. Home to some of the biggest mansions in the city and many high-net-worth individuals, the colonia has gained a reputation of affluence.

== History ==
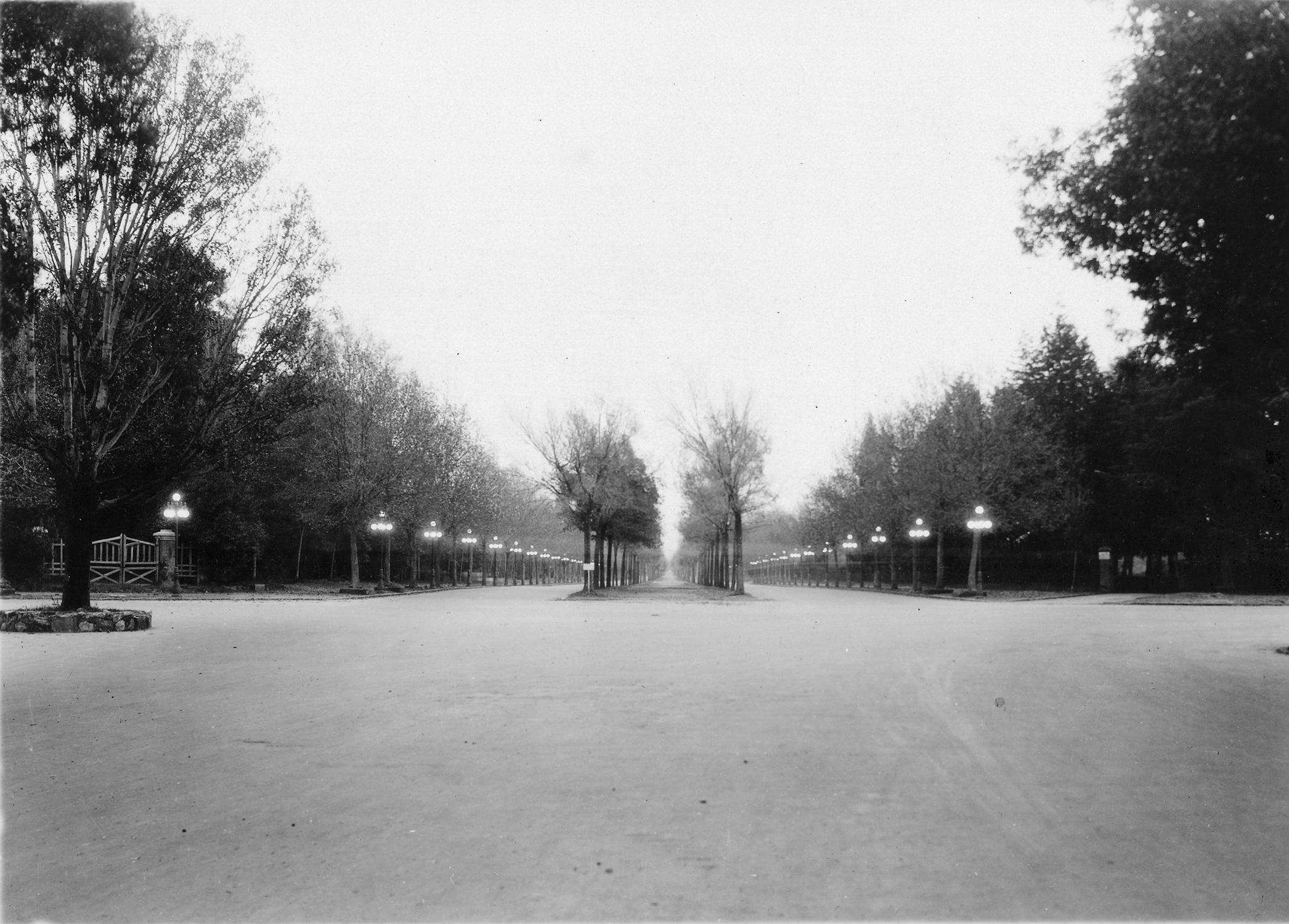
Paseo de la Reforma in Lomas de Chapultepec, 24 June 1929.

In the early 1920s, Mexico City suffered a housing shortage as a result of internal migrants fleeing from uncertainty in the provinces caused by the Mexican Revolution. To meet demand, the Ayuntamientos of the Distrito Federal passed various city ordinances in order to make it easier for private investors to develop urban subdivisions. Also beneficial was Article 27 of the 1917 Constitution, which was used to promote agrarian land reform and indirectly encouraged the construction and emergence of new urban developments when it prompted the change of land-use of the properties surrounding the capital. A total of 26 to 32 colonias were built as a direct result, one of which was Lomas de Chapultepec.

On September 28, 1921, the corporation, Chapultepec Heights Company, was formed with the objective of developing the land acquired from the Cuevas Lascuráin, Echeveste, Lascano, and Romay families — old families of viceregal Spanish lineage whose descendants participated in the initial sale of plots or kept portions as patrimony. These families, heirs to the hacienda model, found in urban development a way to transform land into urban capital. The company was founded by five investors (two Americans, two Mexicans and one Briton) who were able to buy the 687 hectares for about one cent per square meter.

In 1922, Chapultepec Heights was planned by José Luis Cuevas Pietrasanta in the "Garden City" fashion. With large lots, large gardened yards, wide winding streets, gardened boulevards and scattered small shopping areas within walking distances from homes. The early settlers attracted to the area were young professionals and some of the nouveau riche revolutionaries, bureaucrats and the new business class of Mexico City. Smaller homes were built on the side streets while mostly large houses were built on Paseo de la Reforma and Paseo de Las Palmas, the two main avenues.

The name was changed to Lomas de Chapultepec from Chapultepec Heights in 1924 since foreign words were not allowed in the rótulos used to advertise the new development.

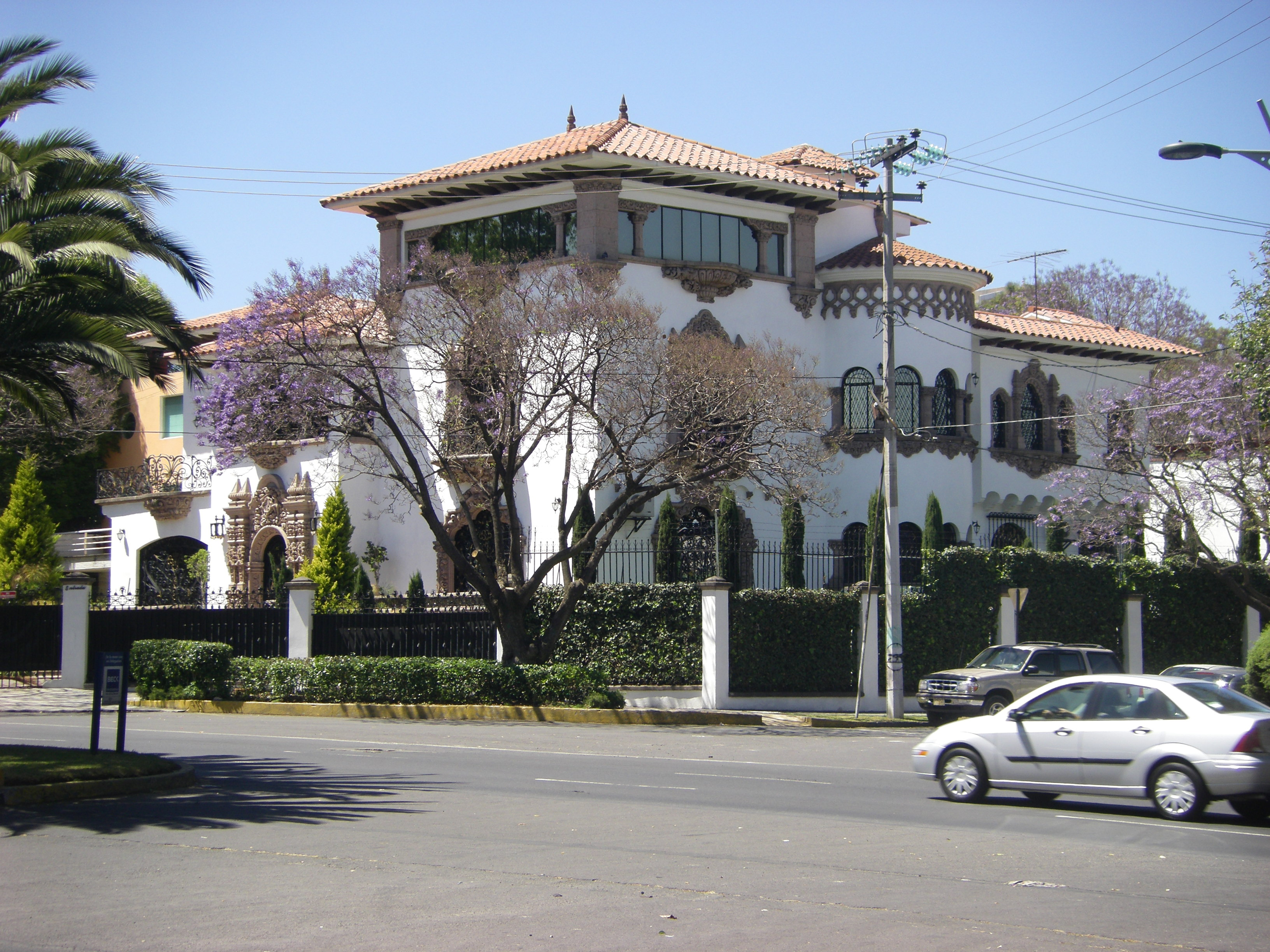
INBA-catalogued property built in the Colonial Californiano style. This mansion was on the market for an asking price of 75.88 million Mexican pesos, or about US$6 million.

Most of the early houses were built in the "Colonial Californiano" style, with stone carvings around windows and doors and pitched roofs. Many of these early homes are catalogued and protected by the Instituto Nacional de Bellas Artes as they have been deemed a cultural patrimony. Later on, Modern houses designed by notable architects such as Luis Barragán, Juan Sordo, Ricardo Legorreta and Enrique Norten were built. Many of the houses built during the era known as the Mexican Miracle are still standing, and constitute the largest mansions in the western area of the city.

The colonia grew in size, being mostly inhabited by the upper class and by wealthy immigrants that arrived in Mexico in the early 20th century.

Today, Lomas de Chapultepec is inhabited by Mexican and foreign business professionals, celebrities, politicians and other wealthy individuals. In recent years commercial and business areas have developed on the edges of the neighborhood and there are also various embassies located in the area. Sales in the northwestern part of Mexico City, which includes luxury areas like Lomas de Chapultepec, generally average US$1 million per house.

=== Use of "Lomas" in subsequent developments ===
Starting in the early 1950s, capitalizing on Lomas de Chapultepec's success and the glamour of its name, other developers opened subdivisions further out into adjacent Estado de Mexico with names including the branding word "Lomas" (Spanish for hills). Some of the neighborhoods that stemmed from these expansions are Lomas de Tecamachalco, Lomas de la Herradura, Lomas de las Palmas, Lomas Anahuac, Lomas Altas, Lomas de Bezares, Lomas de Santa Fe, Lomas de Vistahermosa and Interlomas.

Today, the area encompassing Lomas de Chapultepec and neighboring developments is sometimes incorrectly referred to as simply Las Lomas, though locals specify which neighborhood they live in, be it Tecamachalco, Herradura, etc.

== Geography ==
Lomas de Chapultepec is located in the northwestern hills of the Anahuac Valley, which is mostly contiguous with Mexico City, and was mostly created following the contour of the terrain, leaving the natural drainage as open space. The developed area was planted with a large number and variety of trees, and is now one of the most wooded areas in the city.

The colonia's borders are:

- On the northwest and north, the Tecamachalco area of Cuajimalpa borough (colonias Lomas de Tecamachalco, San Miguel Tecamachalco, etc.) and colonia Reforma Social
- On the northeast, the Anillo Periférico ring road and Polanco district
- On the east, colonia Molino del Rey and the Bosque de Chapultepec
- On the south, the 2nd and 3rd sections of the Bosque de Chapultepec; colonias Lomas Altas and Lomas de Reforma
- On the west, colonia Bosques de las Lomas

== Demographics ==
Lomas de Chapultepec is divided into eight sections, in 2005 their population was as follows: Section I had 1,855 individuals, Section II had 1,528, Section III had 3,302, Section IV had 3,161, Section V had 2,379, Section VI had 2,069, Section VII had 707, and Section VIII had 5,439. Combining for a population of 20,440 inhabitants in the colonia.

=== Jewish community ===
The initial Jewish community centered around Condesa, Roma and the historic center. In the 1950s-1970s, Mexico City's Jews tended to move the hills of Mexico City's leafy, affluent northwest: Polanco, Lomas de Chapultepec, Interlomas, Bosques de las Lomas, and Tecamachalco.

== Economy ==
Interjet had its headquarters in Lomas de Chapultepec, as does Google Mexico.

== Notable residents ==
- Cantinflas, comedic actor of the Golden Age of Mexican cinema.
- José Luis Cuevas, architect and planner of Lomas de Chapultepec.
- Xóchitl Gálvez, tech entrepreneur and politician.
- Martín Luis Guzmán, novelist and owner of El Mundo newspaper.
- Antonio Rivas Mercado, architect best known for the Monumento a la Independencia.
- Angélica Rivera, actress and former first lady of Mexico.
- Carlos Slim, telecommunications mogul and former world's richest person.
- Ernesto P. Uruchurtu, politician, head of the Federal District Department from 1952 to 1966.
- Zhenli Ye Gon, pharmaceuticals CEO accused of drug trafficking.
