= Julio Carrasco Bretón =

Mexican artist (born 1950)

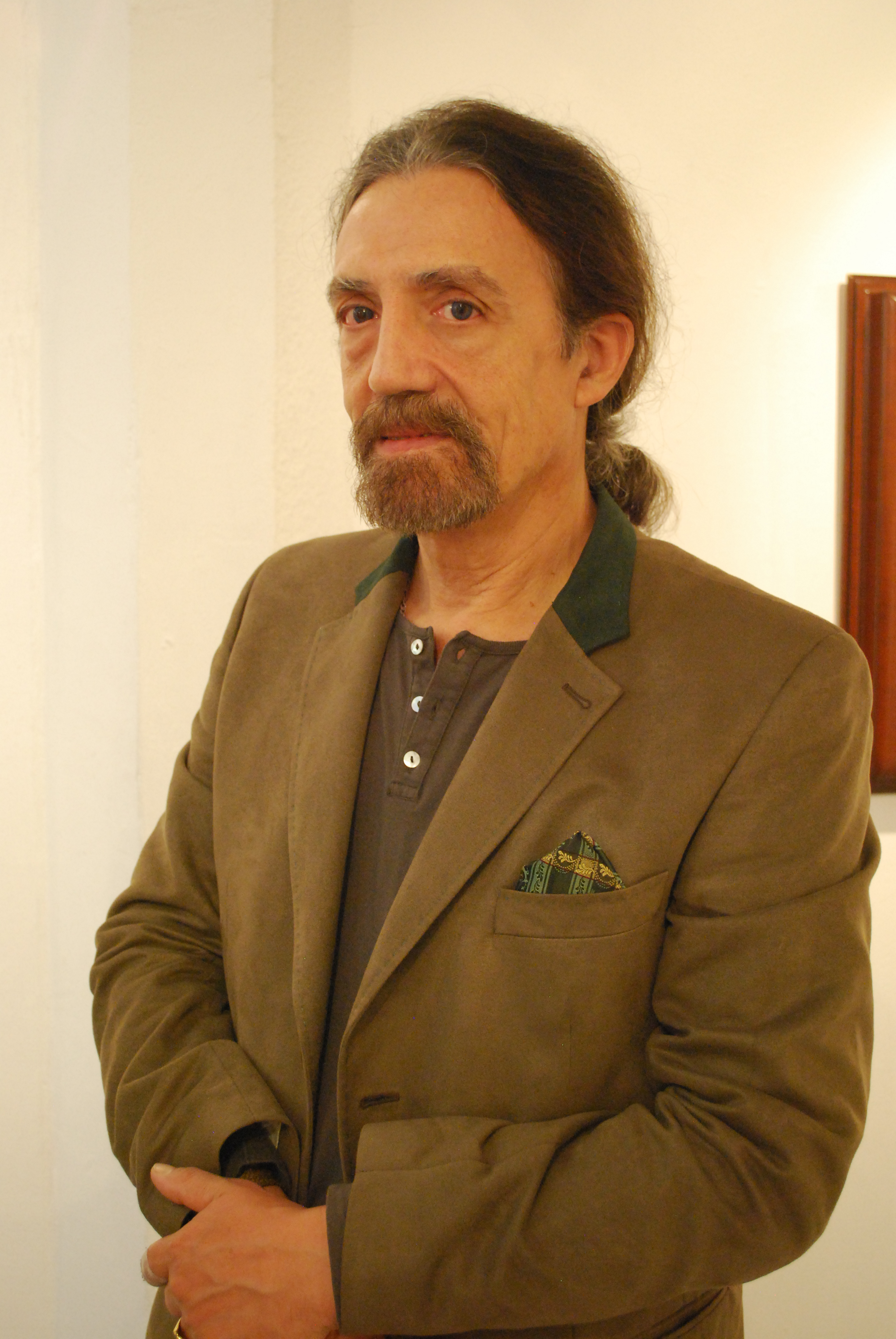
Julio Carrasco Bretón in 2012

Julio Carrasco Bretón (born 1950) is a Mexican artist mostly dedicated to murals and canvas work. He invented a technique for creating murals which allows him to create panels in his workshop, and then stack them for transport to the assembly site. His educational background is in science and philosophy as well as art and the themes in his work, especially murals often reflect these themes. In addition to creating art, he has been active in cultural, artistic and copyright issues, involved in the founding of a number of organizations and involved in others additionally.

== Life ==
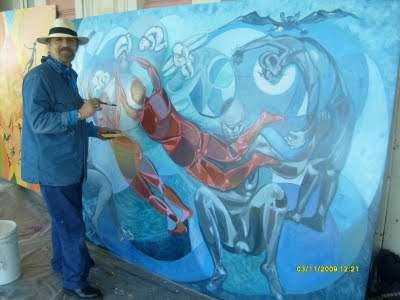
Artist working on canvas piece

Julio Carrasco Bretón was born in 1950 in México. He studied chemical engineering at Universidad Nacional Autónoma de México, graduating with honors in 1975. He studied painting with Lino Picaseno at the Escuela Nacional de Artes Plásticas . In 1977, he began studying for a master's degree in the philosophy of science. With this mixed background, he has since given classes in art, philosophy and chemistry at UNAM.

His career has been dedicated to art but he has been active in issues related to art, culture and copyright. He collaborates with a number of newspaper and cultural magazines such as Archipiélago, Excélsior, México Hoy and Quehacer politico as well as two radio programs on Radio Fórmula and Radio 620. He has given over seventy talks about culture and copyright in Latin America, the United States, Spain, France, Canada, the U.K. and Italy.

He has participated in the founding of a number of organizations including the Sociedad de Artistas Ludicos, Sociedad Mexicana de Derechos de Author para los Artistas Plásticos (Somaap) (president from 2001 to 2006), the Sociedad Mexicana de Artistas Plásticos “SOMART” in 1980, the Consejo Mundial de Artistas Visuales in 1989 and Academia de Ciencias Naturales in 1993.

He is a member of the Salón de la Plástica Mexicana. From 1996 to 2002, he was an advisor to the Fundación Roberto Medellín at UNAM. In 2000, he became a member of the Consejo Directivo Nacional of the Sociedad Mexicana de Autores de Arte Plásticas. He was president of the Consejo Internacional de los Autores Gráficos y Plásticos y Fotógrafos of the Confederación Internacional de las Sociedades de Autores y Compositores from 2005 to 2009.

He currently lives and works in Paris, France.

== Art career ==
Most of Carrasco's artistic work has involved the creation of murals and canvas works. However, he did one major state scene in 1976 at the Teatro El Granero for a performance of a work by Fernando Arrabal. Since the 2000s he has created lithographs with Atelier Bramsen in Paris and engravings with the Mario Reyes workshop in Mexico City.

Carrasco created his first mural in 1973 and since then has painted over fifty, at universities, government buildings, cultural institutions and private companies in Mexico, France, Spain, Costa Rica, Canada and the United States. His best known murals in Mexico are those at the Camara de Diputados in Mexico City and a mural related to Mexican president Adolfo López Mateos at the Plaza Legislativa. Other important murals are found at the city government building in Monterrey, the national Academy of Art in Sofia, Bulgaria and the World Intellectual Property Organization in Geneva.

He has created and patented his own method of creating a kind of portable mural, which he called “isoplastica.” The technique involves the creation of panels with a compound of silicone and pulverized marble. (inbarcarta) These panels can be created in his workshop, then rolled and stacked for shipping. Because of this stacking ability he called these works, “murals in taco.” When the mural is delivered, it can be assembled in about eight hours.

Over his career, he has created over 900 canvas works. The first time his works were shown to the public officially was at a collective exhibition at Galería Yoca in 1973, with his first individual exhibition in 1977. Since then, he has had over sixty individual exhibitions and participated in over 150 collective exhibitions in nineteen countries. His works can be found in institutions and collections in most of the countries of the Americas and in Europe.

In August 2023, Carrasco unveiled a large mural located in the immigration area of Ben Gurion Airport, an initiative by Mexican-Israeli philanthropist Isaac Assa.

== Artistry ==
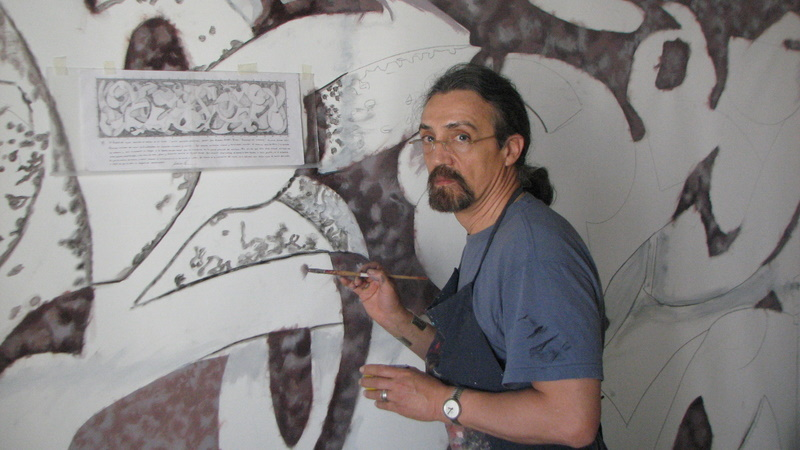
Working on Epopeya del Intelecto

In general, his paintings have a surrealistic influence can be seen in his use of figurative, geometric and abstract elements in his works. They often have an element of playfulness in the compositions, lines and the use of color. Since 2000, his works have become more abstract and geometric with strong colors. The themes of his murals mostly relate to science, philosophy and art, such as ecological problems, mythology, social movements, history and the effects of technology on society. A mural in the Plaza Legislativo is called Sintonía Ecotrópico which deals with the effects science and technology has on nature. The mural called “La epopeya del intelecto” deals with the ability to create and invent. The mural “Perfume” relates to the history and the process of making perfume, installed at the Plaza Lancaster Hotel in Toluca . His canvas work is usually of medium size. Themes in his canvas works usually relate to the erotic and literary along with moods, human relationships, politics, dance, cinema, the theater and poetry. The feminine figure appears frequently in this work.

Carrasco is one of the few Mexican artists who still promotes muralism, with innovations, although there is little government support for such projects. Most of these are of the “isoplastica” type, created in panels in his workshop and then transported to the place where they are assembled. He considers himself a fan of the techniques of Siqueiros, especially the use of multiple angles or “poliangulariad.” One of these portable mural commemorates the Battle of Puebla in 1985, which traveled around the state of Puebla .

He believes that he work should be completely independent and for this reason, he has never been an artist-in-residence at any public or private institution.
