= El Neguev Synagogue =

Jewish congregation and synagogue in Hidalgo, Mexico

El Neguev Synagogue (Jewish Community of Venta Prieta)
- Spanish: Sinagoga El Neguev en Pachuca (Comunidad Mexicana Israelita El Neguev «Venta Prieta»)
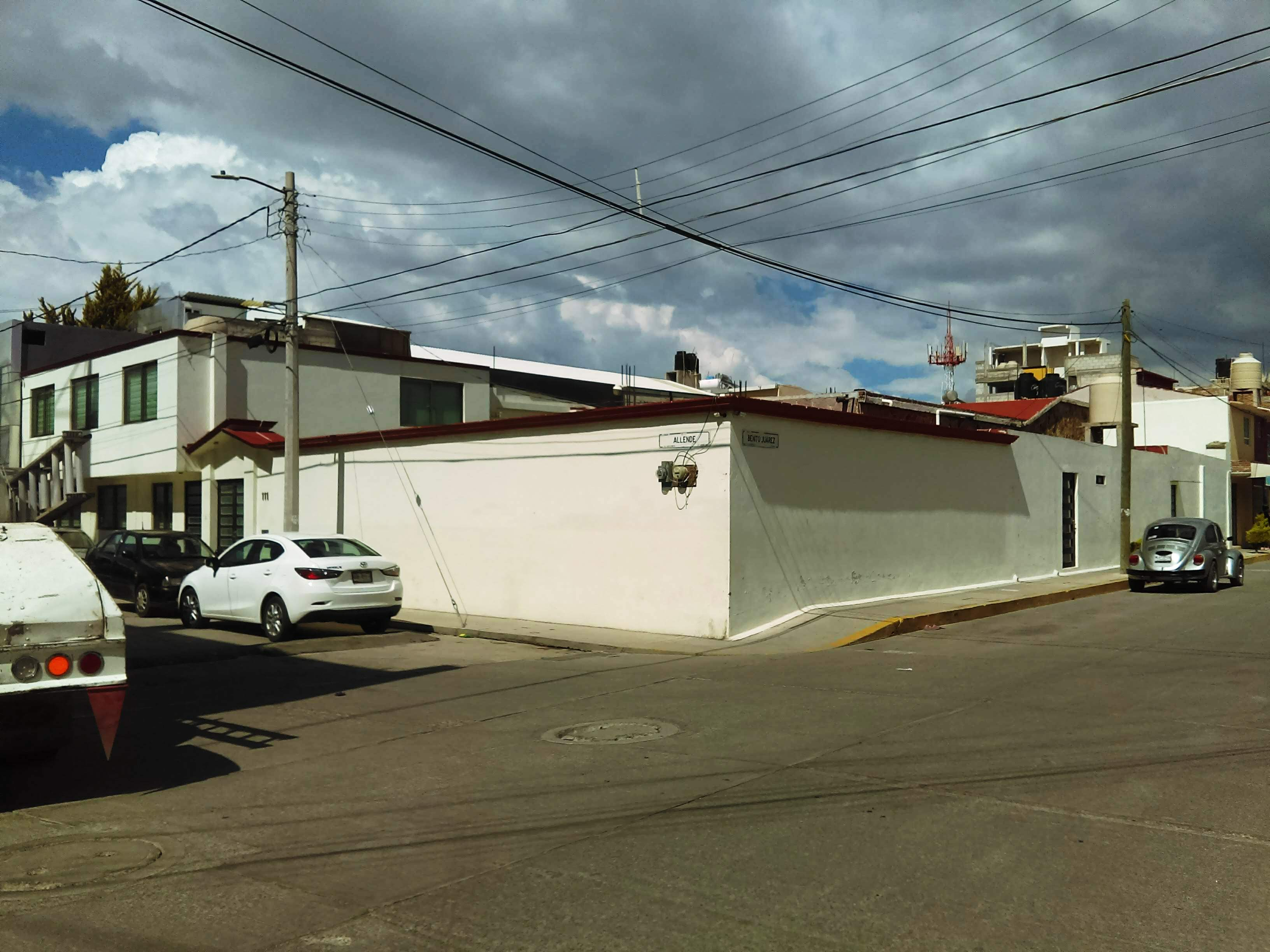
- The synagogue, in 2021

- Location of the synagogue in Hidalgo

Religion
- Affiliation: Judaism
- Rite: Nusach Sefard
- Ecclesiastical or organizational status: Synagogue
- Year consecrated: 1930
- Status: Active

Location
- Location: Venta Prieta, Pachuca de Soto, Hidalgo 42083
- Country: Mexico
- Interactive map of El Neguev Synagogue (Jewish Community of Venta Prieta)
- Coordinates: 20°05′15″N 98°46′13″W

Architecture
- Founder: María Trinidad
- Funded by: Téllez brothers
- Established: c. late 19th century
- Completed: 1930

The El Neguev Synagogue (Spanish: Sinagoga El Neguev en Pachuca), also known as the Jewish Community of Venta Prieta (Spanish: Comunidad Mexicana Israelita El Neguev «Venta Prieta») or the El Neguev Mexican Israelite Community of Venta Prieta, is a Jewish congregation and synagogue, located on Venta Prieta, in the city of Pachuca de Soto, Hidalgo, Mexico.

The congregation comprises people who are descended from B'nei Anusim, also known as Conversos, Jews who were either forcibly converted to Christianity during the Spanish Inquisition and later returned to Judaism. The congregation was established in the latter part of the 19th century or the early 20th century, and the synagogue was completed in 1930.

== History ==
It is a small congregation, of which many view themselves as either Sephardic Jews (due to a family history coming from Spain to Mexico) or as descendants of one of the lost tribes of Israel. The synagogue was founded in 1930 by the Téllez brothers and today run by the Téllez family. For many years, Rabbi Samuel S. Lerer was the educational and organizational leader of the community until his retirement in 1999.

It is said that the community was founded between the end of the 19th century and 1920, by María Trinidad, a widow of one of the Téllez brothers. Maria viewed herself as a descendant of the Anusim, and (according to tradition) arrived in Michoacán with her mother and twelve children escaping a religious revolt (possibly the Cristero War), that was occurring during that period. Maria reportedly kept the customs of her ancestors, including refraining from eating pork, ceasing work on Friday and praying only to HaShem.

== Nomenclature ==
The name Venta Prieta, originated in the 1920s as the name of the neighborhood. The word Venta comes from the vendor stalls along the side of the road, as the area lies on the road from Pachuca to Mexico City and Actopan. Prieta described the soot from charcoal used in cooking as well as the black soil of the area.

== See also ==
- History of the Jews in Mexico
- List of synagogues in Mexico

== Bibliography ==
- Azen Krause, Corinne; Katz de Gugenheim, Ariela (January 1, 1987). Los judíos en México: una historia con énfasis especial en el período de 1857 a 1930 (in Spanish). Universidad Iberoamericana.
- Frank, Ben G. A Travel Guide to the Jewish Caribbean and Latin America. Pelican Publishing.
- Stavans, Ilan (December 30, 2011). Return to Centro Histórico: A Mexican Jew Looks for His Roots. Rutgers University Press.
