= Zhenli Ye Gon =

Chinese-Mexican businessman (born 1963)

- Born: Ye Zhenli; January 31, 1963 (age 63); Shanghai, China
- Citizenship: Mexico
- Occupation: Businessman
- Known for: Alleged drug trafficking

Chinese name
- Simplified Chinese: 叶真理
- Traditional Chinese: 葉真理
Transcriptions
Standard Mandarin
- Hanyu Pinyin: Yè Zhēnlǐ

Zhenli Ye Gon (born January 31, 1963, in Shanghai) is a Chinese-Mexican businessman currently under suspicion of trafficking pseudoephedrine or ephedrine precursor chemicals into Mexico from Asia. He is the owner and legal representative of Unimed Pharm Chem México, as well as various other Mexican corporations. From 2002 to 2004, Unimed had been legally authorized by the Mexican government to import thousands of metric tons of pseudoephedrine and ephedrine products into Mexico, as a part of its vast importation business. Pseudoephedrine and ephedrine products at the time were widely used in over-the-counter cold medications such as Sudafed, but could also be used by manufacturers of methamphetamine.

Audits conducted by Mexican officials between 2002 and 2006 at Unimed showed no improprieties such as improper diversion of any such chemicals. Nevertheless, after Unimed's license to import pseudoephedrine and ephedrine products ended on July 1, 2005, it was alleged that Ye Gon and certain employees of his violated the law by continuing to import four unauthorized containers of pseudoephedrine or ephedrine precursor chemicals into Mexico in late 2005 and 2006. Only 4 of Unimed's 291 imported shipments (from Canada, China, England, Germany, Israel, Hong Kong and the United States) into Mexico have ever been questioned. In July 2007, the U.S. government filed an indictment charging that the importation of these four shipments into Mexico was part of a conspiracy to aid and abet the importation of methamphetamine into the United States. Two years later, the U.S. case was dismissed with prejudice by The United States District Court for the District of Columbia, in August 2009.

He is claimed to be a member of the Sinaloa Cartel, a charge that Ye Gon, who has no previous criminal record, has denied. He became a citizen of Mexico in 2002 and was recognized as a wealthy business owner in Mexico before these allegations of wrongdoing arose.

In 2007 Zhenli Ye Gon fled to the US and was arrested after Mexican police seized over $200m in cash from his home. Ye Gon fought extradition for nine years while incarcerated in the US, but was extradited to Mexico in October 2016.

== U.S. case against Ye Gon ==
In 2007, Zhenli Ye Gon was indicted in the United States District Court for the District of Columbia with a single count of conspiracy to aid and abet the manufacture of 500 grams or more of methamphetamine, knowing or intending that it would be imported into the United States. Federal agents arrested him in a Wheaton, Maryland restaurant on July 23, 2007. From the date of his arrest, Ye Gon has always maintained that he is not guilty. Prior to the Mexican government's enforcement actions, Ye Gon was openly building a state-of-the-art pharmaceutical plant in Toluca, Mexico, and in his federal court proceedings, the U.S. prosecutor referred to Ye Gon as "a very sophisticated businessman."

Although the criminal allegations arose from Unimed's importation of four shipments of alleged precursors of pseudoephedrine and ephedrine during 2005–06, Unimed still had on-hand, in March 2006, an unsold balance of 9.806 metric tons of finished pseudoephedrine products, which had been legally imported in 2004, but which were still sitting in its warehouse. With the consent of Mexican officials, this large quantity of pseudoephedrine products was sold in compliance with the Mexican government's directions. During his U.S. proceedings, Ye Gon's lawyers pointed out the incongruity of Unimed allegedly importing unfinished pseudoephedrine products while it still had on hand almost 10 metric tons of finished pseudoephedrine products, which had been sitting idly for years, and could have been diverted if criminal activity had been contemplated. They also noted how none of the four challenged shipments were listed as containing pseudoephedrine or ephedrine precursors, and that Mexico's government-approved chemist assigned to Unimed, Bernardo Mercado Jiminez, stated under oath that he did not know that the imported substances were prohibited under Mexican law, and that he advised Ye Gon, who is not a chemist, that the imported substances were legal chemicals not controlled or restricted under Mexican law.

Samples taken from the four challenged shipments by Mexican officials were never turned over to U.S. authorities for independent testing, as Ye Gon's U.S. defense counsel had requested. The U.S. prosecutor reported that "the [U.S.] government was told that the samples from the first two intermediate shipments sampled had been used up in the laboratory analysis." The fourth shipment had been seized by Mexican officials in its entirety, but its contents too apparently have now been destroyed. Questions have also been raised by Ye Gon's defense experts about the methodology of the earlier testing of these samples conducted in Mexico's laboratories. During Ye Gon's U.S. prosecution, the lead U.S. prosecutor also openly admitted that "I am not proffering that I have interviewed a witness, you know, who is a drug trafficker who said I got ephedrine or pseudoephedrine from him, so that to me would be a smoking gun kind of witness.... I don't want the Court to think that's what I'm saying because I'm not saying that. What I'm saying is that there's other kinds of testimony."

Ye Gon was scheduled to go to trial on his U.S. charge in September 2009. On June 22, 2009, the U.S. Department of Justice filed a motion to dismiss its case against Ye Gon, citing Mexico's interests as well as evidential concerns. At a hearing on the same day, prosecutors admitted that one of their key witnesses had recanted. His criminal defense attorneys, Manuel J. Retureta, of Retureta & Wassem, PLLC, and A. Eduardo Balarezo vigorously litigated this Brady issue before the Honorable Emmet G. Sullivan. As a result of the efforts of Messrs. Retureta and Balarezo, all charges brought against Ye Gon by the government of the United States were dismissed with prejudice on August 28, 2009. Judge Sullivan also noted how "this court made numerous inquiries of government counsel as to just what the status of the requests were to get drug samples for testing purposes, to provide evidence for the prosecution, and basically ... Mexico just snubbed the United States."

Mexico's separate pending criminal charges against Ye Gon were not dismissed, however, and the U.S. Department of Justice continued its efforts to extradite Ye Gon to Mexico to face criminal charges there. Renewed efforts by Ye Gon's lawyers to have him released on bail following the dismissal of his U.S. criminal case proved unsuccessful, and a U.S. magistrate judge ordered that Ye Gon must remain in custody pending a decision on whether the U.S. can extradite him to Mexico to face charges there.

In March 2010, Ye Gon retained the services of lawyer Gregory S. Smith to represent him in his extradition case before the United States District Court for the District of Columbia. On February 9, 2011, Magistrate Judge John M. Facciola certified Ye Gon's extraditability to Mexico to face charges there.

In his habeas petition, Ye Gon has argued that in light of the U.S. case's dismissal, his extradition is barred by principles of international double jeopardy (non bis in idem). In light of Government admissions that "Mexico has not set out to prove ... That Ye Gon mass produced methamphetamine itself," Ye Gon has also claimed that extradition is improper under the legal requirement of dual criminality (since the alleged precursor chemicals imported into Mexico are not controlled substances in the U.S.), and other barriers. The petition also notes how many of Mexico's allegations of wrongdoing underlying the extradition request come from statements made by disgruntled and/or fired former employees of Unimed, and that the Mexican arrest warrant's listed "main accomplice" of Ye Gon has since recanted. In addition, the key Mexican prosecutors responsible for Mexico's charges against Ye Gon have themselves since left office. Jorge Joaqin Diaz Lopez, the lead prosecutor who swore out and presented Ye Gon's Mexican arrest warrant, submitted a "voluntary irrevocable resignation" in January 2009, following a Mexican anti-corruption initiative known as Operacion Limpieza ("Operation Clean-Up), although Mexico continues to claim that Diaz resigned for personal reasons. Diaz's boss at the time, Noe Ramirez Mandujano - who served as the head of Mexico's national organized crime unit - was himself later criminally charged and jailed in November 2008, after allegedly receiving $500,000 in exchange for providing sensitive information to drug cartels in Mexico. Zhenli Ye Gon was extradited to Mexico in October 2016.

== Mexican case ==
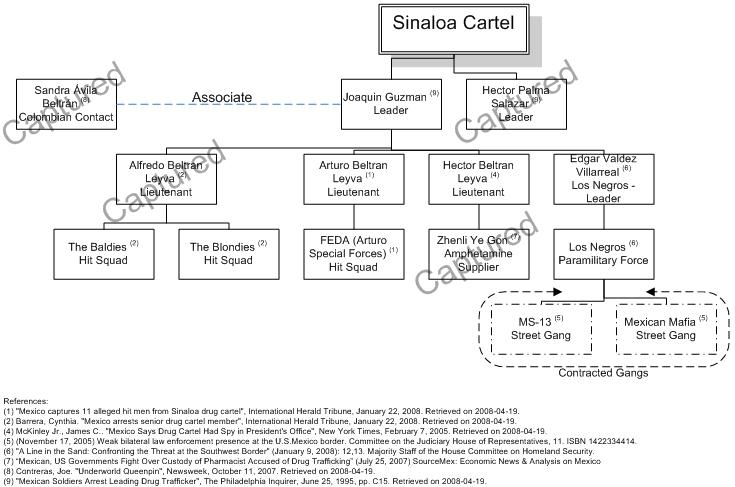
Ye Gon on the Sinaloa Cartel hierarchy in early 2008

In March 2007, the Mexican government entered Ye Gon's home and seized hundreds of millions of dollars in cash. In an interview with the news agency AP, Ye Gon explained he agreed to keep the money in his home after his life, as well as those of his family, were threatened by members of Mexico's PAN party.

Two Chinese citizens (Yen Yongging and Fu Huaxin) were apprehended along with others on July 23, 2007. On December 5 United Pharm Chem had seen 19,497 kilos of a product that Mexican authorities claimed contained a controlled precursor chemical seized. Other individuals affiliated with his companies and the challenged importations were also arrested. On July 9, 2010, however, defendant Juan Llaca Diaz was declared innocent in a Mexican court, and acquitted of organized crime and drug charges. Mexico's Judiciary Council issued a statement noting that prosecutors had failed to prove key parts of their case, including that the substance seized was a psychotropic or narcotic drug. In 2012, two brothers of Ye Gon, who had been arrested shortly after the initial seizures in 2007, were also ordered released from custody by the Mexican courts. In more than six years since the original seizures and arrests, no person affiliated with any of these events has yet been convicted of any crime, either in the U.S. or in Mexico.

At the time of his arrest, it was reported that Ye Gon was listed as wanted by a number of countries by Interpol, although no country other than the U.S. and Mexico ever filed any criminal charges. Ye Gon was said to be in the U.S. as he was supposedly spotted in Las Vegas at the moment of the seizure of the cash and in New York City afterwards. He was arrested without incident at a restaurant in Wheaton, Maryland on July 24, 2007.

== Assets seized ==
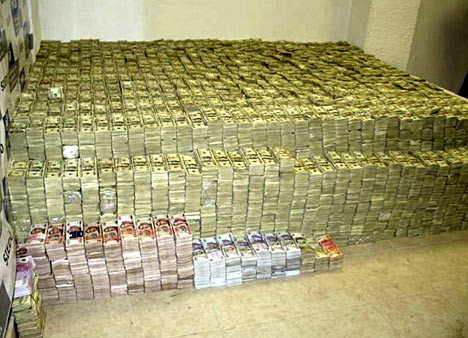
Part of the currency seized during the raid

The fortune, reportedly found by the police on March 15, 2007, at his residence at Lomas de Chapultepec in Mexico City included the following:

- 207 million U.S. dollars
- 18 million Mexican pesos
- 200,000 euros
- 113,000 Hong Kong dollars
- 11 centenarios (Mexican gold bullion coins made of 1.20565 troy ounces (37.500 g) of pure gold)
- A great amount of jewels, of unknown value

Confiscated along with the money were also:

- Two Mexican-style dwellings of approximately 20 million pesos
- A war chest of automatic guns
- 1 lab in construction of unknown value
- 7 vehicles

Nine persons were arrested, four of them of Asian origin.

Defense lawyers in Ye Gon's U.S. criminal case asked to view all of these seized materials, but they were never produced in the U.S. by Mexican officials. U.S. prosecutors reported that the seized cash had not been retained by Mexican officials as evidence, but instead had been counted and deposited into bank accounts. Many seized contents of Ye Gon's home, located in Mexico City's suburb of Lomas de Chapultepec, were subsequently auctioned off by Mexican officials.

The police raid of Ye Gon's home and businesses in Mexico, on March 15, 2007, took place one day after a high-level meeting occurred between U.S. President George W. Bush and Mexican President Felipe Calderon in the Mexican city of Mérida on March 14, 2007, at which both Presidents announced plans to expand bilateral and regional counter-narcotics and security cooperation. Later, on October 22, 2007, the U.S. and Mexico jointly announced their "Merida Initiative," named after this city where both Presidents had met. The Mérida Initiative involved a multi-year plan in which the U.S. would provide significant financial assistance to the Mexican government, plus smaller amounts to other Latin American countries, to help them combat drug trafficking and other organizations. Pursuant to this $1.1 billion announced Mérida Initiative, the Bush Administration eventually requested $500 million for Mexico in supplemental FY2008 appropriations, plus another $450 million for Mexico in its FY2009 budget request.

Two Mexican federal agents who were involved in the arrests at the Ye Gon mansion were found dead in the southern Mexican state of Guerrero, as reported on August 2, 2007. Ye Gon was not among the persons who had been arrested by these agents several months before, however, and no charges have ever been filed suggesting any link whatsoever between their deaths and Ye Gon.

Ye Gon's name has also been referenced in connection with subsequent money laundering investigations, including one involving Las Vegas Sands. Sands attorneys have reportedly defended against these allegations by noting how Sands had conducted due diligence on Ye Gon, and concluded that his funds sent to the casino were not laundered, after sending a private investigator and company employee down to Mexico to confirm that Ye Gon was a legitimate businessman.

=== Origins of the money ===
According to the Mexican authorities, Ye Gon's money is the product of drug-trafficking activities. However, Ye Gon asserts that he was forced by Javier Lozano Alarcón, Secretariat of Labor and Social Welfare, to keep it at his home, and that this money would be used during Felipe Calderón's presidential campaign in 2006. Felipe Calderon denied connection with the money and said it was invention by Ye Gon to avoid prosecution. An expert report filed in Ye Gon's habeas corpus case, authored by Georgetown University Professor of Latin American Studies Mark Chernick, has deemed this explanation plausible, given Latin America's electoral history of "clientelism" run by party bosses, and the unusually close nature of Mexico's 2006 presidential elections.

== Extradition to Mexico ==
After his initial examination in Mexican custody, Ye Gon's lawyer Rogelio de la Garza stated on October 21, 2016, that his client was calm and looking forward to demonstrating that there was nothing illegal about the money found at his home.

== In pop culture ==
A poll by the daily newspaper Diario Reforma found that most Mexicans either believe Ye Gon's story that he was framed by government officials or believe neither side. Bumper stickers reading "I believe the Chinaman" have been sold.

== See also ==
- Mexican drug war
- Sinaloa Cartel
- Joaquín "El Chapo" Guzmán
