= Hernando Alonso =

Spanish conquistador

Hernando Alonso (c. 1460 – 17 October 1528) was a Spanish conquistador. He is believed to be the first Jewish person to come to the New World, and was the first person in the New World to be burned at the stake.

== Biography ==
He was possibly from Moguer, in Andalusia.

Originally, he was a blacksmith. He married Beatriz, sister of Diego de Ordaz.

He arrived in Mexico along with Pánfilo de Narváez around 1520 or 1521. At this time, he was over 60 years old. He was involved in the Fall of Tenochtitlan, having been one of the shipbuilders who built the brigs, and was also likely present at La Noche Triste.

He left the army, and was involved in the meat trade between 1524 and 1528.

His wife Beatriz had died sometime before the siege of Mexico. According to remembrances of him, he remarried, first to a woman named Ana; after Ana's death, he married Isabel de Aguilar. After his death, Isabel de Aguilar married a conquistador, Juan Perez de Gama, and moved to Seville. His daughter with Beatriz, also named Beatriz, married Alonso de Nuñez in Seville.

In 1528, he was arrested on charges of Judaizing. Three charges were brought against him. One charge was of pouring wine on his 2-year-old son's body, letting the wine drip off his son, and drinking the wine, in mockery of baptism. Another accused him of forbidding his wife to attend Mass so that she would not violate the law of Niddah. The third one was having baptized his son according to Jewish law. According to historian Boleslao Lewin, the charges were likely based on at least partially fabricated evidence; nevertheless, Alonso was tortured until he confessed, and was subsequently burnt at the stake. His brother, Gonzalo de Morales, was also burnt at the stake on the same day.

Reportedly, two or three of his children were living in Mexico City in 1574.

=== Legacy ===
American writer Alan Cheuse wrote the story Hernando Alonso based on the life of Alonso. It was published in 1998 as part of his anthology Lost and Old Rivers.
