= Gloria Suzanne Koenigsberger Horowitz =

Mexican astronomer and researcher

Gloria Koenigsberger
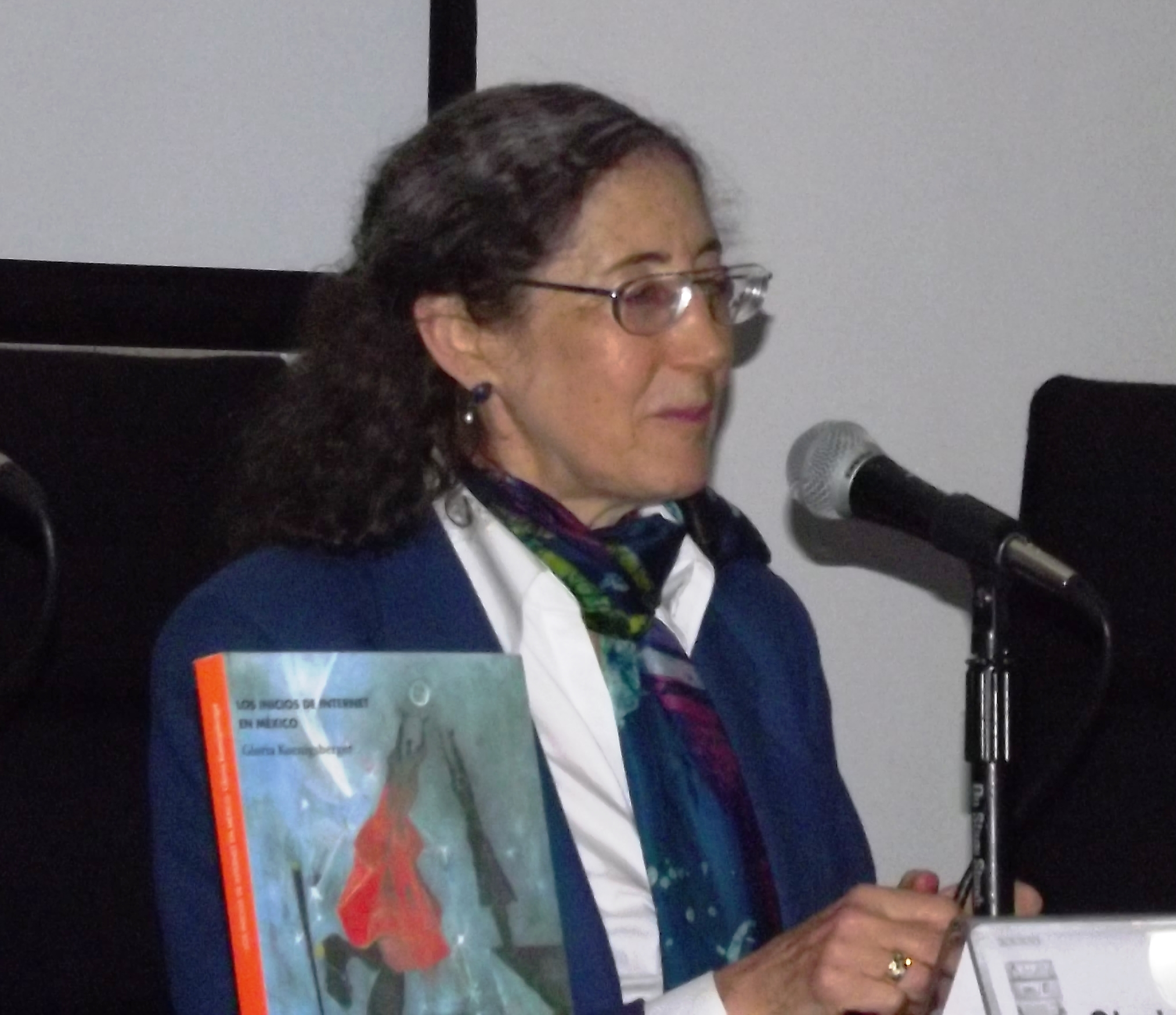
- Born: Gloria Suzanne Koenigsberger Horowitz; Mexico City, Mexico
- Education: Universidad Nacional Autónoma de México
- Occupations: Scientist, teacher, researcher
- Years active: 1982–present
- Employer: National Autonomous University of Mexico
- Known for: Research on massive stars and pioneering Internet in Mexico
- Notable work: Los inicios de Internet en México

Gloria Suzanne Koenigsberger Horowitz is a Mexican astrophysicist and professor working at the National Autonomous University of Mexico (UNAM). Her areas of expertise are in stellar spectroscopy, massive stars and binary interaction effects. She was director of UNAM's Instituto de Astronomía (1990-1998) and a leading member of the team that succeeded in establishing the first connection to the Internet in Mexico in 1989.

== Academic career ==
Gloria Koenigsberger was born in Mexico City. She obtained a licentiate in Physics at the UNAM School of Sciences, graduating in 1978, and a doctorate in Astronomy at Pennsylvania State University in 1983, under the direction of Lawrence H. Auer. She served as Director of the Instituto de Astronomía of UNAM from December 4, 1990, until early December 1998, during which time the Institute initiated collaborative programs with several US observatories aimed at improving the San Pedro Mártir (SPM) National Observatory infrastructure and promoting the construction of a large new technology infrared-optimized telescope on that site. As part of these initiatives, UNAM became the second international member of the Association of Universities for Research in Astronomy (AURA), collaborated with the University of Texas in the construction of optical components for the Hobby-Eberly Telescope, and promoted studies for the construction of a Magellan-telescope clone at the SPM observatory. She also promoted the growth of the Institute's research branch located in Ensenada, Baja California, and the creation of a new branch located in the city of Morelia, Michoacán, which later evolved into UNAM's Instituto de Radioastronomía y Astrofísica.

Koenigsberger holds a permanent position as professor and research scientist at UNAM's Instituto de Ciencias Físicas based in Cuernavaca, Morelos, is a member of the Sistema Nacional de Investigadores (SNI) at Level III. and a member of the International Astronomical Union (IAU). She served on the board of directors of the Association of Universities for Research in Astronomy (AURA) (1997-1999 and 2001-2007) and was a member of its Audit Committee from 2007 to 2016.

Her research is devoted to the study of the structure and evolutionary processes in massive stars, particularly the effects caused by interactions in binary systems.

== Recognition ==
Koenigsberger is a member of the Mexican Academy of Sciences.

== Selected publications ==
Koenigsberger has published more than 120 research articles including:

- Benítez-Llambay, Pablo; Masset, Frédéric; Koenigsberger, Gloria; Szulágyi, Judit (2015). "Planet heating prevents inward migration of planetary cores". Nature. 520 (7545): 63–65. arXiv:1510.01778. Bibcode:2015Natur.520...63B. doi:10.1038/nature14277. PMID 25832403. S2CID 4466971.
- Koenigsberger, Gloria; Morrell, Nidia; Hillier, D. John; Gamen, Roberto; Schneider, Fabian R. N.; González-Jiménez, Nicolás; Langer, Norbert; Barbá, Rodolfo (2014). "The Hd 5980 Multiple System: Masses and Evolutionary Status". The Astronomical Journal. 148 (4): 62. arXiv:1408.0556. Bibcode:2014AJ....148...62K. doi:10.1088/0004-6256/148/4/62. S2CID 118348677.
- Palate, M.; Koenigsberger, G.; Rauw, G.; Harrington, D.; Moreno, E. (2013). "Spectral modelling of theαVirginis (Spica) binary system". Astronomy & Astrophysics. 556: A49. arXiv:1307.1970. Bibcode:2013A&A...556A..49P. doi:10.1051/0004-6361/201321909. S2CID 53519054.
- Koenigsberger, G.; Moreno, E.; Koenigsberger, Gloria; Szulágyi, Judit (2013). "Tidal Flows in asynchronous binaries: The β-factor". EAS Publications Series. 64: 339–342. arXiv:1312.1372. Bibcode:2013EAS....64..339K. doi:10.1051/eas/1364047. S2CID 118387538.
- Flores, A.; Koenigsberger, G.; Cardona, O.; de la Cruz, L. (October 2011). "Wind Structure of the Wolf-Rayet Star EZ CMa = HD 50896". Revista Mexicana de Astronomía y Astrofísica. 47 (2): 261. Bibcode:2011RMxAA..47..261F. ISSN 0185-1101.
- Moreno, E.; Koenigsberger, G.; Harrington, D. M.; Szulágyi, Judit (2011). "Eccentric binaries". Astronomy & Astrophysics. 528: A48. arXiv:1102.4301. doi:10.1051/0004-6361/201015874. S2CID 59045830.
- Van Der Hucht, Karel A.; Koenigsberger, Gloria; Eenens, Philippe R. J. (1999). "Wolf-Rayet Phenomena in Massive Stars and Starburst Galaxies". Proceedings of the 193rd Symposium of the International Astronomical Union. San Francisco: Astronomical Society of the Pacific. ISBN 9781583810040.
