= Hilda Pérez Carvajal =

Venezuelan biologist

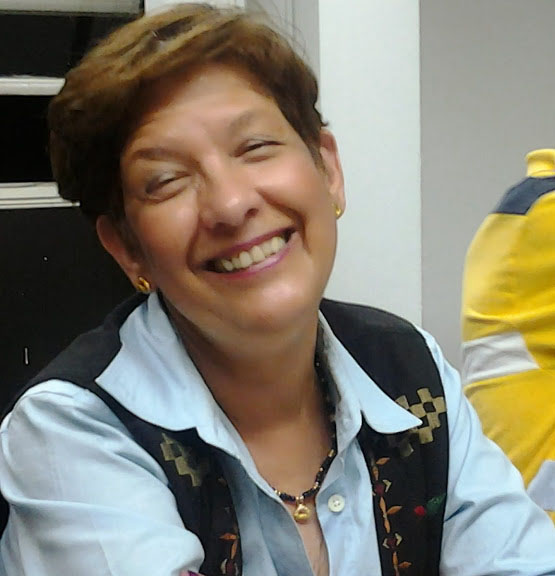
- Born: Jordán Hilda Antonieta Pérez Carvajal; 11 May 1945 (age 81); Cumaná, Venezuela
- Education: Central University of Venezuela
- Awards: 2013 Women in Science Award
- Scientific career
- Fields: Biology

Hilda Pérez Carvajal (born 11 May 1945) is a Venezuelan biologist from the Central University of Venezuela. She was president of the Venezuelan Society of Parasitology at the end of the 1980s. Perez studied at the Central University of Venezuela and graduated with a biology degree in the year 1967. Her undergraduate thesis was on E. Coli bacteriophages. Pérez is most known for the research she did on Malaria and Leishmania's in Venezuela.

Throughout Pérez's career she has won some recognitions, including; The Microbiology Award for Students, the Award for Scientific Merit, and the Prize of the Pro-Health Fund of the Venezuelan Beer Industry of 1998.
