= Helen Kleinbort Krauze =

Polish-born Mexican Jewish journalist (1925–2024)

- Born: Heleny Kleinborta; August 1, 1925; Białystok, Poland
- Died: November 12, 2024 (aged 99); Mexico City, Mexico
- Education: University of Cambridge
- Occupations: Journalist and columnist
- Years active: 1959–2024
- Employer(s): Novedades; El Heraldo de México; El Sol de México
- Children: 1
- Awards: Premio de los Voceadores de México (1967); Medalla Magdalena Mondragón (1989); Premio Club Primera Plana (ca 2009); Ampretur premier award for excellence in 2009; 2012 AMPG award

Helen Kleinbort Krauze (August 1, 1925 – November 12, 2024) was a Polish-born Mexican Jewish journalist who worked for over five decades as an interviewer, features and travel writer and columnist. She was first with Novedades, later with El Heraldo de México and more recently with Sol de Mexico and Protocolo magazine.

== Background ==
Helen Krauze arrived in Veracruz, Veracruz, Mexico, when she was a small child with her Jewish-immigrant parents, José Kleinbort and Eugenia Firman, via Santander, Spain to seek refuge from the German invasion of Poland, the Holocaust, and the war persecution of Jews elsewhere. She attended Maddox Academy, a bilingual Spanish-English school, and later earned a degree in English literature from the University of Cambridge.

Krauze lived in Mexico City, and was the mother of one daughter and two sons, including Enrique Krauze, a Mexican historian and writer. She died in Mexico City on November 12, 2024, at the age of 99.

== Career ==
Before she was a journalist, Krauze wrote newsletters during the 1950s.

Krauze began her journalism career in 1959 when she was hired by Daniel Dueñas at the Novedades newspaper to conduct interviews. She became known for her interviews first at Novedades and then later at El Heraldo de México and El Sol de México. She published around 900 interviews during her career, including interviews with Carlos Monsivais, Sarita Montiel, Josephine Baker, Spanish actor Manolo Fabregas, Mexican author Hugo Argüelles (Los Cuervos están de luto), Elena Poniatowska, Emilio Portes Gil, Teddy Stauffer, and Pedro Friedeberg. She was a journalist for Novedades until 1989 when she was hired by El Heraldo de México (known later as the Diario Monitor), and she became known later for her column La Semana con Helen Krauze. She also contributed to Protocolo, Kena, Actual, Claudia and Siempre.

In order to support her family she supplemented her income by doing costume work for a few of Tulio Demicheli's films, such as Novia, esposa y amante (1981), and TV host for La hora de los locutores.

== Affiliations ==
On 4 October 1967, Krauze became part of the group of journalists Veinte Mujeres y un Hombre ("Twenty Women and a Man"). This group, founded by Hylda Pino de Sandoval, encouraged women to be educated and work in the journalism profession. She was also a member and vice president of Asociación Mundial de Mujeres Periodistas y Escritoras ("World Association of Women Journalists and Writers"). She was also member of the Asociación Mexicana de Prensa Turística (Ampretur) ("Mexican Association of Tourism Press"), founded in 1975 by Agustín Salmón Esparza.

== Awards ==
Over a career that spanned fifty years, Krauze was presented with several prestigious awards for her contributions to Mexican journalism:

- 1967, Premio de los Voceadores de México
- 1989, Medalla Magdalena Mondragón (25th year of journalism)
- 2009, Premio Club Primera Plana (50th year of journalism)
- 2009 Award for excellence in tourism journalism at the award's premiere presented by Ampretur, the Mexican Association of Tourist Press
- 2012 Doña Cuca Massieu Medal presented by the Asociación de Mujeres de Prensa in Guerrero (AMPG)

== Books ==
- Viajera que Vas (1998).
- Pláticas en el tiempo (2011).
