= Isaac Assa =

Mexican-Israeli businessman

- יצחק אסא
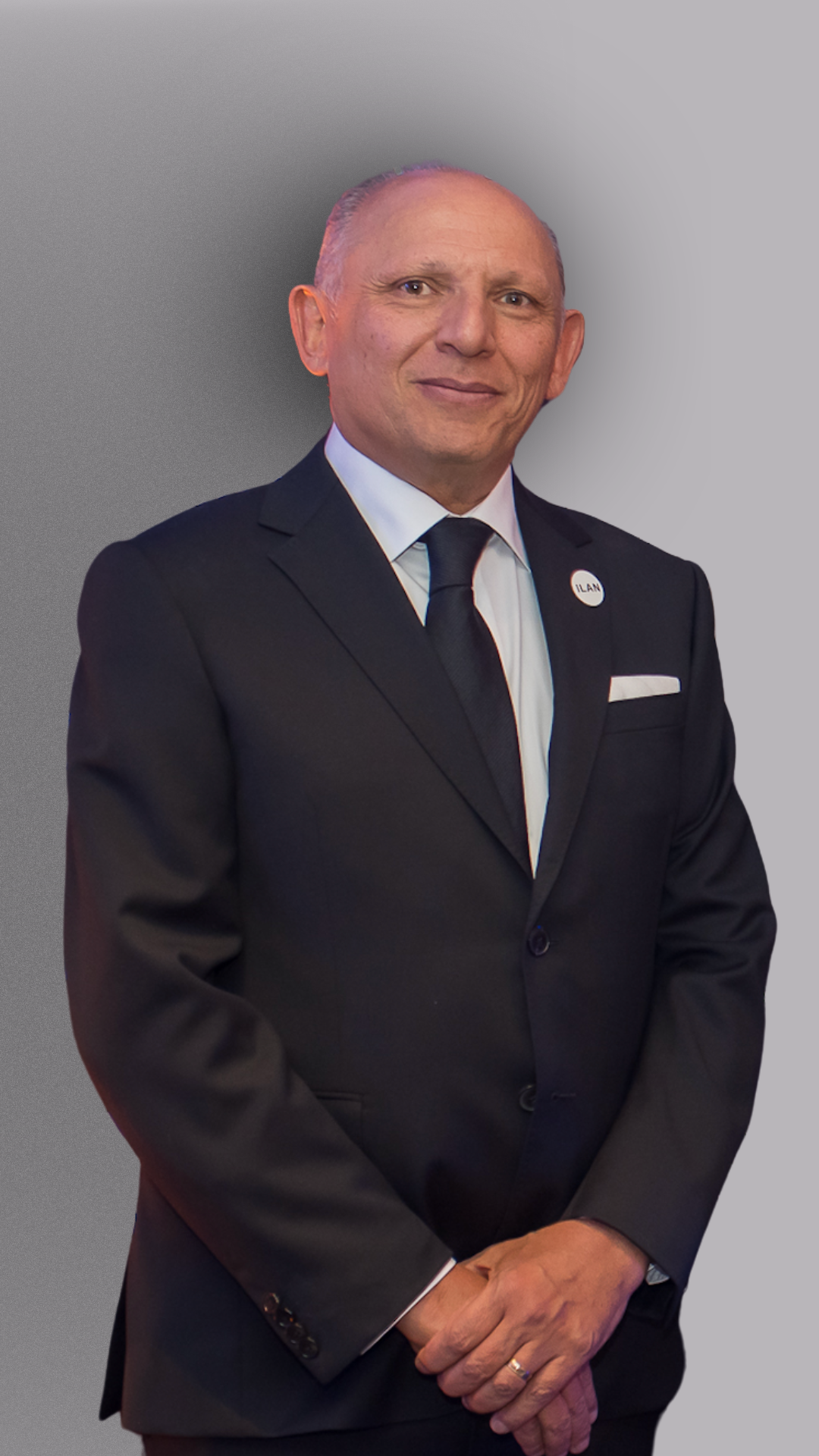
- Isaac Assa in 2025
- Born: 12 March 1964 (age 62); Tel Aviv, Israel
- Occupations: Entrepreneur, consultant, philanthropist
- Known for: CEO of Grupo Assa; Founder and President en ILAN
- Spouse: Alicia Cojab (m. 1986)
- Children: 5
- Relatives: Benjamin Assa Duek (father)

Isaac Assa Farca (Tel Aviv, Hebrew: יצחק אסא; March 12, 1964) is a Mexican-Israeli entrepreneur who has worked in the textile, real estate, and cybersecurity sectors, as well as a consultant for companies and governments.

He is the founder and president of ILAN Israel Innovation Network, an NGO that promotes innovation linked to Israel.

== Biography ==
Assa was born in Tel Aviv, Israel, but his family moved to Mexico before he turned one year old. His father was Benjamín Assa Duek, originally from Damascus, Syria, a tailor by trade and a soldier during the 1948 Palestine war.

Benjamín settled in Mexico in 1957. He later married Rebeca Farca Romano, Isaac's mother. Isaac grew up in Tecamachalco, State of Mexico. Isaac completed his primary and secondary education at the Colegio Hebreo Monte Sinaí.

Grupo Assa originated in 1963 when Benjamín Assa partnered with the Kalach and Warshow families to create Zentrix, the first textile company to introduce spandex in Mexico. In 1978, they acquired facilities in Atizapán de Zaragoza, incorporating warping, dyeing, and finishing processes into production. At the age of 15, in 1979, Isaac began working at the group's new plant in Atizapán de Zaragoza, where he learned the company's operations from production to management. He was appointed plant director in 1984. He complemented his experience with studies at the Instituto Panamericano de Alta Dirección de Empresa.

In 1984, the Group acquired the company Lartel, integrating the processes of manufacturing and exporting intimate apparel for brands such as Berlei, Playtex, Piorette, Olga, and Bally, among others.

In 1995, Assa moved to New York to establish the group's offices in the United States, which represents 90% of Zentrix's market, as a supplier to sportswear brands like Nike, Under Armour, and Lululemon.

Since 2010, he has been a member of the Peres Center for Peace and Innovation, serving as Mexico's representative on the international board.

Assa diversified his activities by founding several companies. In 2014, he established Akza, a business intelligence consultancy; in 2019, Axterra, focused on real estate and in 2020, ICE, dedicated to cybersecurity.

In 2018, he stepped down from executive positions in his companies to focus entirely on philanthropy, serving as the founder and president of ILAN.

Assa was one of the driving forces behind "Sowing Life", a flagship program of the Mexican government during the presidency of Andrés Manuel López Obrador. This program involved the planting of timber and fruit trees on more than one million hectares of national territory, with the participation of over 630,000 farmers. The president-elect, Claudia Sheinbaum, declared her intention to continue the program during her administration.

In 2023, Isaac Assa donated an extensive mural, created by visual artist Julio Carrasco Bretón, which is located in the migration area of Ben Gurion Airport.

On July 20, 2024, Assa presented an ILAN award for political innovation to Argentine President Javier Milei.
