= Luis Filcer =

Mexican Expressionist painter

Luis Filcer (December 4, 1927 – July 19, 2018 in San Miguel de Allende) was a Mexican Expressionist painter, whose works generally deal with themes of injustice and struggle. His family fled Ukraine for Mexico after the Russian Revolution to escape Jewish persecution and Filcer grew up in Mexico City. Although his interest in painting came early, he had to sell a painting before his family would accept his vocation. Strongly influenced by Van Gogh's life, he began to draw and paint the struggles of everyday people, something he continued since. His work has been exhibited in various countries of the world and has been recognized with several medals and membership in the Salón de la Plástica Mexicana.

== Life ==
Filcer was born in Zhytomyr, Ukraine in 1927 to a Jewish family. When he was only six months old, the family fled the country because of Jewish persecution after the Russian Revolution. No one in his family would talk about horrors they experienced in Ukraine. After arriving to Mexico City, the family settled in the La Lagunilla neighborhood. His father was able to speak only a few words in Spanish and sold clothing in the streets. He later formed a partnership with other immigrants to open a sweater factory. Since childhood, Filcer disliked school but learned to draw. He also studied accounting in order to help his father. He stated that although working at the family business was hard, he was able to meet many people in this way, for whom he often drew pictures for fun.

When he was sixteen he entered the Academy of San Carlos to study painting, attending class in the morning and working in the afternoon. Each evening after the close of business, he painted. He later studied at the workshop of Spanish painter José Bardasano for three years, focusing on drawing and painting.

At age seventeen, Filcer read the biography of Van Gogh, and after observing the poverty of the market workers began to draw them. He then decided to travel to Guanajuato to learn and draw miners and the difficult conditions under which they worked.

Although his art instructors encouraged him, his father saw painting as nothing more than a hobby. Filcer had decided to make painting a career but could not convince his father to approve until he had sold his first painting at the Galería Romano.

An award at the Círculo de Bellas Artes allowed Filcer to obtain a scholarship to live and study for two and a half years in Paris and Rome, beginning at the École nationale supérieure des Beaux-Arts in Paris. However, in addition to spending hours of his own time drawing models at the academy, he also drew and painted common people such as fishermen, peasants, stevedores, factory workers and beggars. He did this activity with a friend named Juvenal Sansó, which whom he went to Rome to continue his studies. However, a teacher there asked him why he did not paint more bohemian people, which angered him. He left the Italian school after only a month. While in Europe, Filcer spent time traveling and visiting museums in London, Madrid, Amsterdam, Rome and Florence, studying the paintings there. He stated that he learned more in this way, with his first views of works by Francisco de Goya changing his life. Van Gogh's work also strongly affected him.

== Career ==
Over his career, Filcer has had over 300 exhibition around the world, especially Mexico, the Netherlands, the United States, Belgium, Japan, France, Israel, Italy and Germany.

He began his career in Mexico, where he sold his first painting and in 1949 worked at the Taller de Gráfica Popular. He represented Mexico in biennales in Chile, Japan and England, which led to a scholarship to study in Paris and Rome. His work was also part of an exhibition organized by the Palacio de Bellas Artes called Jewels of Mexican Art which traveled the world for fifteen years.

In 1957, Filcer returned to Mexico and at first worked on paintings for the Galería Havre. Success at this showing allowed the artist to return to Europe and visit Jerusalem. He also traveled to various cities in the United States. Filcer married a Dutch woman and stayed in the Netherlands for twenty years, with many individual exhibitions in the country including the Heart Ripper, De Beyerd, Van Bommel-van Dam and Frans Hals museums, as well as the Grand Palais in Paris in 1988.

He then returned to Mexico where he had exhibitions in 1990 and 1991 at the Museo de Arte Moderno, the Museo Contemporáneo de Arte at UNAM in 1994, the Museo de la Estampa in Mexico City in 1998, in 2000 he had exhibitions at the Centro Cultural Mexiquense and the Museo Casa del Risco. In 2001, he had exhibitions at the Museo Francisco Goitia in Zacatecas and the Jaski Gallery in Amsterdam.

Recognitions for Filcer's work include gold and silver medals from the Círculo de Bellas Artes in 1949 and 1950 and the José Clemente Orozco gold medal in 1953. In 1998, he was named a Knight of the City of Maastricht. He is also a member of the Salón de la Plástica Mexicana.

== Artistry ==
Filcer settled on an aesthetic early, primarily in the use of chiaroscuro to express drama and strong Expressionism. He is inclined towards thick brushstrokes for strong, sudden effect. He declares himself a "fervent admirer of Van Gogh, Goya and José Clemente Orozco." He was influenced by the works of Van Gogh which depicted the hard life of miners as well as Goya's depictions of war. Influence from José Clemente Orozco is evident in some of his works, especially in sarcasm. He stated "I paint all that I experience including my fantasies and demons; I am an Expressionist and I paint what stirs my emotions.

His work does not depict idealism, but rather explores themes of justice and injustice to provoke change. He is concerned with the "decadent communication" that dominates among people and he mocks indifference, intolerance and misunderstanding. His figures show experience, faces and emaciated bodies struggling to survive. His topics are frank and defined. He has done works related to the Tlatelolco massacre, casinos in Las Vegas, the Mexican Revolution and the Mexico City Metro.
