= José Luis Cuevas (architect) =

Mexican architect (1881–1952)

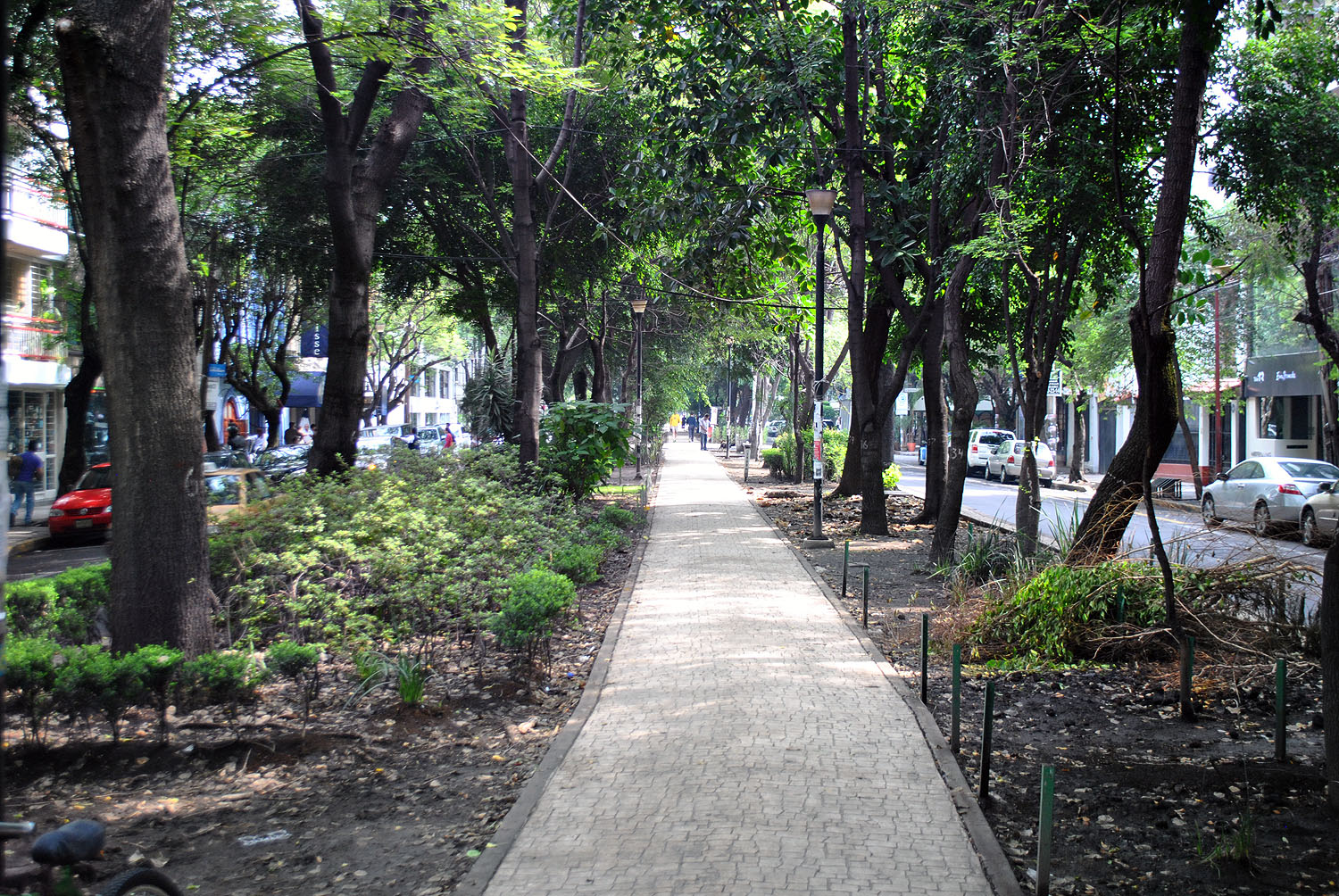
Park median in Avenida Ámsterdam, the "grand avenue" of the Mexico City subdivision Colonia Hipódromo de la Condesa, designed in 1926 and inspired in part by Ebenzer's Garden City

José Luis Cuevas Pietrasanta (1881–1952) was a Mexican architect and urban planner.

He designed the Mexico City subdivisions, including the Lomas de Chapultepec (1922), and Colonia Hipódromo (1926, a.k.a. Hipódromo de la Condesa) in what is now known as the Condesa area, including its iconic parks Parque México and Parque España. The subdivisions were based on the principles of the Garden City as promoted by Ebenezer Howard, including ample parks and other open spaces, park islands in the middle of "grand avenues" such as Avenida Amsterdam in colonia Hipódromo.

Cuevas was also responsible for the design of La Escuela de las Artes del Libro (The School of Book Arts) in Mexico City, from 1944 to 1946.
