= Ciudad de la Torá =

Planned community in Mexico

Ciudad de la Torá in Ixtapan de la Sal, State of Mexico, is a planned community aimed at attracting Haredi Jews from within Mexico as well as observant Jewish immigrants from Latin America. Construction began in 2021 with funding primarily from businessman Abraham Mizrahi.

Mexican Rabbi Yosef Tawil is chief of the town's rabbinical council.

== See also ==
- Shtetl
