= Colegio Hebreo Monte Sinaí =

Jewish private school in Cuajimalpa, Mexico City

Coordinates: 19.3837°N 99.2746°W

Colegio Hebreo Monte Sinaí A.C. (CHMS; Hebrew: בית הספר העברי הר סיני) is a Jewish private school in Colonia Vista Hermosa, Cuajimalpa, Mexico City. It serves preschool through senior high school.

== History ==
It was established in 1943. It was originally located in Colonia Roma, in Cuauhtémoc, in a building acquired by three people in 1942. In 1966 a new campus opened in Naucalpan, State of Mexico; its headstone was laid in 1965.

In 1991, the first stone of a third campus was laid in the Bosques de las Lomas neighborhood, designed by renowned architect Abraham Zabludovsky. It was inaugurated on May 8, 1994, in a grand community celebration.

It began the International Baccalaureate in 2010.

Among its alumni is the Mexican-Israeli entrepreneur Isaac Assa.
