= Tecamachalco, Naucalpan =

Neighbourhood in Naucalpan, Mexico

Tecamachalco is the common name for the State of Mexico upper-middle and upper-class suburban neighbourhood, colonia Lomas de Tecamachalco, which forms part of the city of Naucalpan, in Naucalpan and Huixquilucan municipalities, in the State of Mexico.

== Geography ==
The neighbourhood lies along Avenida de los Bosques and Avenida de las Fuentes. Tecamachalco is bordered by:

- on the southwest, the Universidad Anahuac and the Interlomas area
- on the northeast, colonias Lomas Hipódromo and across the border in the Federal District, that is, Mexico City proper, the Hipódromo de las Américas
- on the southeast, colonia Bosques de las Lomas in Mexico City proper
- on the northwest, the colonias Lomas Anahuac and La Herradura, also in the city of Naucalpan within Huixquilucan municipality.

There is a small commercial village where folks can come in and buy things in this otherwise residential area.

== Demographics ==
Approximately 3,300 families live in Tecamachalco, heavily skewed towards older residents, and about 40% is Jewish.

=== Jewish community ===
The intersection of Avenida de las Fuentes and Fuente de la Templanza is referred to by residents as the Distrito Federal's Little Tel Aviv. On Friday night or Saturday morning, many Jewish residents walk to the temple, some men in hats and women in wigs.

Jewish shops include the "Kosher Palace" store, which plays Israeli music and sells spices from Israel, halva, Israeli chocolate spread, New York pretzels, football-size jars of pickles, frozen schnitzel, falafel, and a wide variety of kosher products. The Shuky Centre is a multi-story kosher food hall with separate sections for meat and milk, selling shawarma, sushi, kosher Mexican food, Syrian lavash bread, kosher chicken, and challot. Other Jewish shops include the Sinai Deli and Bakery, Sastreria Saul, butcher shops, and kosher taquerias.

There are Jewish schools and at least six synagogues and temples, which are unmarked. The Mexican-Israeli entrepreneur Isaac Assa, head of Grupo Assa and president of the ILAN Foundation, spent his childhood and youth in this neighbourhood.
