= Francisca Nuñez de Carabajal =

Victim of the Inquisition

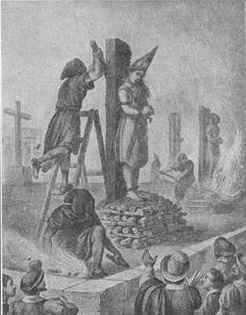
Execution of Mariana de Carabajal at Mexico, from El Libro Rojo, 1870

Francisca Nuñez de Carabajal (Portuguese: Francisca Nunes de Carvalhal) (ca. 1540, Portugal – 8 December 1596, Mexico City) was a Marrana (Crypto-Jew) in New Spain executed by burning at the stake by the Mexican Inquisition for judaizing in 1596.

== Arrival in Mexico ==
In 1579, King Philip II of Spain appointed Don Luis de Carabajal y de la Cueva, a Portuguese New Christian of Jewish descent, as the governor of Nuevo León.

He brought with him to Mexico his brother-in-law, Don Francisco Rodríguez de Matos, and his sister, Doña Francisca Nuñez de Carabajal, with eight of their nine children: Doña Isabel (the oldest, 25 years of age, widow of Gabriel de Herrera), Doña Catalina, Doña Mariana, Doña Leonor, Don Baltasar, Don Luis, Miguel and Anica (the last two being very young). Another son, Gaspar, a pious young man, perhaps a monk, in the convent of Santo Domingo, Mexico, had arrived a short time before. Doña Catalina and Doña Leonor married respectively Antonio Diaz de Caceres (see Caceres family) and Jorge de Almeida—two Spanish merchants residing in Mexico City and interested in the Taxco mines. The entire family then removed to the capital, where, in the year 1590, while in the midst of prosperity, and seemingly leading Christian lives, they were seized by the Inquisition.

Her son Luis, who had attended Jesuit school, had been unaware of his family's Jewish roots until his brother Baltasar told him when he was thirteen years old.

== Auto-da-fé ==
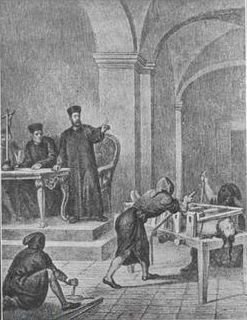
Torture of Francisca de Carabajal at Mexico, from El Libro Rojo, 1870

The eldest, Doña Isabel, was tortured until she implicated the whole of the Carabajal family. The whole family was forced to confess and abjure at a public Auto-da-fé, celebrated on Saturday, 24 February 1590. Francisca was the only one tortured, taking five rounds on the string rack.

Luis de Carabajal the younger, with his mother and four sisters, was condemned to perpetual imprisonment, and his brother, Baltasar, who had fled upon the first warning of danger, was, along with his deceased father Francisco Rodriguez de Matos, burnt in effigy. In January 1595, Doña Francisca and her children were accused of a relapse into Judaism and convicted.

On 8 December 1596, the entire family of Luis de Carabajal was burned at the stake, including Francisca.

== Relapse ==
During their imprisonment they were able to communicate with one another with Spanish pear seeds, on which they wrote messages of encouragement to remain true to their faith. They were found out and at the resulting auto-da-fé, Doña Francisca and her children, Isabel, Catalina, Leonor, and Luis, were burned at the stake, together with Manuel Díaz, Beatriz Enríquez, Diego Enríquez, and Manuel de Lucena, being accused of relapsos, term used to those repeatedly accused of judaizing. Of her other children, Doña Mariana, who lost her reason for a time, was tried and put to death at an auto-da-fé held in Mexico City on 25 March 1601; Anica, the youngest child, being reconciled at the same time.

== Sources ==
- Riva Palacio, Vicente (1870). El Libro Rojo (in Spanish). Mexico. OCLC 5395049.
- Landis, C. K. (1894). Carabajal the Jew, a Legend of Monterey. Vineland, N. J. OCLC 2325423.
