= Luis de Carvajal the Younger =

Crypto-Jewish writer and martyr (d. 1596)

Luis de Carvajal the Younger (Spanish: Luis de Carvajal el Mozo, c. 1566 – 8 December 1596) was a Spanish-born Crypto-Jewish writer. He was the nephew of the conquistador Luis de Carvajal y de la Cueva, who was the governor of Nuevo León (Spanish: Nuevo Reino de León), and was brought to Mexico at a young age. In Mexico, he began to practice Judaism in secret alongside his family, and additionally kept memoirs of his life. His writings are the earliest known to be written by a Jew in the Americas. He was executed as a martyr of the Jewish faith by the Spanish Inquisition in 1596.

== Early life ==
Luis de Carvajal the Younger was born into a family of conversos in Benavente, Spain, around 1566 or 1567. His parents were Francisco Rodriguez de Mattos and Francisca Núñez de Carvajal. He was the fifth of nine children, and had five sisters: Isabel, Leonor, Catalina, Mariana, and Ana (Note: This individual's name is varyingly transcribed as Ana or Anica. For instance, Arnold Wiznitzer in his article "Crypto-Jews in Mexico during the Sixteenth Century" gives her name as Anica, and then in his article "Crypto-Jews in Mexico during the Seventeenth Century" gives her name as Ana.), and three brothers: Baltasar, Miguel, and Gaspar. His parents were both born in Mogadouro, Portugal. His uncle on his mother's side, Luis de Carvajal y de la Cueva, was a conquistador named as a governor of Nuevo León. The elder Luis de Carvajal may have heard suspicions of his sister's family practicing Judaism in secret, and brought them to New Spain, possibly hoping to save them from the worst of the Inquisition. His family arrived in New Spain at the port of Tampico in 1580, and stayed in Pánuco. Carvajal accompanied his uncle on his political missions; his brother Gaspar did not live in Pánuco, but rather lived in Mexico City, then the capital of New Spain. Carvajal accompanied his father to Mexico City to sell indigenous slaves; when his father died, Luis returned to Pánuco.

Carvajal studied at a Jesuit school. He was introduced to his family's tradition of secretly practicing Judaism on Yom Kippur around the age of thirteen. According to his memoirs, he received a Bible, after reading it, he circumcised himself with a pair of old scissors. He joined the rest of his family, with the exception of his brother Gaspar, who became a Franciscan friar, in practicing Jewish faith in secret. Carvajal spoke no Hebrew and knew little about Jewish tradition; his isolation from the rest of the Jewish world led him to practice a syncretic form of Judaism and Christianity.

== Arrest ==
In 1589, his sister Isabel was denounced as a Judaizer (the term used in the Spanish Inquisition for crypto-Jews practicing Judaism in secret), and was tortured until she gave up the names of her family and several others. Luis de Carvajal was detained for Judaizing alongside his family. His uncle, who had already been arrested on suspicions of being descended from New Christians, died in prison, and his mother and sisters were sent to a convent. Carvajal was sent to teach Latin to indigenous men. Two of his brothers, Baltasar and Miguel, had managed to escape from Mexico before they could be arrested and made their way first to Spain, then to Italy; Miguel eventually settled in Salonica and became a rabbi. He began writing his autobiography in 1591, with the last entry dated to October 1594. He also wrote under the pseudonym José Lumbroso, or "Joseph the Enlightened". The memoirs that he kept were very small, possibly that size in order to hide in his hat.

Undeterred by his arrest, he became the leader of a secret Jewish community. When he was arrested again in February of 1595, alongside his mother and several sisters, he refused to incriminate them in Judaizing. However, in February 1596, he was tortured, and revealed the names of 120 other crypto-Jews, including his mother and sisters. In shame, he tried to kill himself, but could not do so.

== Death ==
Luis de Carvajal the Younger was executed by garrote, then burnt at the stake on 8 December 1596, in an auto da fe in Mexico City. He was about 30 years old. His mother Francisca and sisters Catalina, Isabel, and Leonor were executed on the same day. According to one contemporary source, upon witnessing the execution of his mother and two of his sisters, he had a mental breakdown and converted to Catholicism just before his death; however, there is ambiguity over whether the source is reliable.

His sisters, Ana and Mariana, were not executed with their brother, and Mariana was "reconciled" into the Catholic faith. Mariana was accused of relapsing to Judaism and was executed by garrote and then burnt at the stake on 25 March 1601, at twenty-nine years of age, in an auto da fe, whereas Ana was "reconciled" at the same auto da fe. Ana was also accused of practicing Judaism in secret, and was garroted and subsequently burnt at the stake in April 1649, at about seventy years of age, (Note: Sources vary on the birthdate of Ana de Carvajal. Garcia-Riquelme lists her birthdate as 1581. Arnold Wiznitzer writes in "Crypto-Jews in Mexico during the Seventeenth Century" that she was sixty-seven at the time of her death, putting her birthdate at around 1582. However, when listing the members of the Carvajal family, he lists the youngest child, "Anica" - almost certainly Ana - as a member of the family who had arrived in 1580 in Tampico in his article "Crypto-Jews in Mexico during the Sixteenth Century." Samuel Temkin in "Luis de Carvajal and His People" lists her birthdate as 1579, which would mean she was about seventy at the time of her death.) in an auto da fe in Mexico City.

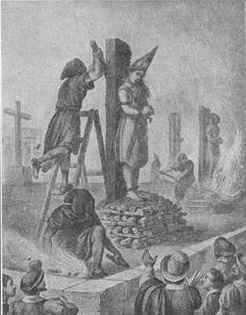
A depiction of the execution of Mariana de Carvajal, Luis de Carvajal's sister. Published in 1870.

== Legacy ==
Carvajal's writings are the earliest known writings from a Jew in the New World, as such, they have posed great interest to historians. His memoirs were stored in the national archives of Mexico until 1932, when they disappeared for unexplained reasons. They were recovered in 2016 by Leonard L. Milberg and restored to the archives.

Ilan Stavans dramatises Luis de Carvajal the Younger's life and struggle as part of his work El Illuminado.

The writer Sabina Berman's play En el nombre de Dios (In the Name of God) dramatizes the lives of the Carvajal family.

The movie El Santo Oficio (1974) directed by Mexican director Arturo Ripstein features aspects of his and the Carvajal family's life during the inquistion process.
