= Adolph Achille Gereau =

U.S. Virgin Islands civil servant

Adolph Achille Gereau (December 20, 1893 – May 24, 1994) was a United States Virgin Islands civil servant who was the principal founder of the Republican Club and one of the committee of founders of the Republican Party of the United States Virgin Islands.

== Early life and family ==
Gereau was born on December 20, 1893, in Charlotte Amalie, St. Thomas, then Danish West Indies. His father was Mederic Gereau, of mixed parentage; Mederic's father was white and his mother was Black. Mederic Gereau was a mariner, a boat captain and steam engine mechanic from the island of Guadeloupe, French West Indies. Adolph Gereau's mother Diana Beale was mostly Black, and born on the island of Anegada in the British Virgin Islands. The Beales, Diana's parents Samuel Beale and Frances Creque lived at the Settlement on Anegada had a general store and an animal pen where they traded in livestock. Mederic Gereau broke up with his wife and relocated to the Dominican Republic where some of his relatives had previously moved. Mederic Gereau did steam engine maintenance for the Dominican sugar centrals eventually dying there.

Although mostly Black, Adolph Gereau was adopted at the age of 11 in 1905 by a white family resident in Charlotte Amalie, the Ffrenches. Marie Leonides Galiber Ffrench and her husband Gustav Augustus Ffrench operated a commercial warehouse and stevedoring contracting firm. Ffrenches' second wife was Esther Levy-Maduro, who, though a Catholic convert herself, was of an illustrious Sephardic Jewish family. The Gereau and Ffrench families have been in communication since that time.

One of Gereau's foster brothers, Leopold Adelbert Augustus Ffrench, moved to Mexico, and a grandson, Leonardo I. Ffrench, serving in the diplomatic corps, eventually became the director general of the Institute for Mexicans Abroad of the Secretaria de Relaciones Exteriores.

Gereau's wife was Annetta Brewster Gereau of Black, Asian Indian and white descent, a seamstress and herbalist active in the Episcopal Church. Her sister Louise Brewster Siebenhoven was grandmother of Michael S. Fields, at one point president of Oracle USA. The Gereaus had three children, Iva Liston Gereau, Edith Mercedes Gereau and Gustave Adolph Gereau.

== Career ==
Gereau was educated in the islands' Catholic School system and received an associate's degree in Accounting by correspondence from the Pace Accountancy Institute, forerunner to the Pace University.

During a varied civil service career, he was a Danish police officer, acting commissioner of public safety, and deputy United States inspector for the Immigration and Naturalization Service in charge of the U.S. Virgin Islands. He was part of the official welcoming party at the visit of aviator Charles Lindbergh.

The officious character Police Officer Adolphus in the 1939 novel Star Spangled Virgin by DuBose Heyward is a humorous interpretation of his personality. Gereau hosted Heyward when he visited on a cruise in 1937.

Gereau spent most of his career as either assistant or acting commissioner of public safety. He was also deputized as the inspector of immigration for the Virgin Islands. Gereau was one of the first Blacks to go through the same training as an FBI agent, in a program offering training to senior police officers from cooperating departments.

Before his civil service career, he also worked as a boilermaker's apprentice with the West India Corporation, a division of the Danish East Asiatic Company, and as ship's steward with Hamburg America Line.

Gereau moonlighted as a merchant clerk with Cyril Daniel, who served as honorary consul for France and Haiti, and as fiscal agent for Sténio Vincent.

Gereau also worked for the St. Thomas branch of Paiewonsky Hermanos of the Dominican Republic cousins of Ralph Moses Paiewonsky.

An article Gereau wrote on a riot in Charlotte Amalie by Southern white sailors from the U.S. Navy in 1924 was given prominent coverage in the U.S. press.

He also wrote to Calvin Coolidge requesting permission to form a Republican club to help lobby for greater respect for the islanders. He was then invited to become a newspaper reporter with AP, UPI and Associated Negro Press agency. His letter to the editor regarding the extension of eligibility for American citizenship to all citizens of the United States Virgin Islands was published by The New York Times in 1927. In support of his capacity as a journalist he also helped finance his colleague Ariel Melchior founding publisher of the Virgin Islands Daily News.

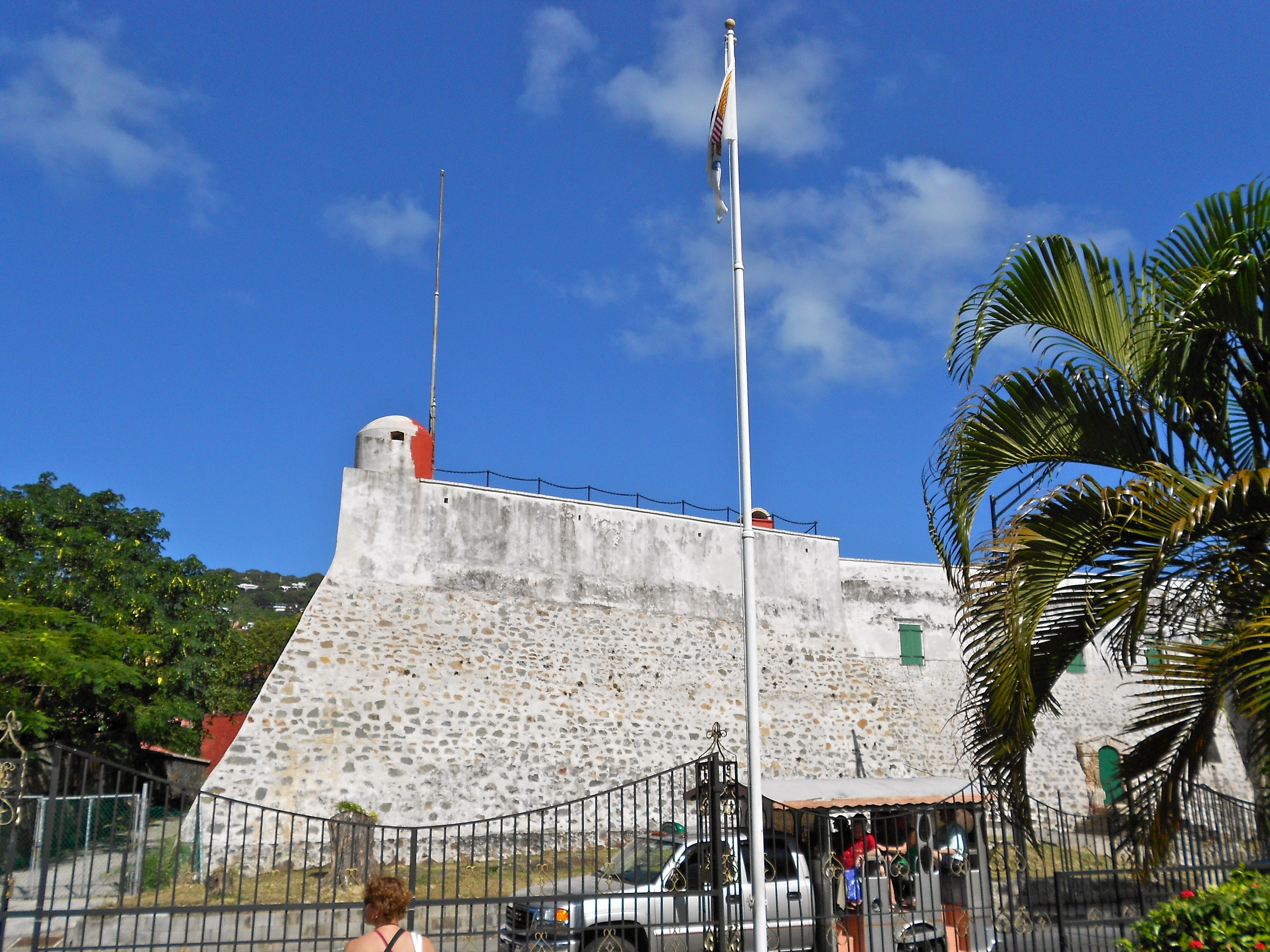
View from the east

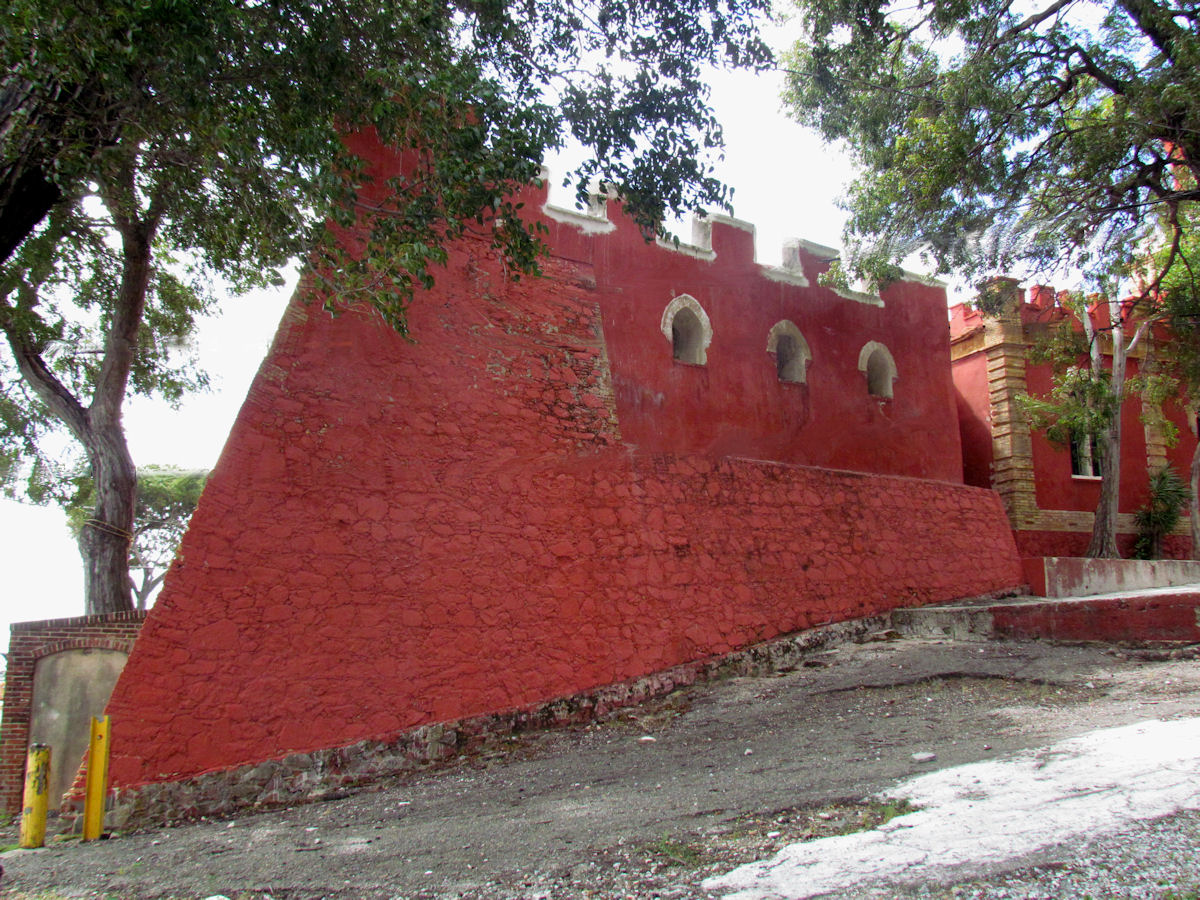
Northeast bastion

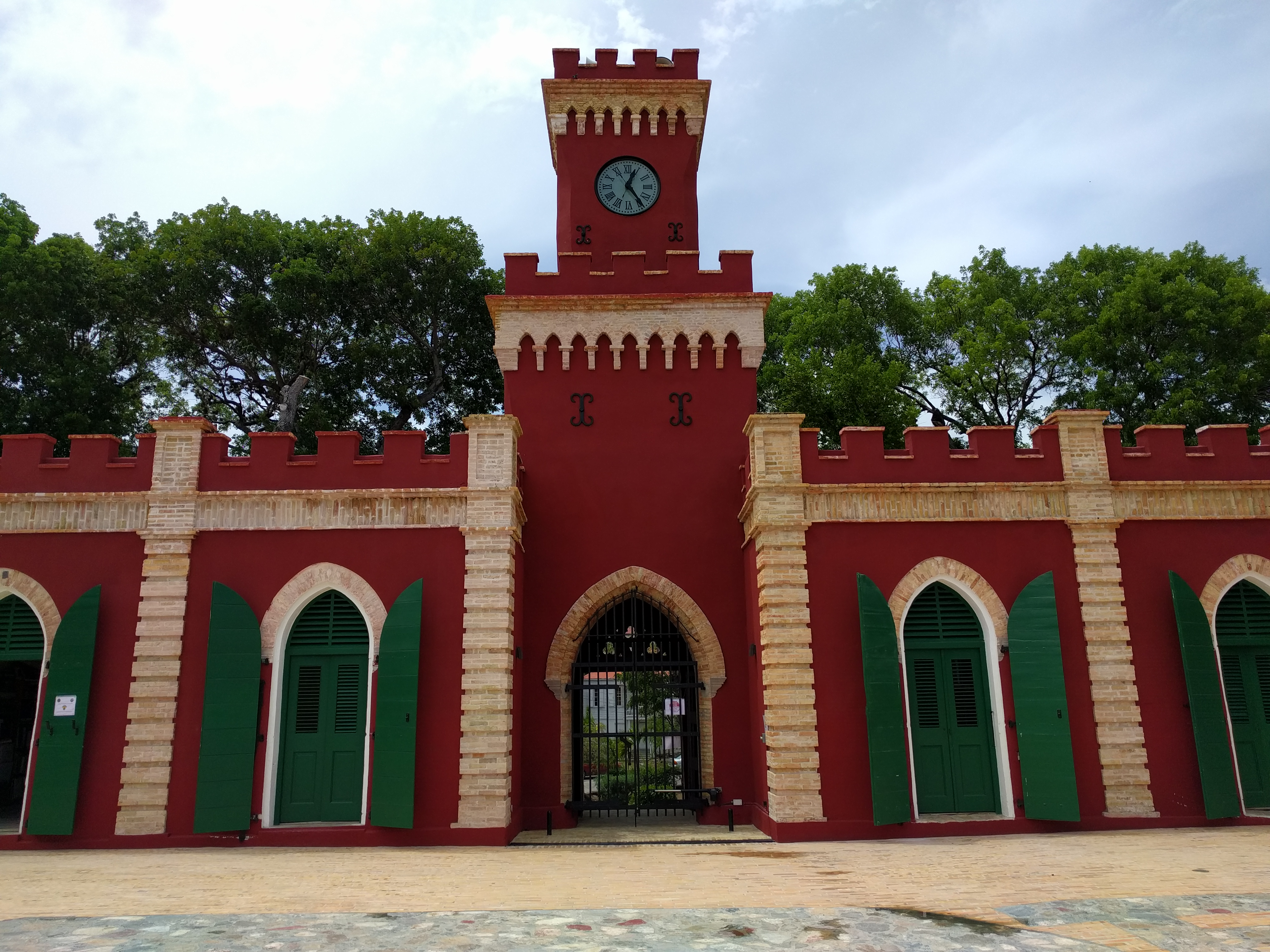
Fort Christian, May 2017

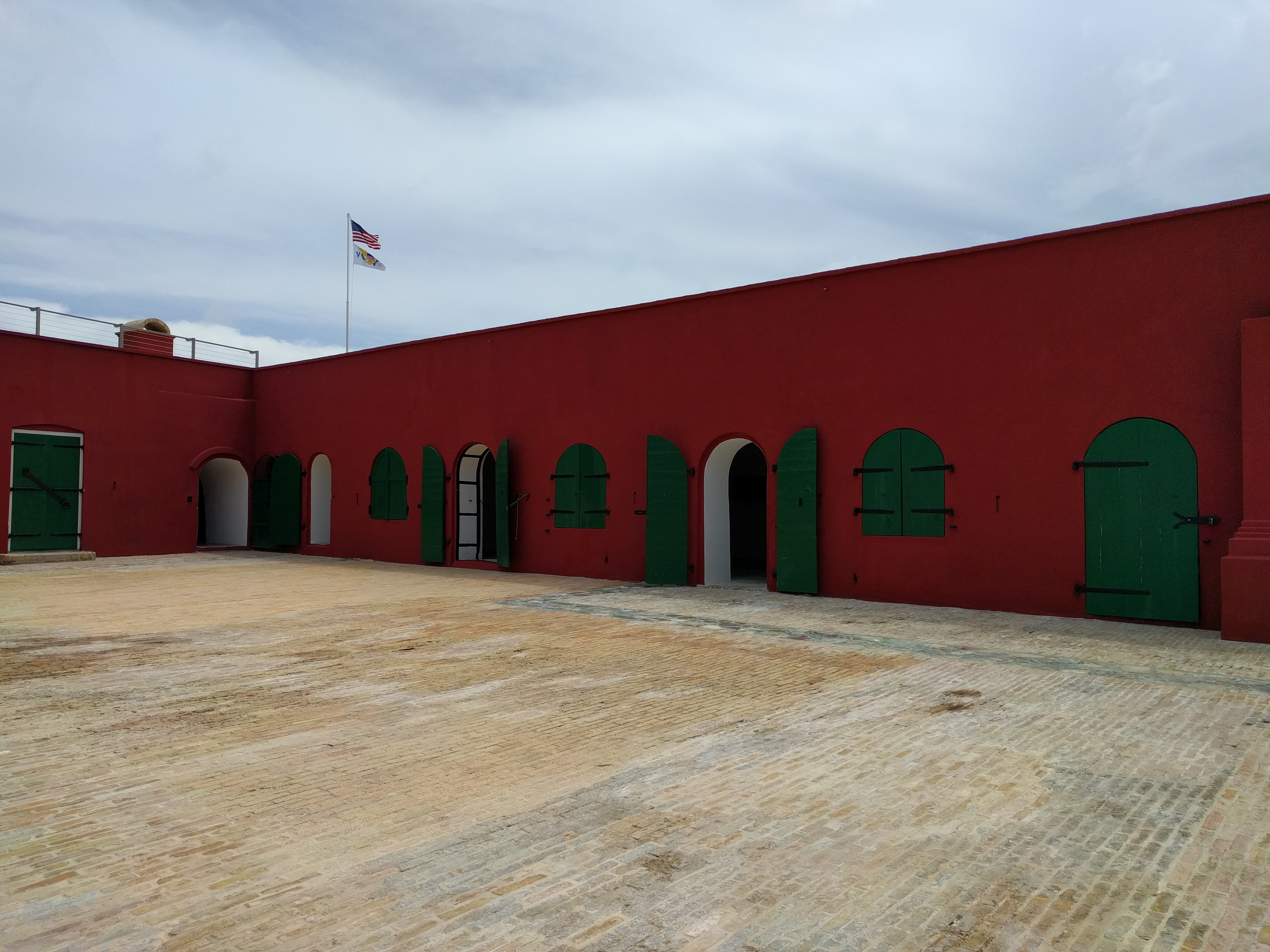
Fort Christian, May 2017

Most of Gereau's professional work was done from an office at Fort Christian.

After moving to St. Croix on his retirement in 1959, he served as a volunteer with the Catholic Church, and was director of the St. Croix, Virgin Islands chapter of the Red Cross.

Gereau died on May 24, 1994, in Christiansted, St. Croix.

== Sources ==
Under Google Books and Google News Archive:

- Adolph Gereau as Immigration Inspector
- Adolph Achille Gereau SSDI Record
- Adolph Gereau in NAACP Records
- Reply to a letter from Gereau by the Dept of the Interior
- Daily News: Gereau reappointed as Acting Commissioner
- Charles Lindbergh visits St. Thomas meets Adolph Gereau
