= Francisco de la Torre Galindo =

Mexican diplomat (born 1972)

Francisco de la Torre Galindo (Mexico City, October 17, 1972) is a Mexican diplomat who has served in the Mexican Foreign Service since 1998. In August 2025, he was appointed by President Claudia Sheinbaum and unanimously ratified by the Permanent Commission of the Mexican Congress as Ambassador Extraordinary and Plenipotentiary of Mexico to Indonesia, with concurrent accreditation to Timor-Leste. He presented a copy of his Letters of Credence to Ambassador Andy Rachmianto on October 15, 2025 and subsequently presented his Letters of Credence to President Prabowo Subianto on November 7, 2025. On April 8, 2026, he presented his Letters of Credence to the Secretary-General of ASEAN, Dr. Kao Kim Hourn.

He previously served as Consul General of Mexico in Dallas (2016-2025), where he was widely recognized for his interest in defending the rights of the Mexican community residing abroad. Under his leadership, between 2019 and 2022, the Consulate General of Mexico in Dallas was the Mexican consular office that processed the largest quantity of Mexican passports and matrículas consulares. Between 2016 and early 2024, he made the Consulate General of Mexico in Dallas the consular office that sent the most submissions for voter credentials to the Instituto Nacional Electoral.

He has a degree in Law (JD) from the National Autonomous University of Mexico (1992-1996). He has been recognized as a distinguished alumnus of UNAM and was interviewed in 2026 by its Alumni and Retired Academics Outreach Program to highlight his professional trajectory in public service and his role as a representative of Mexico abroad. He was part of his university team, representing Mexico in the Philip C. Jessup International Law Moot Court Competition (1995). De la Torre completed a Master's degree in Diplomatic Studies (1998-1999) at the Instituto Matías Romero, from which he graduated with the thesis "Considerations on the vote of Mexicans abroad."

== Mexican Foreign Service ==
At the Secretariat of Foreign Affairs, he served as Legal Director in the General Directorate of Foreign Service and Human Resources (2000-2001) and as Director for South America (2005-2007). Prior to his appointment as Consul General in Dallas, he served as Executive Director of the Institute for Mexicans Abroad (2013-2016).

As for his assignments abroad, he was appointed to the Mexican embassies in Brazil (2001-2005) and in Argentina (2007-2013) where he carried out political and consular duties.

He has been a speaker in countries such as Argentina, Brazil, France, Canada, Colombia, Chile, Belgium, Indonesia and Venezuela, as well as in 25 cities in the United States. In February 2016, he presented the thematic session “Mexico and its Mexican Communities Abroad” before the plenary session of the Commission on Migration Affairs of the Organization of American States.

In the aftermath of the Secretary of Foreign Affairs Juan Ramón de la Fuente's visit to Dallas, de la Torre Galindo was interviewed by Joaquín López Dóriga, Ciro Gómez Leyva and José Cárdenas regarding the strategy to be implemented by the Secretariat of Foreign Affairs concerning the protection and safeguarding of the human rights of Mexican migrants residing in the U.S. in respect of the implementation of the Trump administration in January 2025.

=== Defender of the rights of Mexican migrants abroad ===
As the Consul General of Mexico in Dallas, he has implemented various initiatives to benefit the Mexican community living in north Texas:

- In 2023, he signed an alliance with the Occupational Safety and Health Administration for a period of two years, to disseminate information in accordance with the Occupational Safety and Health Act to Mexican workers, especially those who work in construction.
- He coordinated the donation of Mexican textbooks to the Dallas Independent School District.
- He inaugurated the Defense Center of the Mexican Consulate in Dallas, in order to provide legal advice and representation to Mexican immigrants under the restrictive immigration policies implemented during the presidency of Donald Trump.
- He constantly outreaches to community leaders from different parts of Mexico that live in United States, with the intention of joining efforts to bring consular services closer to the Mexican community residing in north Texas.

=== Actions taken during COVID-19 pandemic ===
During the COVID-19 pandemic, the Consul General Francisco de la Torre, helped county authorities to increase the registration of the Hispanic population to receive vaccines, since the consular office is considered a trusted institution for the migrant community.

Consul de la Torre also coordinated the donation of food products by Mexican companies in the food industry based in Dallas for the Dallas Independent School District, benefiting more than 155,000 Mexican households.

== Boards ==
- Between 2022 and 2025, he was a member of the Advisory Board of the International Center of The University of Texas at Dallas.
- Between 2019 and 2025, he was the dean of the Executive Committee of the Consular Corps of Dallas and Fort Worth to the World Affairs Council of Dallas Fort Worth.
- Between 2021 and 2025, he was a member of the Board of Governors of the Dallas Symphony Orchestra.

== Awards and recognitions ==
- In 2023 he received the Maestro Award from Latino Leaders Magazine for outstanding community service.
- In 2017 he was awarded the Latino Advocate award by D CEO magazine and the Mexican Entrepreneurs Association.
- In 2017 he was recognized as Global Diplomat of the Year by The Global Chamber Dallas.
- In 2017, the Ana G. Mendez University System presented him with the President's Medal for his dedication to Hispanics in North Texas.

== Academic publications ==
- "A personal journey, a shared future: Mexico and Indonesia in a new era of partnership", The Jakarta Post.
- In Casa de México of the Institute for Mexicans Abroad, he co-wrote "La patria a la distancia... ser anfitriones desde lejos"
- In Este País, he co-wrote "La red consular mexicana en Estados Unidos: ¿reconquista o fortalecimiento institucional?".
- In the Anuario Mexicano de Relaciones Internacionales of the Facultad de Estudios Superiores de Acatlán (2025) he co-wrote “Modernización e inclusión de la red consular en EE. UU. como parte integral de la política exterior mexicana”.
- “Mexican Diplomacy in Texas” in the book The International Relations of California and Texas with Mexico and the World (2023).
- In the magazine Voz y Voto 368 (2023) he co-authored “Contigo a la distancia”, a short text on the electoral process held in 2023 in the Mexican consular offices for Coahuila's and Estado de Mexico's governor elections.
- In the Anuario Mexicano de Relaciones Internacionales of the Facultad de Estudios Superiores de Acatlán (2022) he co-wrote “Diplomacia consular todoterreno”.
- In Foreign Affairs Latin America 19, no. 3 (July 2019 – October 2019) he co-wrote “The vote of Mexicans abroad”.
- He coordinated the Revista Mexicana de Política Exterior 107 (May–August 2016) of the Instituto Matías Romero, where he presented the article “Evolución en la atención a las comunidades mexicanas en el exterior” as co-author.
