= Consulate-General of Mexico, Dallas =

Diplomatic mission of Mexico in Dallas, Texas, United States

Coordinates: 32.8163°N 96.8635°W

Consulate General of Mexico in Dallas
- Consulado General de México en Dallas
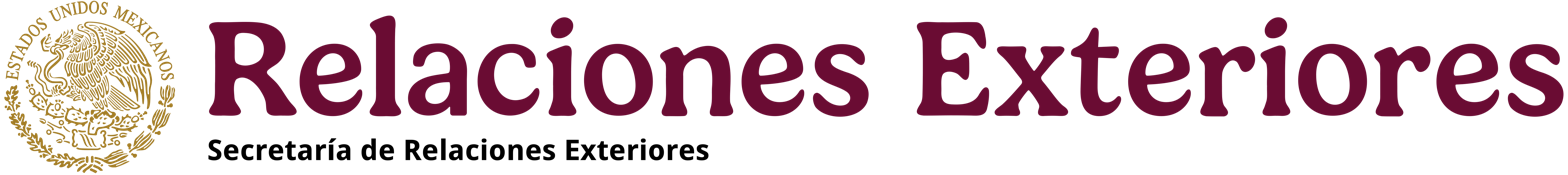

- Incumbent; Francisco de la Torre Galindo since June 1st, 2016
- Website: https://consulmex.sre.gob.mx/dallas/index.php

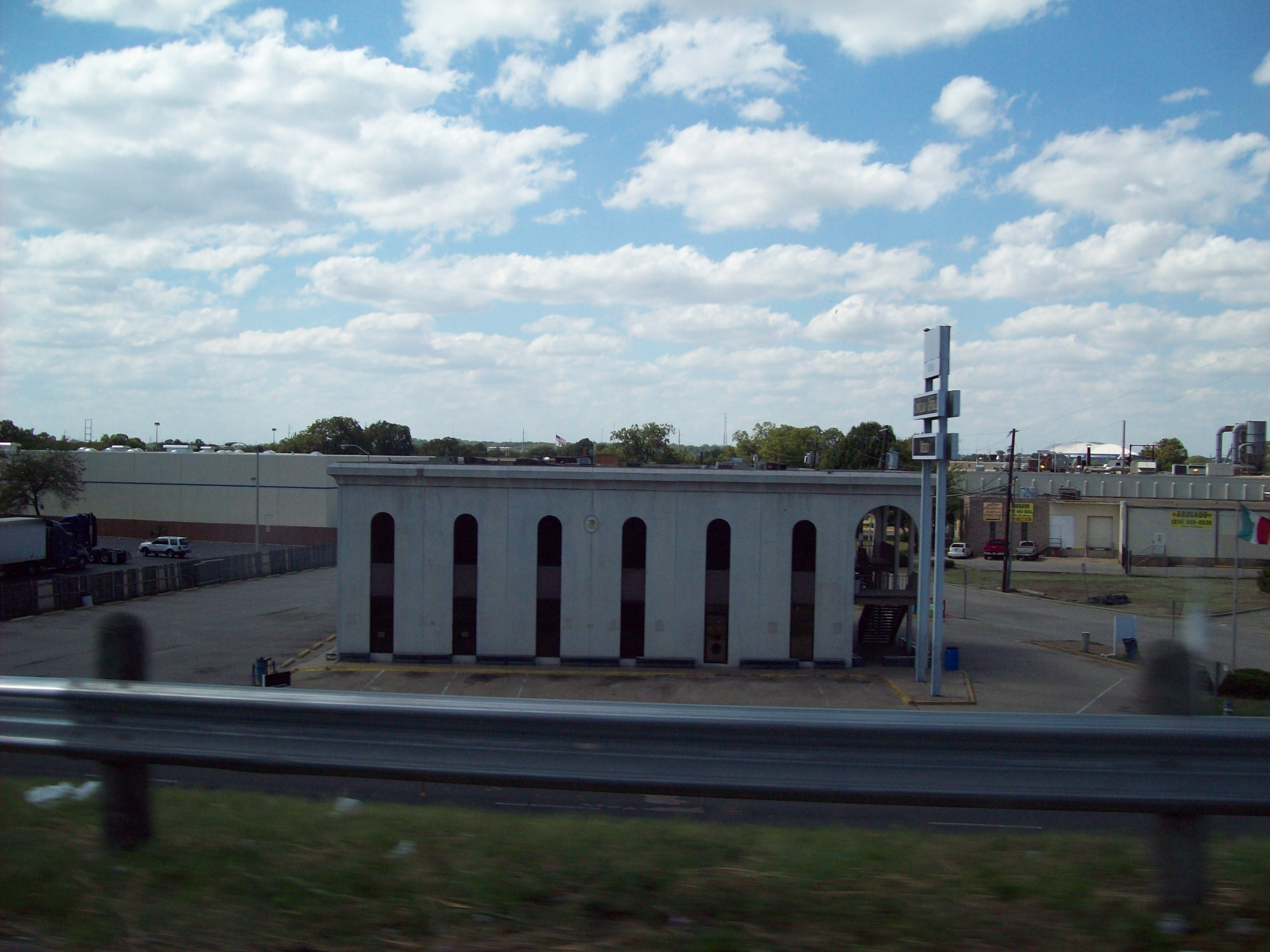
Former facility of the Consulate-General of Mexico in Dallas at 8855 North Stemmons Freeway

The Consulate-General of Mexico in Dallas (Spanish: Consulado-General de México en Dallas) is a diplomatic mission of Mexico in Dallas, Texas, United States. It was established in 1920 and it currently covers 82 counties in North Texas.

In June 2024, it was one of the voting locations approved by the National Electoral Institute for the 2024 Mexican general election.

Between 2019 and 2022, the Consulate-General of Mexico in Dallas was the Mexican consular office that processed the largest quantity of Mexican passports and matrículas consulares.

In 2009, Alfredo Corchado of The Dallas Morning News called it the thirdmost important Mexican consulate after Los Angeles and Chicago's, in terms of activity and Mexican population size. It moved from 8855 North Stemmons Freeway to 1210 River Bend Drive that January.

On May 6, 2009, lawyers for four residents filed a class action lawsuit in the Dallas County District Court, partially alleging "corruption and greed" in the consulate. That August, the Mexican government announced the removal of consul-general Enrique Hubbard Urrea from his post due to corruption.

== Consul General ==
Under President Claudia Sheinbaum:

- Francisco de la Torre Galindo (2016-current)

Under President Andrés Manuel López Obrador:

- Francisco de la Torre Galindo (2016-current)

Under President Enrique Peña Nieto:

- Francisco de la Torre Galindo (2016-current)
- José Octavio Tripp Villanueva (2013-2016)

Under President Felipe Calderón:

- Juan Carlos Cué Vega (2009-2012)
- Enrique Hubbard Urrea (2006-2009)

Under President Vicente Fox:

- Enrique Hubbard Urrea (2006-2009)
- Carlos Eugenio García de Alba Zepeda (2004-2006)
- Ezequiel Padilla Couttolenc (2001-2004)

== See also ==
- List of diplomatic missions of Mexico
