= Talking Book World =

American retail chain

Talking Book World Corporation
- Industry: Retail
- Founded: August 19, 1993; 32 years ago
- Founders: Tyrone Pereira; Richard Simtob
- Defunct: 2010; 16 years ago (United States); 2014; 12 years ago (Canada)
- Fate: Dissolved
- Headquarters: Southfield, Michigan, U.S.
- Area served: United States; Canada
- Products: Audiobooks
- Website: talkingbookworld.com (2006 archive)

Talking Book World was an American retail chain which sold and rented audiobooks on CDs and cassette tapes. Headquartered in Southfield, Michigan, the chain operated more than 45 stores across eight U.S. states and Canada at its peak. It was among the largest U.S. chains specializing in audiobooks.

== History ==
In 1993, Canadian-American entrepreneur Richard Simtob and his friend Tyrone Pereira were researching business ideas, when they stumbled upon an article in Entrepreneur magazine discussing audiobooks, then an emerging market. The two decided to enter the market, founding Talking Book World on August 19, 1993, and opening the chain's first store, in West Bloomfield, Michigan, that October.

Franchised locations began to open in 1995, allowing the chain to begin national and international expansion, starting with stores in California and Ontario. By 1999, the chain had 33 locations, of which 16 were franchised. That year, the company was named by Inc. as one of the fastest-growing private companies in the United States. The chain sought to establish 100 locations by 2000, and 1000 by 2005. Its growth was aided by the closure of its largest national competitor, Austin-based Earful of Books, in April 2002.

Simtob resigned from the company in June 2001. He then joined cellphone retailer Wireless Toyz as an executive, among other franchising ventures.

Through the mid-2000s, many of the chain's stores closed, while some franchised locations left the chain and became independent retailers. The company's mail-order rental business was rebranded as Audio To Go in April 2003.

In 2007, the chain's website was replaced with a notice stating that the company had discontinued operations in the United States. The notice directed customers to the Audio To Go website for online rentals, and to a separate website for the Canadian division. A different entity, Talking Book World Investments, Inc., was created in 2007, and relaunched the U.S. website at a different address in 2008.

There are limited sources detailing the ultimate fate of the company. By 2008, only two Talking Book World locations remained in the United States, both in Metro Detroit. The U.S. retail chain's website went offline in 2010, as did the Audio To Go website in 2013. The Canadian retail chain continued to operate in Toronto through October 2014, when its website also went offline.

== Retail model ==
While Talking Book World's stores offered audiobooks for purchase, the majority of the company's sales came from rentals. In a manner similar to Netflix, the chain offered a subscription-based model, in which a member paid a monthly charge for unlimited rentals. Basic plans allowed subscribers to borrow one title at a time, with no set due dates or late fees, while upgraded tiers permitted up to six titles to be borrowed at once. The chain offered rentals in its brick-and-mortar stores and by mail, with the latter business later known as Audio To Go.

Talking Book World's business model was cited in patent litigation between Blockbuster and Netflix in 2007.

== Business-to-business sales ==
In addition to retail sales, Talking Book World also supplied libraries with its audiobooks. The company also served corporate libraries, with claimed clients including Comerica, Xerox, and DaimlerChrysler.
