= Juan Hernandez (political advisor) =

American political advisor

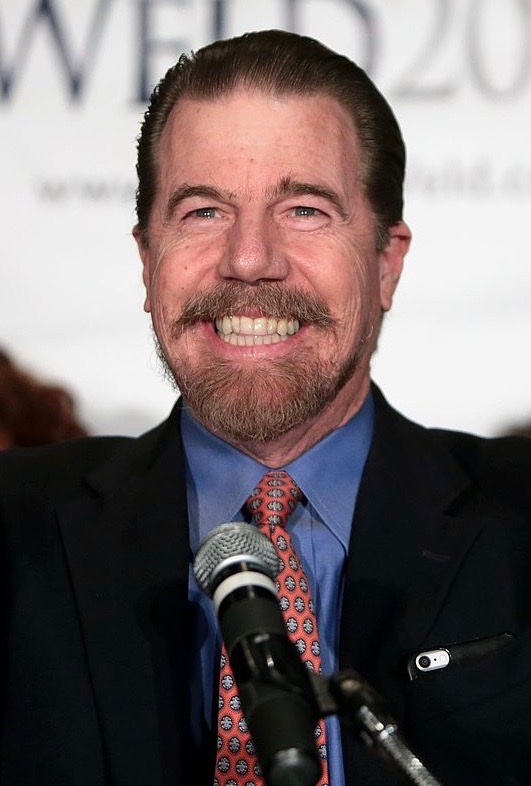
Hernandez speaking at a rally for Gary Johnson in Phoenix, Arizona, 2016

Juan Hernandez is an American political advisor and an expert in Mexico–United States relations. Hernandez has advised many leaders in State and Federal Governments in the United States, Mexico and Latin America including George W. Bush, Vicente Fox and John McCain.

== Biography ==
Hernandez was born in Fort Worth, Texas, from a long line of Texans from Fort Worth, Burleson and Alvarado. His Mother, Mary Clay Senter went to San Miguel de Allende, Mexico, to study Spanish and Art, and fell in love and married a Mexican law student, Francisco Hernandez. Together they created a Mexican American family dividing their time between Guanajuato and Fort Worth.

Hernandez completed his B.A. at the age of 19 at Lawrence University and his Doctorate at 25 at Texas Christian University (being one of the youngest graduates in the history of both institutions). After teaching at various universities and consulting for international corporations, Hernandez founded a Research Center at the University of Texas at Dallas and advised the UT Chancellor on programs for all UT universities in the Texas system.

Hernandez holds dual citizenship with the United States and Mexico. He was the first American citizen to serve in a Mexican presidential cabinet. He is a co-founder of Hispanic Republicans of Texas, and the group boasts as the largest Republican minority bloc in the country.

Hernandez continues advising international corporations and presidential hopefuls including Felipe Calderon (Mexico) in 2006, John McCain (US) in 2008, Juan Gutierrez (Guatemala) in 2011. In August 2016, Hernandez joined the presidential campaign of Libertarian Party candidate Gary Johnson as the chair of Hispanics for Johnson/Weld. He has written and edited eight books on politics and poetry.

Diplomatic posts
Preceded by Leonardo Ffrench; 1997 to 2000	Executive Director; Institute for Mexicans Abroad; 2000 to 2003	Succeeded by Carlos Gonzalez Gutierrez; 2003 to 2009
