= Driving licence in Mexico =

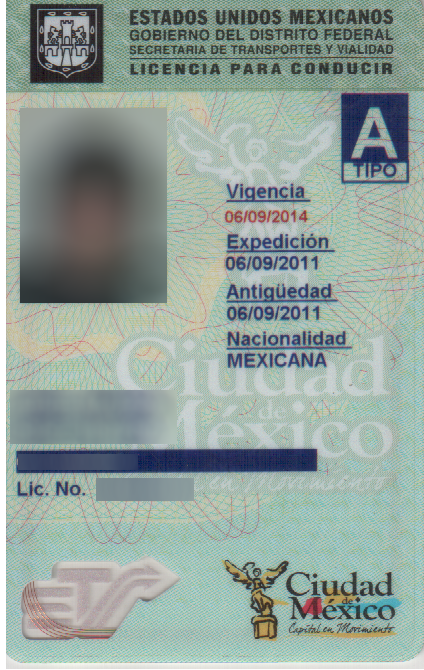
The front of a Mexico City type "A" driving licence (vehicles under 3.5t and motorbikes).

In Mexico, it is each state's responsibility to regulate driving in their respective jurisdiction, and therefore each state issues their own driving licence. Drivers need to demonstrate residence in most states in order to acquire that state's licence, although some offer visitor licenses. All states recognise each other's licence.

== Conditions ==
Mexican citizens and legal residents can only acquire a proper driving licence once they have turned 18, with the typical validity of a licence being 3 years. Minors that are 15 or older can get a driving permit with a validity ranging from 1–6 months (depending on the jurisdiction and type of permit acquired), to 1 year.

== Licence Types ==
In Mexico, each state is responsible for establishing a letter-based classification system on the type of driver licence and the vehicles that the operator is permitted to drive, and the minimum driving age. For example, in Mexico City, the minimum age one can obtain a permit is 15 years, while a full licence without restrictions can be obtained at 18 years.

=== Minor Permit ===
For residents aged between 15 and 18 years old. Driving restrictions may apply, such as speed restrictions, a driving curfew, or special plates. It has a validity of 1 month, 6 months, 1 year or until the minor turns 18, depending on the state issuing the permit or the type of permit acquired. The holder can drive any vehicle intended for 'personal use', such as motorbikes (any type), or cars whose weight does not exceed 3.5 tons.

== Modernisation ==
Currently, most state governments are implementing modern licences with embedded chips. This is to avoid corruption (due to police officers having to scan the licence and input the driving offence into a special machine in order to justify the detention of someone), as well as facilitating the tracking of stolen vehicles, and providing greater security and protection from forging. Currently, the Federal District, Nuevo León, and the Estado de Mexico have implemented a chip into their licences.

== Testing ==
It is up to each individual state to determine the requirements for the acquisition of any of the aforementioned licences. For example, the Federal District considers the driving licence as a method of regulating drivers instead of certifying them, and thus issues licences without any sort of test (drivers must sign a document declaring they can drive). On the other hand, the state of Zacatecas issues a written test to every new driver.

== See also ==
- Unique Population Registry Code (CURP)
- Federal Taxpayer Registry (RFC)
- Voter Credential (INE Card)
