= Bank on California =

Bank on California is an initiative started by California Governor Arnold Schwarzenegger on December 12, 2008, to help Californians open a bank account. The program seeks to encourage financial institutions to relax identification requirements when opening a bank account to include Mexican CID cards and Guatemalan CID cards as well as other CID cards. California mayors were enlisted to promote the program, which currently includes San Francisco, Los Angeles, Oakland, California Capital Region and Inland SoCal.

The program was first announced by Governor Schwarzenegger and former President Bill Clinton in The Wall Street Journal on January 24, 2008. California was lauded as the first state in the nation to start such an initiative and would be coordinated with the Federal Deposit Insurance Corporation. It seeks to draw the "unbanked" into financial institutions with starter accounts whereby it's hoped that bringing more money into the financial system will grow the economy and help the unbanked build wealth.

== Criticism ==
Clinton and Schwarzenegger claim that "it won't cost taxpayers a dime;" however, involving the FDIC and lobbying mayors to rally institutions in their communities translate to utilizing government resources, and someone had to coordinate to get the Bank on California website developed. Others argue it will help California banks to "launder the illicit earnings of millions of illegal aliens," and that "Californians don’t need help opening bank accounts, illegal aliens do."
