= Unified Cargo Processing =

US/Mexican program of cargo inspections

Unified Cargo Processing is a joint program between the U.S. Customs and Border Protection (CBP) and Mexico's Tax Administration Service (SAT in Spanish). The program was officially declared jointly by CBP Commissioner Gil Kerlikowske and SAT Administrator General Ricardo Trevino. Under this program, CBP and SAT conduct joint cargo inspections. The program is intended to reduce wait and clearance times for cargo crossing the U.S. / Mexico border.
