= Carlos González Gutiérrez =

Mexican diplomat

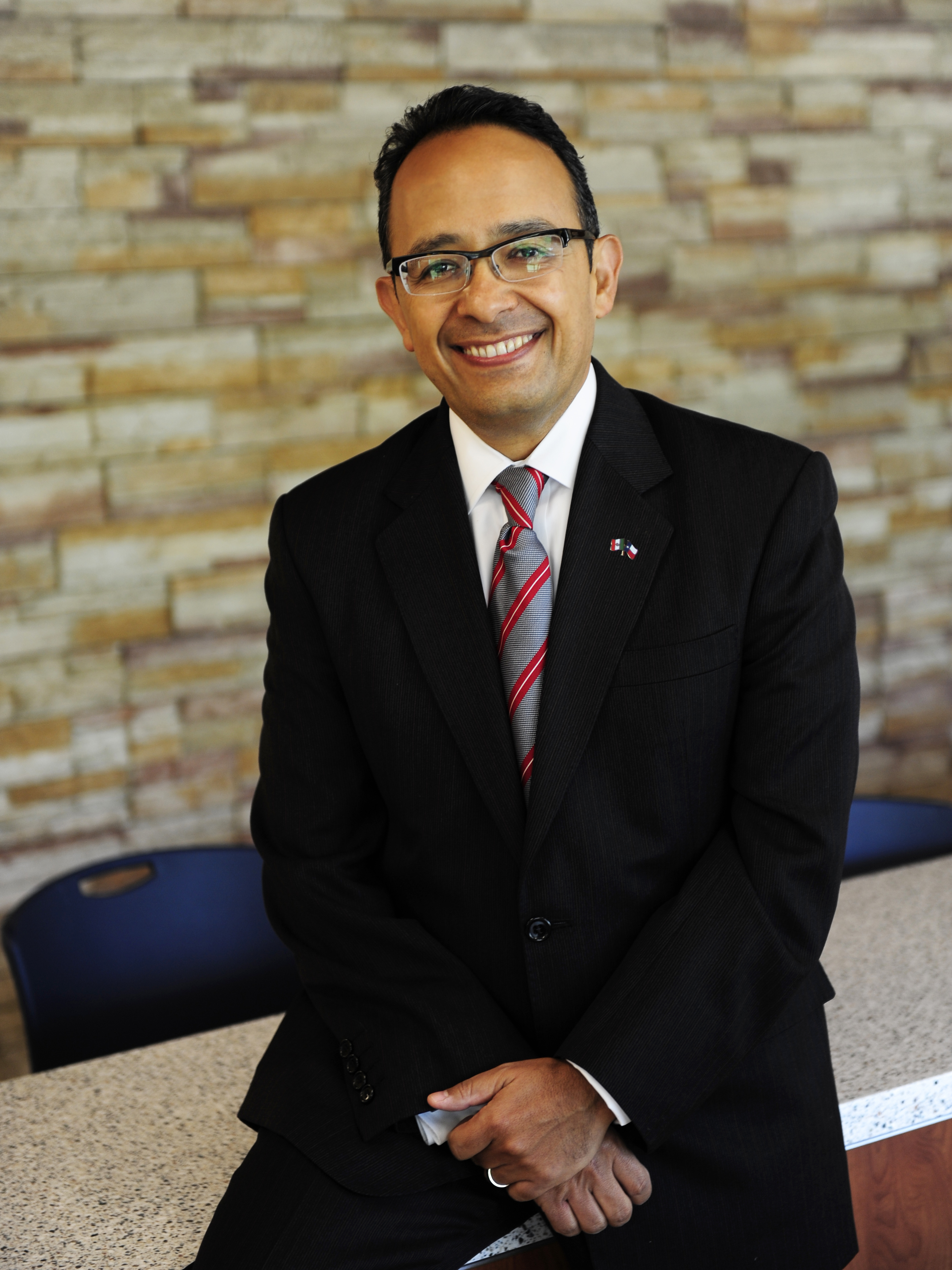
Carlos González Gutiérrez

Ambassador Carlos González Gutiérrez is the Consul General of Mexico in Los Angeles, ratified by the Mexican Senate in December 2023. As a career diplomat since 1987, González Gutiérrez has specialized in Mexican communities in the United States, as all of his designations abroad have been in the US.

== Biography ==
González Gutiérrez has a Bachelor of Arts degree in Foreign Relations from El Colegio de Mexico and a master's degree in Foreign Relations from the School of International Relations at the University of Southern California.

In Mexico, in the late 1990s, he worked in the Program for Mexican Communities Abroad at the Ministry of Foreign Affairs, and from 2003 to 2009, he was the founding executive director of the Institute of Mexicans Abroad, the agency in charge of promoting ties and collaboration between Mexico and its diaspora.

Overseas, he has had four adscriptions. Early in his career, he was the Consul for Community Affairs at the Consulate General of Mexico in Los Angeles. Then, from 1999 to 2003, he was appointed as Counselor for Latino Affairs at the Mexican Embassy in Washington D.C.

In 2009, González Gutiérrez was appointed for the first time Head of Post as Consul General of Mexico in Sacramento. Besides the regular consular activities, he was in charge of monitoring public policies implemented in the state that could affect Mexico or Mexican communities in California, given that Sacramento is the seat of the powers of the state.

After six years in Sacramento, Ambassador González Gutiérrez was transferred to another capital city as Consul General of Mexico in Austin, having to report yet again the public policies of Texas, as much as to look after the daily general services of the Consulate for Mexicans in areas such as documentation, protection and community development.

In September 2011, he was promoted by the President of Mexico to the rank of Ambassador.

From 2019 to 2023 González Gutiérrez served as Consul General of Mexico in San Diego.

In December 2023, the Legislative Branch ratified him as Consul General of Mexico in Los Angeles, where he currently serves.

He is the author of several publications about the relations between the governments of Mexico and the United States.

The Ambassador is married to Alina. They have two daughters: Marina and Camila.

Diplomatic posts
Preceded by Juan Hernández; 2000 to 2003	Executive Director; Institute for Mexicans Abroad; 2003 to 2009	Succeeded by Carlos Garcia de Alba; 2009 to 2011
Preceded by Alejandra Bologna	Consul General of Mexico in Sacramento; 2009 to 2015	Succeeded by Alejandra García Williams
Preceded by Rosalba Ojeda y Cárdenas	Consul General of Mexico in Austin; 2015 to 2019	Succeeded by Pablo Marentes González
Preceded by Marcela Celorio	Consul General of Mexico in San Diego; 2019 to current	Succeeded by
