= Unbanked =

Adults who do not have their own bank accounts

The unbanked are adults who do not have their own bank accounts. Along with the underbanked, they may rely on alternative financial services for their financial needs, where these are available.

== Causes ==
Some reasons a person might not have a bank account include:

- Lack of access via a nearby bank branch or mobile phone
- Minimum balance fees
- Distrust of the banking system, typically due to lack of transparency regarding fees and deposit timing
- No access to government-issued ID, which is required to open a bank account
- To avoid delinquent debts, such as creditors seizing the account in judgements, or the government collecting back taxes or child support

== In the United States ==
The unbanked are described by the Federal Deposit Insurance Corporation (FDIC) as those adults without an account at a bank or other financial institution and are considered to be outside the mainstream for one reason or another. In the FDIC's 2023 survey, 4.2 percent of U.S. households, representing 5.6 million households, were unbanked, while 14.2 percent, representing 19.0 million households, were underbanked.

In a 2025 working paper released by the Federal Reserve, Falcettoni and Nygaard argue for classifying individuals without a bank account according to their interest in having one. The new measure proposed in the paper would classify the unbanked as those that are not currently banked but are interested in having a bank account. By contrast, those who are not banked and not interested in being banked would make up the out of banking population. Using FDIC data, Falcettoni and Nygaard show that these two groups differ in policy-relevant ways. While the unbanked mostly cite financial and past credit or banking history problems as reasons for not having bank accounts, the out of banking population cites a growing mistrust toward the traditional banking system.

Data from 2009 showed the nationwide rates in the US to be 7.7% unbanked and 17.9% underbanked, with the most unbanked state Mississippi, at 16.4%. Places where over 20% of residents have no bank accounts include Miami, Florida, Detroit, Michigan, Laredo, Texas, Newark, New Jersey, Hialeah, Florida, Hidalgo County, Texas, The Bronx, and Cameron County, Texas. Many counties with fewer than 100,000 residents had even higher rates, including Starr County, Texas, at 32.7%. Some census tracts in Savannah, Georgia, Cleveland, Ohio, Nashville, Tennessee, and Atlanta, Georgia, had over 40% unbanked residents.

The majority of the unbanked and underbanked individuals are American-born, with a growing number being immigrants. Both groups share low income as a common characteristic and lack the minimum balance required to open checking and savings accounts. According to Representative Rubén Hinojosa, half of the unbanked had a bank account previously, but are choosing not to have an account, and opting to using the services of check cashers and payday lenders instead. Research has shown that immigrants who have experienced a banking crisis in their countries of origin are significantly less likely to have bank accounts in the U.S., and researchers also found that lower rates of financial market participation tend to persist even for immigrants who have lived in the U.S. for several years. Attributes that contribute to these decisions, however, vary for each racial/ethnic group.

Governor Arnold Schwarzenegger started the Bank on California initiative to help the unbanked in 2008. Previously, in 2001, a financial education curriculum called Money Smart was launched by the FDIC to help the financially unsavvy. Economist Lisa Servon comments that lack of financial education as a reason for using services other than banks is often an inaccurate stereotype.

Prior to becoming the FDIC chair in 2006, Sheila Bair ran a research project for the Inter-American Development Bank at the University of Massachusetts Amherst to discover ways to help unbanked Latin American immigrants use the U.S. banking system. She found that the primary reason recent Latino immigrants often do not use banks to remit money is because they are undocumented. Around the same time, the Treasury Department put in place Section 326 regulations that allow banks and credit unions to accept identification from foreign governments at their own discretion. Banks like Mitchell Bank in Milwaukee have taken up the Treasury Department on their relaxing of identification standards. They have even "offered pamphlets on how to apply for a Wisconsin state ID and driver's license, and invited the Mexican consulate in Chicago to visit with a mobile unit that issues 'matricula' cards". In Chicago, the Consul General of Mexico, Carlos Sada, estimated that up to 25% of applicants of the Matrícula Consular ID apply in order use it to acquire U.S. bank accounts.

=== Federal benefits for unbanked ===
A U.S. federal law signed in 1996 contained a provision that required the federal government to make electronic payments by 1999. As a part of implementation of the provision, in 2008 the U.S. Treasury Department paired with Comerica Bank to offer the Direct Express Debit MasterCard prepaid debit card. The card is used to make payments to federal benefit recipients who do not have a bank account.

=== Unbanked people per state ===
Percent of residents who are unbanked, in 2019, by US state
State	Percent
Alabama	7.6
Alaska	3.4
Arizona	4.0
Arkansas	7.1
California	5.6
Colorado	3.3
Connecticut	8.4
Delaware	2.8
Florida	3.8
Georgia	7.4
Hawaii	3.0
Idaho	4.0
Illinois	6.6
Indiana	4.5
Iowa	2.6
Kansas	5.5
Kentucky	6.5
Louisiana	11.4
Maine	2.3
Maryland	3.8
Massachusetts	3.7
Michigan	5.7
Minnesota	2.8
Mississippi	12.8
Missouri	6.2
Montana	4.0
Nebraska	6.5
Nevada	6.3
New Hampshire	0.5
New Jersey	4.0
New Mexico	8.7
New York	5.6
North Carolina	3.4
North Dakota	4.9
Ohio	4.6
Oklahoma	8.8
Oregon	3.8
Pennsylvania	4.0
Rhode Island	4.4
South Carolina	5.2
South Dakota	4.9
Tennessee	8.1
Texas	7.7
Utah	0.8
Vermont	0.7
Virginia	4.4
Washington	4.6
West Virginia	4.7
Wisconsin	2.9
Wyoming	3.6
United States overall	5.4

== International statistics ==
As of 2017, approximately 1.7 billion people remain unbanked in emerging economies.In development? Least advanced? Both? Please define. This number has decreased from 2.5 billion people in 2014.

== See also ==
- Banking desert
- Debanking
- Underbanked
