= Argentine consular identification card =

Consular identification card issued by the Government of Argentina

The Argentine consular identification card (Argentine CID Card; Spanish: Tarjeta de Identificación Consular Argentina, TICA), also known as Matrícula Consular (English: Consular Registration), is the consular identification card issued by the Government of Argentina through its consulate offices to Argentine nationals residing outside of Argentina. The term is also used by other Spanish-speaking countries, such as the Mexican Matrícula Consular.

According to the Argentine Consulate in Los Angeles, Argentine CID cards have a lot of benefits for Argentine citizens. Moreover, it can be used to board airplanes, gain access to banking, credits, libraries, municipal programs and funerals.
