= Sterling Bank (Texas) =

Former bank in Texas

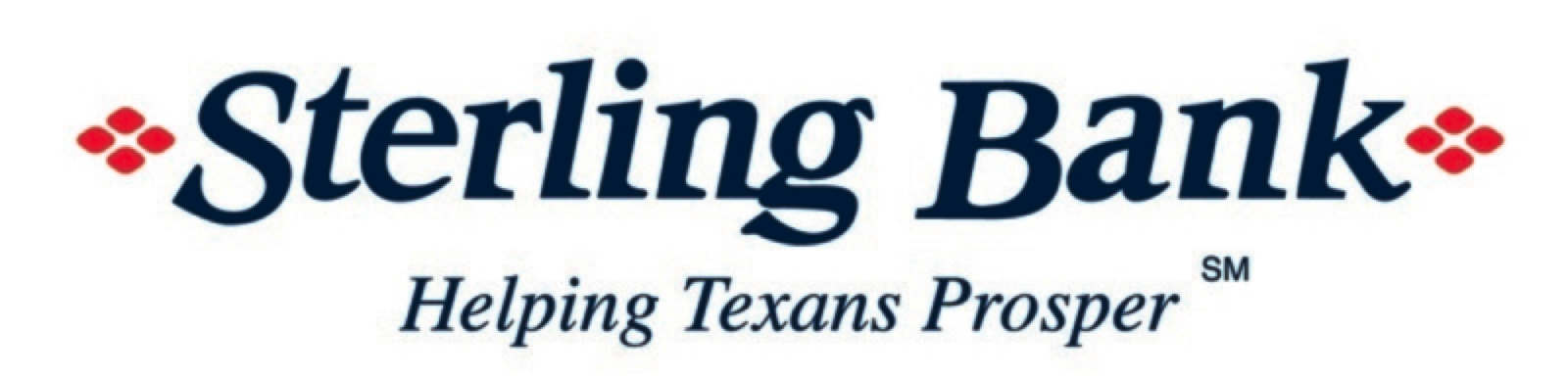

Sterling Bank was an owned subsidiary of Sterling Bankshares, Inc. (Nasdaq: SBIB), of Houston, Texas. Sterling has total assets of $5 billion and operates 56 banking centers in the greater metropolitan areas of Houston, San Antonio, Dallas, Fort Worth, as well as in the Texas Hill Country. The bank was founded in 1974 as Jersey Village Bank. Of the bank's 56 banking centers, 13 are in Dallas and Fort Worth, 29 are in Houston, 8 are in San Antonio, and 5 are in the Texas Hill Country.

On January 18, 2011 Sterling Bank announced that it would be acquired by Comerica Bank in a stock swap deal valuing Sterling Bank over $1 billion.

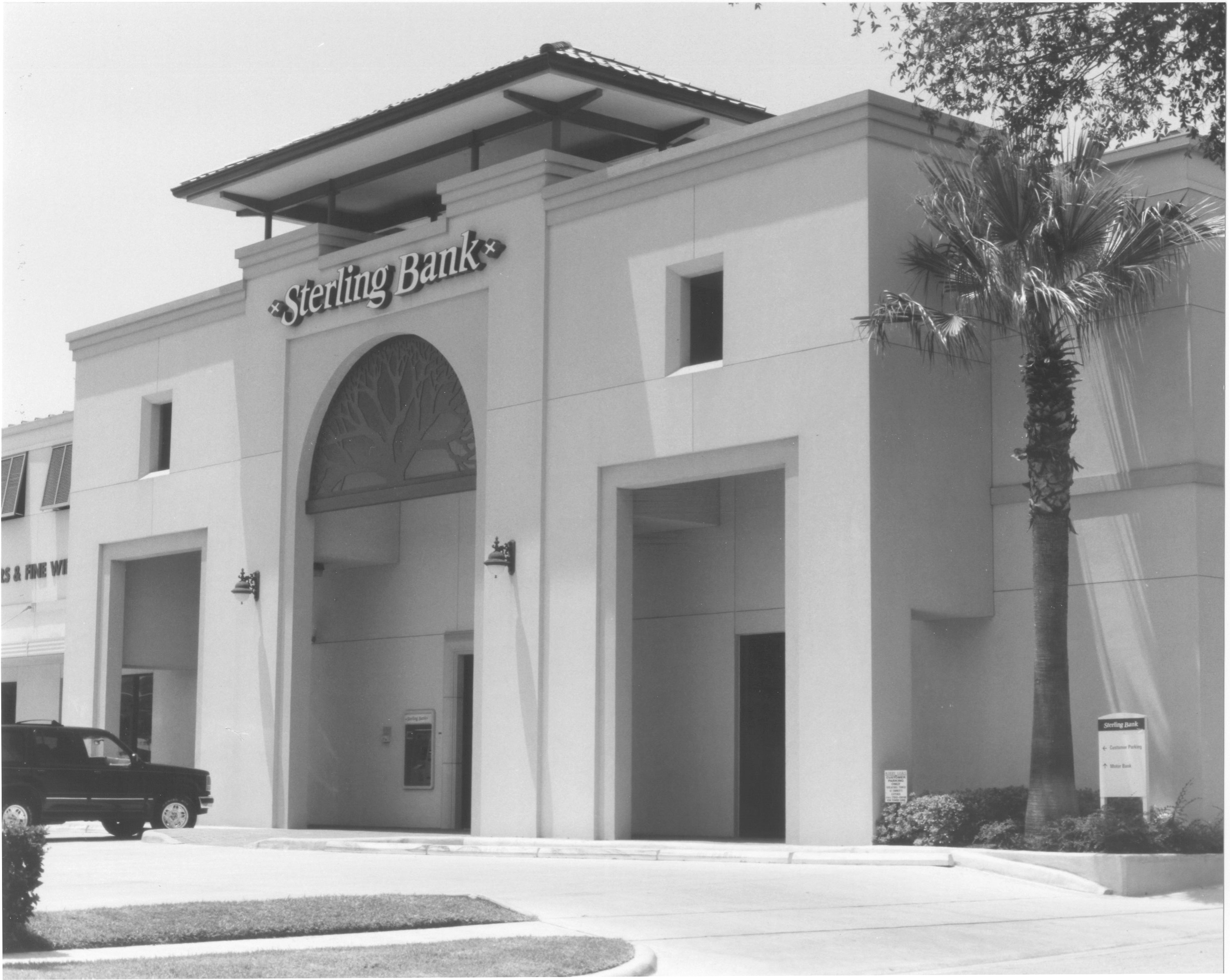

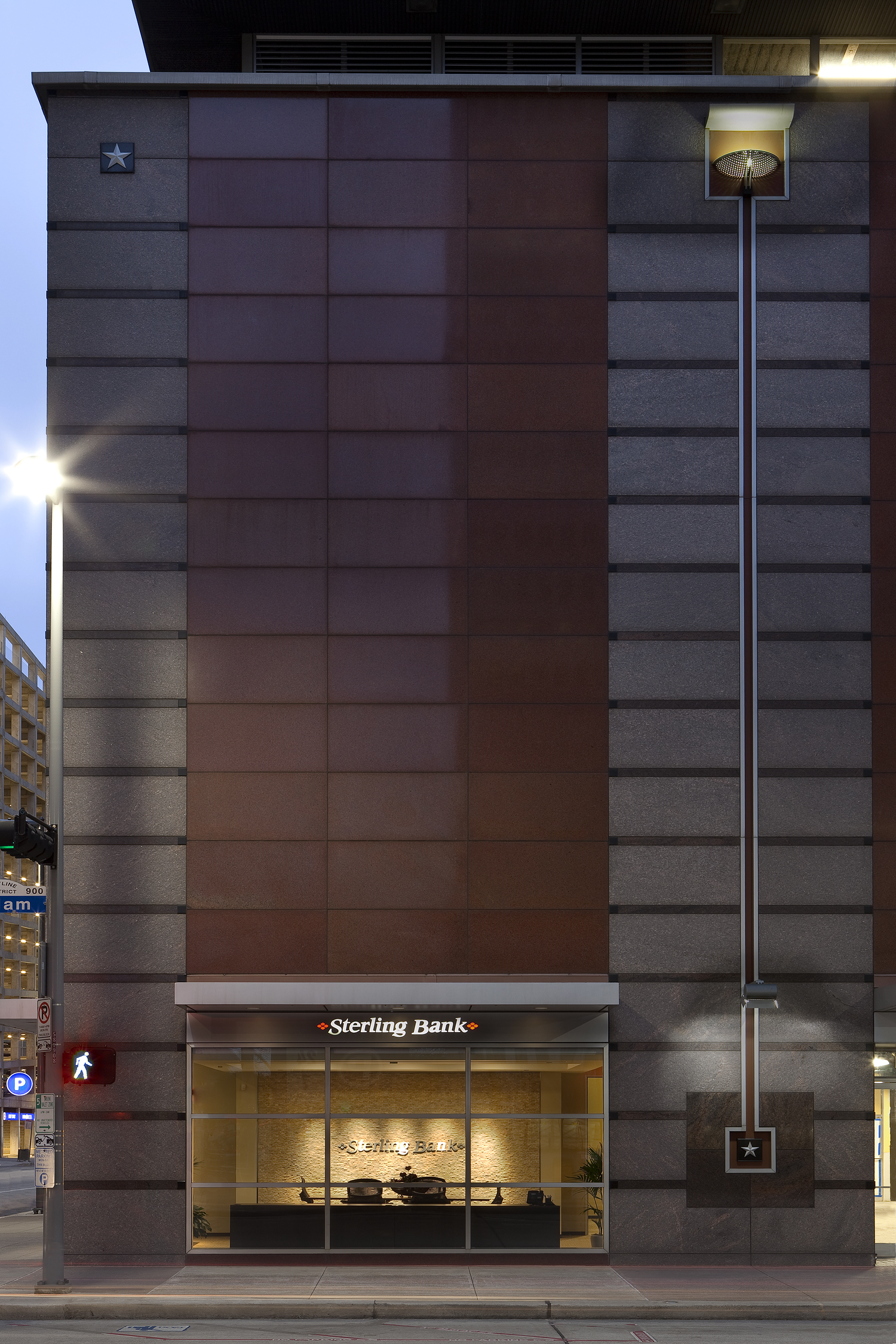

== Products and services ==
Sterling Bank offers business banking products and services including loans, lines of credit, multi-party checking, treasury management, automated clearinghouse functions, account analysis, investment sweep accounts, merchant credit card processing, international banking including letters of credit, export-import financing, investment portfolio management, trust and succession planning, interest bearing checking and IOLTA accounts, factoring, business online banking, Small Business Administration loans, and wire transfers.

Sterling also offers personal banking products, such as interest and noninterest bearing checking, savings, money market accounts, and certificates of deposit. Sterling Bank's personal services include online banking, telephone banking, private banking, and trust and investment management.

In 2009, Sterling Bank elected to participate in the expanded Federal Deposit Insurance Corporation (FDIC) program, which provides depositors with unlimited coverage for non-interest-bearing transaction accounts at participating FDIC-insured institutions through December 2012.

== Other branches and subsidiaries ==
Bank of the Hills is a branch of Sterling Bank that has five locations in the Texas Hill Country

MBM Advisors, Inc. is an operating subsidiary of Sterling Bank, and a full-service specialist in the design, administration, investment management, and communication of retirement plans.
