= The Virgin Islands Daily News =

Newspaper in Saint Thomas, United States Virgin Islands

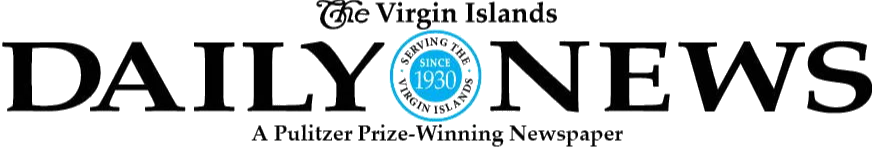

- Type: Daily newspaper
- Format: Tabloid
- Owner(s): Daily News Publishing Co.
- Founded: 1930
- Headquarters: 9155 Estate Thomas; St. Thomas, V.I. 00802
- Circulation: 17,000 Daily
- Website: virginislandsdailynews.com

The Virgin Islands Daily News is a daily newspaper in the United States Virgin Islands headquartered on the island of Saint Thomas. In 1995 the newspaper became one of the smallest ever to win journalism's most prestigious award, the Pulitzer Prize for Public Service. The newspaper is published every day except Sunday. The paper maintains its main office on Saint Thomas and a smaller bureau on Saint Croix.

== Business history ==
The Virgin Islands Daily News was founded by Ariel Melchior Sr. in 1930, with business partner J. Antonio Jarvis leveraging a tourist brochure financed with a bank loan cosigned by friend Adolph Achille Gereau. With the success of the brochure he was able to attract further advertising and convince his family and the bank to extend a larger loan. He first produced an updated guide to the island and with the proceeds bought a second-hand press. With the profits of the newspaper, he repaid the bank. Melchior was just 21 at the time. The paper was founded with the motto "More and Better Business for St. Thomas." In 1940, Melchior bought out Jarvis's share of the company.

In 1978, after serving as publisher for nearly 48 years, Melchior sold the newspaper to the Gannett Company for $3.5 million. Melchior is credited with instilling the newspapers aggressive journalism. After the sale, Melchior remained involved with the paper. Under Gannett, the paper won a Pulitzer Prize, and in 1997 Jeffrey L. Prosser, a businessman of whom the newspaper had been critical offered Gannett $17 million for the paper.

On July 31, 2006 Prosser's company Innovative Communications Corp. declared bankruptcy after defaulting on loans. In February 2007, a trustee was appointed to manage the assets, including the Virgin Island Daily News. Times-Shamrock Communications bought the paper in 2008.

In October 2014, Times-Shamrock announced it was selling the paper to Virgin Islands businessman Archie Nahigian.

== Journalism awards ==
In 1994, the paper had a circulation of 16,400 and a staff of 18 full-time editors and reporters. In June 1994 the newspaper began to inquire about why there had been little investigation into the death of a policeman known for his integrity. The reports resulted in a 10-part series "Virgin Island Crime: Who's to Blame?" The series determined that the police were catching too few criminals, that prosecutors were losing too many cases, and that judges were handing out light sentences. The sole reporter of the series, Melvin Claxton, received such severe threats that he relocated his family to the U.S. mainland.

The series created a stir on the islands. After the articles ran, a new police commissioner and attorney general were appointed for the U.S. Virgin Islands, and a top narcotics official quit.

In 1995, the series was awarded the Pulitzer Prize for Public Service. The Pulitzer Committee made the citation: "Awarded to The Virgin Islands Daily News, St. Thomas, for its disclosure of the links between the region's rampant crime rate and corruption in the local criminal justice system. The reporting, largely the work of Melvin Claxton, initiated political reforms."

The Virgin Islands Daily News, with limited resources, beat out the much larger Charlotte Observer and the Philadelphia Inquirer to claim the prize. The Virgin Islands Daily News is the third-smallest newspaper to ever win the Pulitzer Prize for Public Service, the smallest being the Point Reyes Light in Marin County, California.

The paper has continued to pursue award-winning journalism. In 2003, The Society of Professional Journalists awarded the Virgin Islands Daily News with its public service award for small circulation newspapers for an investigation into the use of deadly force by Virgin Islands police. In 2007 the paper won the Associated Press Managing Editors Award for Public Service in the small circulation category for its investigation into incompetence and corruption in the police department's major crimes unit. It also won the Capitolbeat in-depth reporting award in 2007, for a special section about outgoing Gov. Charles Turnbull.

In 2015, The Virgin Islands Daily News nominated the government of the Virgin Islands for the 'Black Hole Award' given by The Society of Professional Journalists. SPJ launched the Black Hole Award "to highlight the most heinous violations of the public's right to know". It awarded its fifth annual Black Hole Award to the V.I. government for "its bald and breathtaking contempt of the public's right to know".

In 2016, the paper again won the public service award (newspapers under 50,000 circulation) from The Society of Professional Journalists for its extensive and ongoing coverage of the U.S. Virgin Islands government.

In 2022, the paper won the second place Sunshine State Award in Editorial Writing from the Florida chapter of the Society of Professional Journalists. Daily News Executive Editor Eunice Bedminster received the award for three editorials published in the "Extra!" Opinions section.
