= Guatemalan consular identification card =

Consular identification card issued by the Government of Guatemala

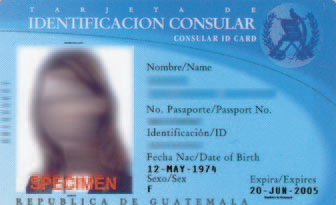
Sample Guatemalan CID card (front side) - issued in the United States beginning in August 2002

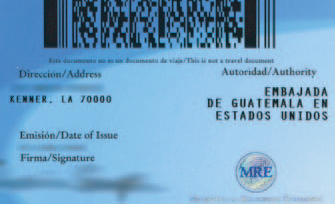
Sample Guatemalan CID card (back side) - issued in the United States beginning in August 2002

The Guatemalan consular identification card (Spanish: Tarjeta de Identificación Consular Guatemalteca, TICG) is the identification card issued by the Government of Guatemala through its consulate offices abroad to Guatemalan nationals residing outside of Guatemala.

The consular offices of Guatemala began issuing this consular identification card in the United States in August 2002, after the Mexican government's foreign consular agents in the United States began lobbying states, municipalities and financial institutions in the United States to accept the Mexican consular identification card in March 2002.

Unlike Mexico's CID card application process, Guatemala requires a valid Guatemalan passport which is checked against Guatemala's central passport database system. Guatemala's passport requires two fingerprints and a photograph and signature.

The Bank on California program launched by California Governor Arnold Schwarzenegger in December 2008 encouraged financial institutions to accept the Mexican CID, Guatemalan CID, and other countries' consular identification cards as the primary identification for opening bank accounts.

== See also ==
- Guatemalan passport
