= Leonardo Ffrench =

Mexican diplomat (??–2024)

Leonardo Ffrench Iduarte died May 1st, 2024 in Cuernavaca, Morelos. He was a retired career Mexican Ambassador who served in variety of posts. He was the Foreign Press spokesperson for President Carlos Salinas and the first full-time spokesman at the Mexican Embassy in the US. He was also Consul General of Mexico in Denver. Subsequently he was promoted to the Consulate in Chicago. He was the Director General of IME the Institute for Mexicans Abroad during the last three years of the Ernesto Zedillo administration. After he retired he was a political and social commentator in the press and TV and consultant living in Cuernavaca, Morelos, Mexico. Ambassador Ffrench had been among Mexico's diplomatic corps retirees most active in lobbying for cost of living pension adjustments.

Diplomatic posts
Preceded by	Executive Director Ambassador; Institute for Mexicans Abroad; 1997 to 2000	Succeeded by Juan Hernandez; 2000 to 2006
