= Consular identification card =

Identification cards issued to citizens living abroad

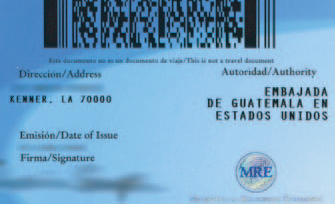
Specimen of the Guatemalan CID card (back side)

The consular identification cards (also referred to as CID card) is issued by some countries' governments to their citizens who are living in foreign countries. The card may be used, for example, by an embassy to allow its citizens to vote in a foreign country. Some foreign jurisdictions accept them for some identification purposes. They are not certifications of legal residence within foreign countries, so CID card holders could be legal or illegal aliens.

== Use in the United States ==
Use of consular identification cards is controversial within the United States, as one aspect of the controversies over illegal immigration.

Issuing travel documents and passports are some of the functions performed by consular offices for their citizens. "According to the Department of State, issuance of CID cards falls within the general scope of permissible consular functions." The Vienna Convention on Consular Relations of 1963 defined the allowable activities for consulate offices such as registering its citizens within foreign countries.

Some jurisdictions and businesses accept them for some identification purposes.

In late 2001, the newly created 9/11 Commission recommended the United States establish standards for sources of identification, however the documents required to acquire CID cards vary from country to country, as noted below in the chart.

In November 2004, the U.S. Congress restored funding for the Treasury Department to implement regulations that allow financial institutions to accept CID cards for banking (H.R. 4818/P.L. 108-447).

A 2004 report prepared for the United States Congress by the Congressional Research Service (CRS) acknowledges controversy over the use of CID cards. It states that supporters of consular identification cards argue that they are important to improve security and bring transactions out into the open where they can be monitored more as well as improve bilateral relations by notifying consulates when foreign nationals are detained. Others say that acceptance of CID by US institutions is inappropriate since it facilitates the unlawful stay within the United States of undocumented aliens. and that cards are only needed "by aliens who are illegally present in the United States and serve to undermine U.S. immigration policy". They say that at best better regulation is needed of these cards to "reinforce immigration policy and to defend against terrorism." Foreign governments are accused of "issuing consular identification cards in the United States for purposes other than those intended by the Vienna Convention on Consular Relations, namely to circumvent U.S. immigration law, and that the issuance of the cards should be subject to U.S. regulation."

In 2005, the REAL ID Act became law which requires that applicants for state-issued identity cards and driving licences are "lawfully present in the United States" and that "an official passport is the only acceptable foreign identity document."

The Argentinian Consulate in Los Angeles advertises the benefits of their CID cards in the United States for Argentine citizens as a means to avoid deportation, board aircraft, and obtain access to banking, credit, libraries, municipal programs and funerals.

The United States government does not issue CID cards. It has recently begun issuing the U.S. Passport Card to U.S. citizens for land and sea travel to and from Canada, Mexico, the Caribbean, and Bermuda as well as for domestic air travel within America but not for international air travel.

== History ==
Countries with Consular Identification (CID) Cards
Country	Card Name	Cost	Since	Ref.
Argentina	Matrícula Consular	Free; Certificate costs $10		
Bolivia				
Brazil	Matrícula Consular	Free		
Colombia	cédula de ciudadanía (citizen ID)	Free	1853	
Dominican Republic	localizador archivo	$12		
Ecuador	consular ID	$5		
France	Registre des Français établis hors de France	Free		
Guatemala	Tarjeta de Identificación Consular Guatemalteca (TICG)	$30	August 2002	
Guinea	consular ID	$25		
Honduras	Tarjeta de Matrícula Consular			
Mali	carte d'identité consulaire	$18		
Mexico	Matrícula Consular de Alta Seguridad (MCAS)	US$27	1871	
Nigeria	citizen's certificate	$25		
Pakistan	national identity card for overseas Pakistanis (NICOP)	$15		
Peru	tarjeta consular	$2		
Senegal	consular ID	$4		
Tunisia	بطاقة ترسيم	$7		
