= Comerica =

American financial services company

Comerica Incorporated

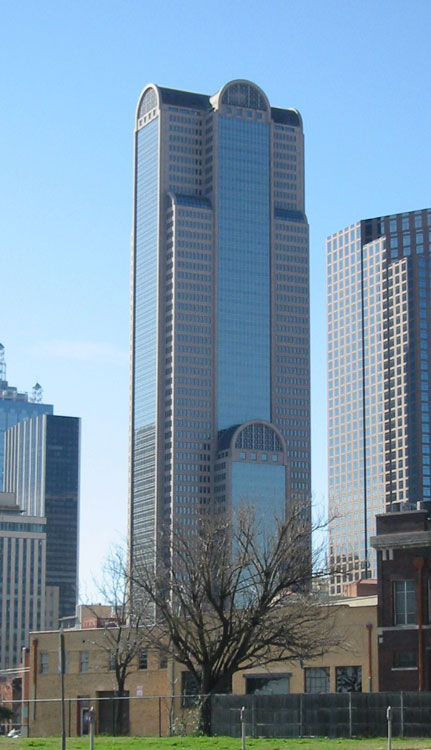
- Comerica Bank Tower in Downtown Dallas, Texas
- Formerly: Bank: Detroit Savings Fund Institute (1849–1871); The Detroit Savings Bank (1871–1936); The Detroit Bank (1936–1956); The Detroit Bank and Trust Company (1956–1982); Holding Company: DetroitBank Corporation (1973–1982)
- Type: Subsidiary
- Traded as: NYSE: CMA
- Industry: Financial services
- Founded: August 17, 1849; 177 years ago (as Detroit Savings Fund Institute)
- Founder: Elon Farnsworth
- Defunct: February 1, 2026; 8 months ago (as an independent corporation); September 8, 2026; 28 days ago (as a brand)
- Fate: Acquired by Fifth Third Bank
- Successor: Fifth Third Bank
- Headquarters: Detroit, Michigan (1849–2007); Comerica Bank Tower; Dallas, Texas (2007–2026)
- Number of locations: 360 branches (2026)
- Key people: Curt Farmer (chairman, president & CEO); James J. Herzog (CFO)
- Services: Commercial banking; Retail banking; Wealth management
- Revenue: ▼US$4.99 billion (2024)
- Net income: ▼US$698 million (2024)
- Total assets: ▼US$79.3 billion (2024)
- Total equity: ▲US$6.54 billion (2024)
- Number of employees: 7,565 (2024)
- Website: comerica.com (archived September 2026)

Comerica Incorporated was an American financial services company, headquartered in Dallas, Texas. It was the parent of Comerica Bank, a regional commercial bank with 413 branches in the U.S. states of Texas, Michigan, California, Florida and Arizona. Comerica was among the largest U.S. financial holding companies, before being acquired by Fifth Third Bank in 2026.

== History ==
=== 19th century ===
At the start of 1849, there were just three banks in Detroit: Farmers & Mechanics' Bank, Michigan Insurance Company Bank, and the State Bank of Michigan. These three banks were commercial banks that served the business community. On August 17, 1849, Comerica was founded in Detroit by Elon Farnsworth, a lawyer and politician, as the Detroit Savings Fund Institute. Michigan Governor Epaphroditus Ransom signed an act authorizing the formation of the institute. Ransom also appointed 11 men of high repute to serve as unpaid trustees. The institute's first location was an office that was adjacent and owned by Mariners’ Church.

An ad published in 1852-53 issue of Detroit's directory expressed the institute's purpose at the time:

The design of the Institution is to afford to those who are desirous of saving money, but who have not acquired sufficient to purchase a share in the banks, railroads, or a sum in public stocks, the means of employing their money to advantage ...

Unlike most banks of that time, the Institute paid interest on deposits, had no shareholders or capital stock, and was managed by unpaid fiduciaries. Courting customers from the working class, merchants and even children, the Institute enjoyed steady growth, reaching the $1 million mark in 1870.

In 1871, the state of Michigan passed a new law meant to encourage the formation of banks that offered both savings and commercial services. In response, the Institute transformed from a trust to a stockholder-owned corporation. Its name changed to The Detroit Savings Bank in 1871.

=== 20th century ===
In 1901, Detroit Savings Bank had 10,000 customers. By 1905, the bank had a staff of 21 employees, who managed a downtown main office and two branches.

As the banking situation in the nation became especially volatile in the 1930s, Detroit Savings Bank attempted to continue offering services. On multiple occasions in 1933, Detroit Savings Bank was the sole bank offering full personal and commercial services in Detroit. The Detroit Savings Bank changed its name to The Detroit Bank in 1936, being one of the few area banks to survive the Great Depression.

In 1956, the company merged with Birmingham National Bank, Ferndale National Bank and Detroit Wabeek Bank and Trust Company to form The Detroit Bank & Trust Company. As the bank's growth continued, so did its presence, opening its first foreign office in London in 1969. The early 1970s introduced new technological advancements to banking, which Detroit Bank & Trust would adopt. These advancements include Master Charge cards and automated teller machines (ATM) such as the Ultra/Matic 24. In 1973, it formed a holding company, DetroitBank Corporation. A year later, the Bank & Trust would celebrate its 125th anniversary. The current name, Comerica (a combination of "Commercial" and "America"), was adopted in 1982.

In 1982, Comerica entered the Florida market. In 1983, it began the acquisition process for its hometown rival, Bank of the Commonwealth of Michigan. In the same year, Comerica entered California and Texas markets by offering auto financing services. It 1984, it completed the merger with the Bank of Commonwealth of Detroit. It strengthened its entrance into the Texas market in 1988 when it acquired Grand Bancshares. This was the first of 21 Texas acquisitions.

In 1990, Comerica received approval to construct a new headquarters building, Comerica Tower at Detroit Center (alternatively known as One Detroit Center).

In 1991, the bank expanded to California by acquiring Plaza Commerce Bancorp and InBancshares.

In 1992, the bank merged with a similarly sized Detroit-based bank, Manufacturers National Corporation. The merger of Comerica and Manufacturers created one of the country's 25 largest bank holding companies.

In 1996, the bank sold its Illinois operation to LaSalle Bank parent ABN Amro for $190 million.

In 1998, the bank signed a 30-year $66 million agreement for the naming rights to Comerica Park in downtown Detroit, home to the Detroit Tigers of Major League Baseball. A year later, Comerica would celebrate its 150th anniversary.

=== 21st century ===
Former logo, used from 1992 until 2022

In 2000, Comerica sold its credit card division to MBNA and formed an alliance with the company.

In 2001, the bank acquired Imperial Bank of California, which also had branches in Arizona.

In late 2004, the bank began a plan to diversify its operations by opening new banking centers in strong growth markets, primarily in Texas and California. Comerica opened 18 new banking centers in 2005, 25 new banking centers in 2006, and 30 banking centers in 2007.

On March 6, 2007, the company announced its decision to relocate its corporate headquarters to Dallas to move closer to its customer base in the Sun Belt. In August, the company announced that it selected 1717 Main Street in Downtown Dallas. The company executives began moving into the new location in November 2007 and the building was renamed Comerica Tower.

In January 2008, the United States Department of the Treasury selected the company as the issuing bank for its Direct Express debit card program. The federal government uses the Express Debit product to issue electronic payments, such as Social Security benefits, to people who do not have bank accounts.

In July 2011, the bank acquired Sterling Bank of Texas for $1.03 billion. The acquisition virtually tripled Comerica's market share in Houston and provided entry into the San Antonio and Kerrville regions.

Comerica branch in Peoria, Arizona

In 2017, the bank announced plans to reduce its office space by 500,000 square feet, saving $7 million in 2018.

Comerica celebrated a historic milestone in 2019, marking its 170th anniversary.

In May 2021, the bank announced that it would provide $5 billion in small business loans from 2021 to 2023.

Comerica expanded into North Carolina with the creation of its new Southeast Market in August 2021. With market headquarters in Raleigh, along with offices in Winston-Salem and Charlotte, the Southeast Market supports Wealth and Commercial Bank customers based in North Carolina, Florida, Georgia, South Carolina, Tennessee and Virginia.

On May 29, 2023, American Banker reported that i2c Inc., a Comerica contractor, conducted Direct Express operations through an office in Pakistan, in violation of the bank's contract with the Treasury, which requires all program operations to be conducted in the United States. The report caused Comerica's stock price to fall.

=== Acquisition by Fifth Third Bank ===
On October 6, 2025, Fifth Third Bank announced a definitive agreement to acquire Comerica for $10.9 billion. Per reports at the time, the all-stock transaction was expected to create the ninth-largest bank in the U.S., with existing Fifth Third shareholders holding roughly 73% of shares in the merged company, and existing Comerica shareholders 27%.

In December 2025, Crain's Detroit Business reported that 50 Comerica branches, primarily in Michigan, were expected to close in 2026 once the acquisition was completed. Comerica began to lay off Michigan employees in January 2026 in preparation for the merger. In May 2026, Fifth Third announced that more than 500 employees at Comerica's office in Farmington Hills, Michigan would be laid off.

The merger closed on February 1, 2026, creating the ninth-largest bank in the U.S., with about $294 billion in assets. Following the merger, Comerica initially continued to operate as a separate division of Fifth Third. Fifth Third completed the process of integrating Comerica's operations and accounts, and rebranded remaining Comerica branches, on September 8, 2026.

== Sponsorships ==
Comerica owned the naming rights to Comerica Park in Detroit, Michigan, home of the Detroit Tigers of Major League Baseball, from its opening in 2000 until 2026. Comerica also owned the naming rights to the Arizona Financial Theatre in Phoenix, from 2010 until 2019; and the Comerica Center in Frisco, Texas, from 2019 until 2026. Comerica was also the exclusive presenting sponsor of the Fox Theatre in Detroit from 2022 until 2026.
