= Voter Credential =

Mexican identity document

Voter Credential (Credencial para Votar)
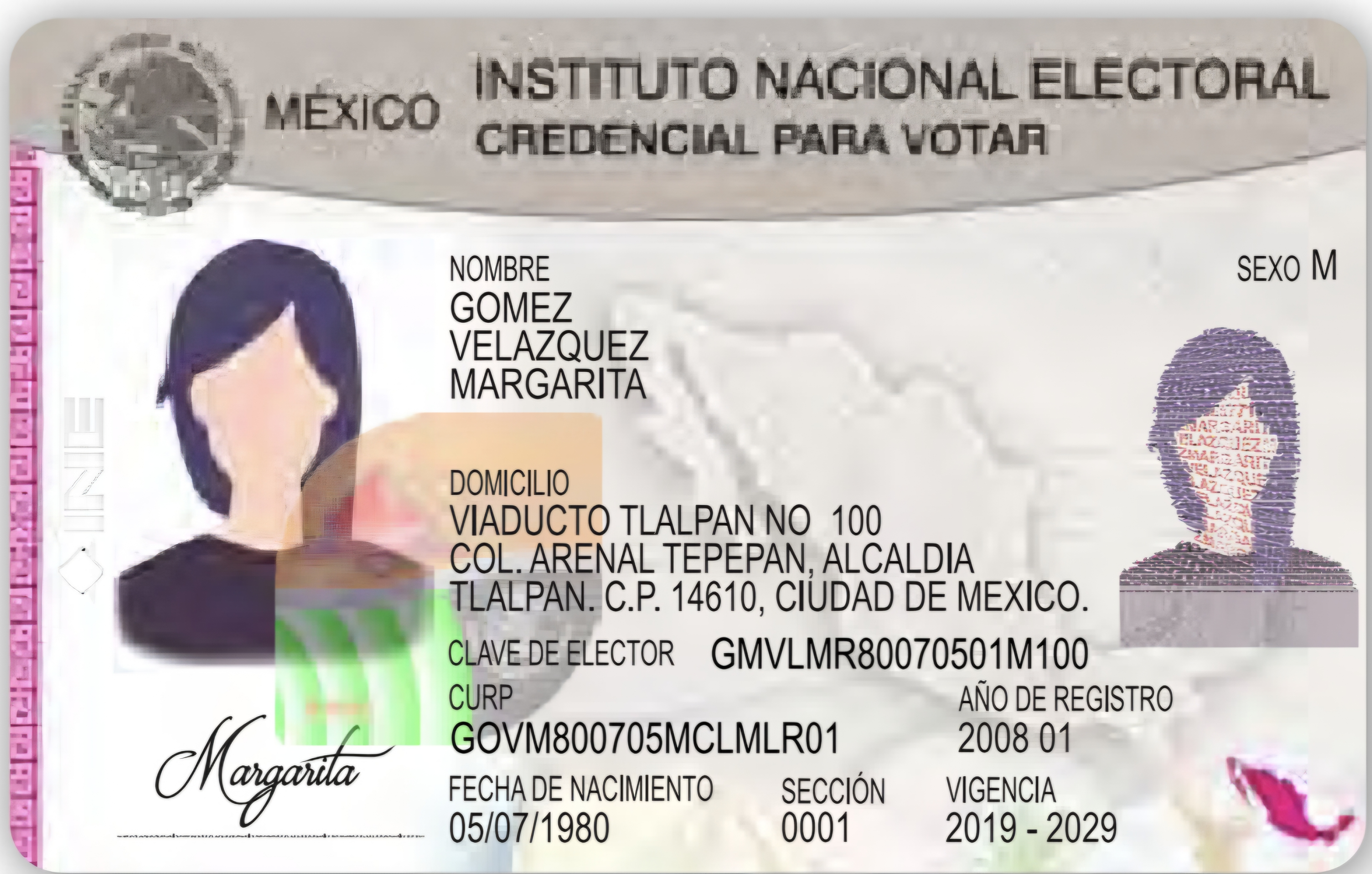
- Model of the Voter Credential (obverse)

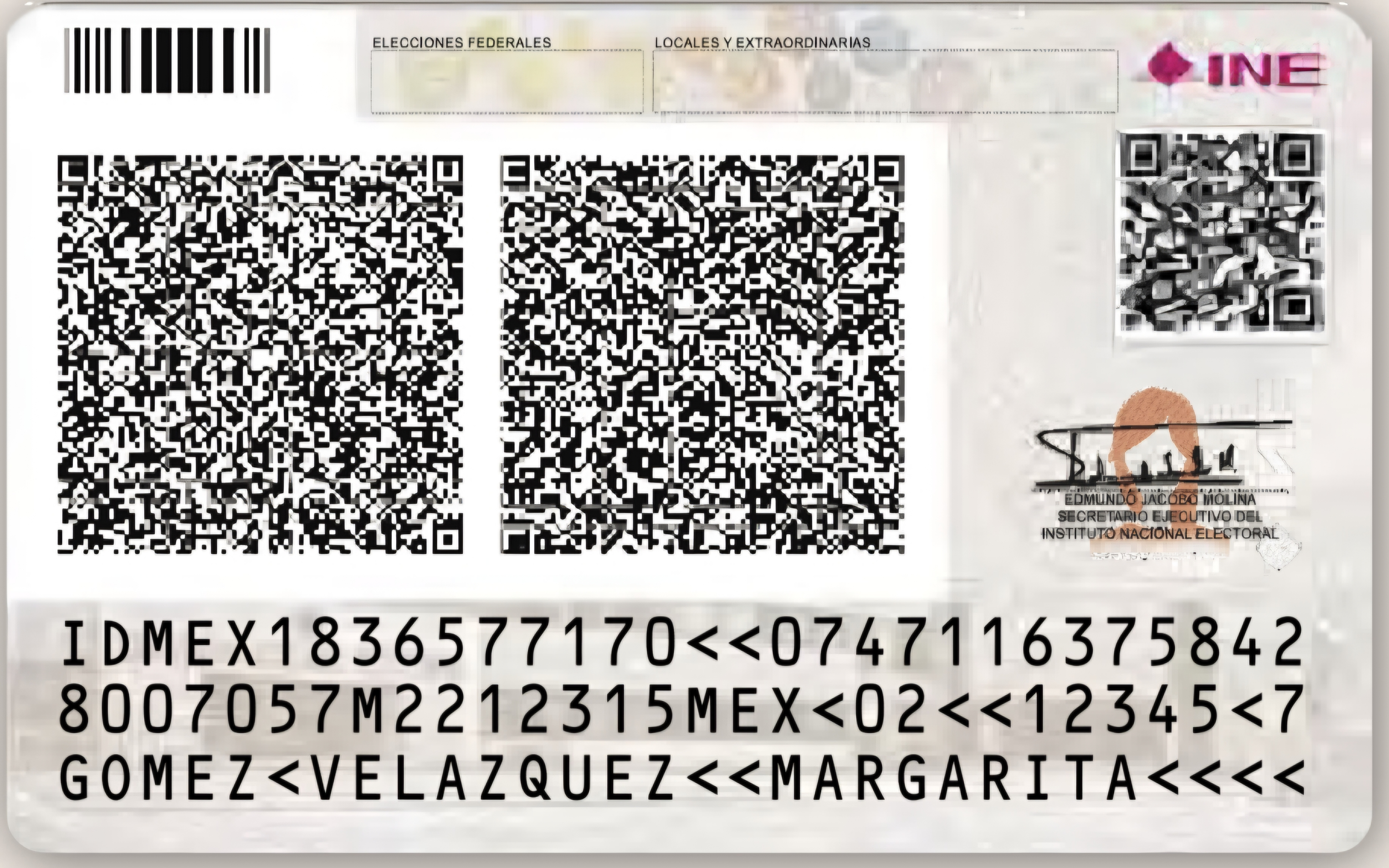
- Model of the Voter Credential (reverse)
- Type: Identity card
- Issued by: National Electoral Institute
- First issued: 1991
- Purpose: Voting, identification, domestic travel
- Valid in: Mexico
- Eligibility: Mexican citizenship
- Expiration: Every 10 years from its issuance
- Cost: Free

The Voter Credential (Spanish: Credencial para Votar), also known as Elector Credential (Spanish: Credencial de Elector), INE Card (Spanish: Tarjeta INE; formerly IFE Card, Spanish: Tarjeta IFE), and Mexican Voter ID Card (Spanish: Tarjeta de Identificación de Votación Mexicana), is an official document issued by the National Electoral Institute (INE) that allows Mexican citizens of legal age to participate in local and federal elections in Mexico, in addition to being the most accepted document as official identification for all civil, administrative, commercial, labor, judicial and, in general, all acts in which, by law, the person must identify themselves. Mexican citizens living in a foreign country are issued the Voter Credential from Abroad (Spanish: Credencial para Votar desde el Extranjero) through an embassy or consulate of Mexico. It is considered the Mexican National Identity Card (Spanish: Cédula de Identidad Nacional Mexicana).

== Procedure ==
The voter credential is processed by Mexicans over 18 years of age who have Mexican Nationality either by birth or by naturalization. Once the terms established by law have been met, the procedure is carried out at the INE module closest to the interested party's domicile by presenting one of the following documents:

=== Documents to request the Credential ===
- Nationality document
  - Birth certificate.
  - Naturalization letter.
- Photo identification
  - Mexican passport.
  - Professional license.
  - Driver's license.
  - National Military Service Card.
  - Public service credential.
  - Documents from public or private schools.
  - Credentials of beneficiaries.
  - Work identification credentials.
- Proof of address

== Information displayed on the voter credential ==
The voter credential contains the following information:

- Full name
- Sex
- Address (Currently, the appearance of the address on the front is at the discretion of the applicant: If you receive a YES, the person who attends the window will add your address on the front of the plastic. If you receive a NO, the impression will be made without the address, for the greater convenience of the person requesting)
- CURP (Unique Population Registry Code)
- Elector key
- Registration year
- Birthdate
- Electoral section
- Validity
- Photography
- Signature

The voter credential from abroad issued to Mexican citizens living in the United States contains the information in Spanish and English.

== Security elements ==
=== Obverse ===
On the front, the credential has the following security elements:

UV Ink

The colors of ultraviolet inks are perceptible with black light, it contains printed fixed data (INE, MEXICO), images and variable data of the citizen.

Weakened Pattern

The design of the security background is integrated with the border of the photograph, giving the appearance of merging this image with the rest of the credential design.

"Guilloche" Designs

All credentials have a pattern of figures formed with fine lines that are generally difficult to imitate with printers or photocopiers; if you try, you get points and not lines.

Microtext

They contain the legend: NATIONAL ELECTORAL INSTITUTE, which is not legible with the naked eye.

Rainbow Print

They have line patterns printed with two or more simultaneous colors of ink that form representative images of each region of the country with a rainbow effect.

Touch Element

When you touch it with your fingertips, you can see the initials of the INE and the ballot entering the ballot box.

Ghost Photography with Variable Data

Ghost photography is strengthened as a security element by applying software that creates the image from citizen data with a variable pattern, which makes it unique and difficult to reproduce.

OVI Ink

Specialized printing ink that changes color depending on the angle of light at which it is observed. On the Voter Credential you can see the change in color of the map of the Mexican Republic that is in the lower right, as well as the left strip that is located next to the citizen's photograph.

Embossed Design

All badges have lines with special designs that simulate an embossed effect. This effect is very difficult to reproduce with a scanner or digital photographs. On the back of the credentials you can see an image formed with the names of all the entities in the country.

Optically Variable Element (OVD)

The device changes color, depending on the angle of light at which it is observed, the images that are seen are. the INE logo, the ballot box, the coat of arms of Mexico and a flag effect.

=== Reverse ===
On the back, the credential has the following security elements:

UV Ink

On the back, all credentials have the citizen's photograph printed with ink that reacts to ultraviolet light or black light.

Microtext

In the outline where the boxes are located to mark the vote, there is a microtext that is not readable with the naked eye. embossed design Voter Credential

Embossed Design

All credentials have lines with special designs that simulate a relief effect that is difficult to reproduce with a scanner or digital photographs. On the credentials you can see an image with the names of the country's entities.

Rainbow Print

They have printed line patterns with two or more simultaneous colors of ink that simulate the effect of a rainbow.

QR Code

This element can be scanned by a smart phone and directs you to a page of services offered by the INE for citizens, where you can access to schedule an appointment, locate the module that corresponds to you, and verify the validity of your Credential.

Two-Dimensional QR Codes

These elements can be scanned by an exclusive INE application that is more agile and easier to optimize the verification of the Voter Credential. In addition, the way in which the data is generated in the QR codes allows us to guarantee that they were issued by the INE, preventing the use of false or altered Credentials.

OVI Ink

The credentials are printed with a special ink that generates a change in color variably depending on the angle of observation or lighting. This effect can be seen on the credential in the INE logo located in the upper right.

== History ==
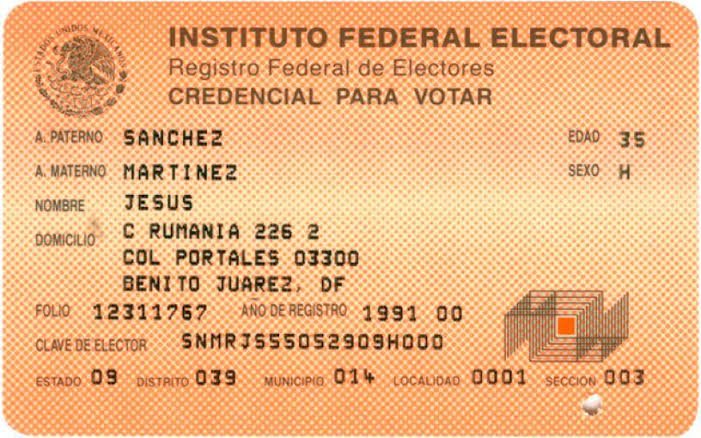
An Orange Credential from 1992

After the creation of the Federal Electoral Institute (IFE) in 1990, the creation of an identification was promoted for Mexicans to exercise their electoral political rights. The first voter credential was called the Orange Credential (Spanish: Credencial Naranja) in reference to its color.

=== First voter credential with photo ===
In 1992 the IFE created the first voter credential with a photograph; This implemented as another security measure to avoid misuse such as identity theft.

=== 2014 IFE-INE Reform ===
After the electoral political reform of the Federal Electoral Institute (IFE) to the National Electoral Institute (INE) in 2014, the credential did not undergo so many changes since only the logo and the name of the institution were updated.

=== 2020 Voter Credential ===
After the voter credential was falsified and sold to migrants from Honduras and Guatemala, the INE updated the data on the voter credentials, registered the citizens' data in QR codes and created an application for verification against the electoral roll.

== See also ==
- Identity document
- Unique Population Registry Code (CURP)
- Federal Taxpayer Registry (RFC)
- Driving licence in Mexico
- Matrícula Consular
- Mexican passport
- Mexican nationality law
