= Servicio de Administración Tributaria =

Revenue service of the Mexican federal government

Tax Administration Service Servicio de Administración Tributaria
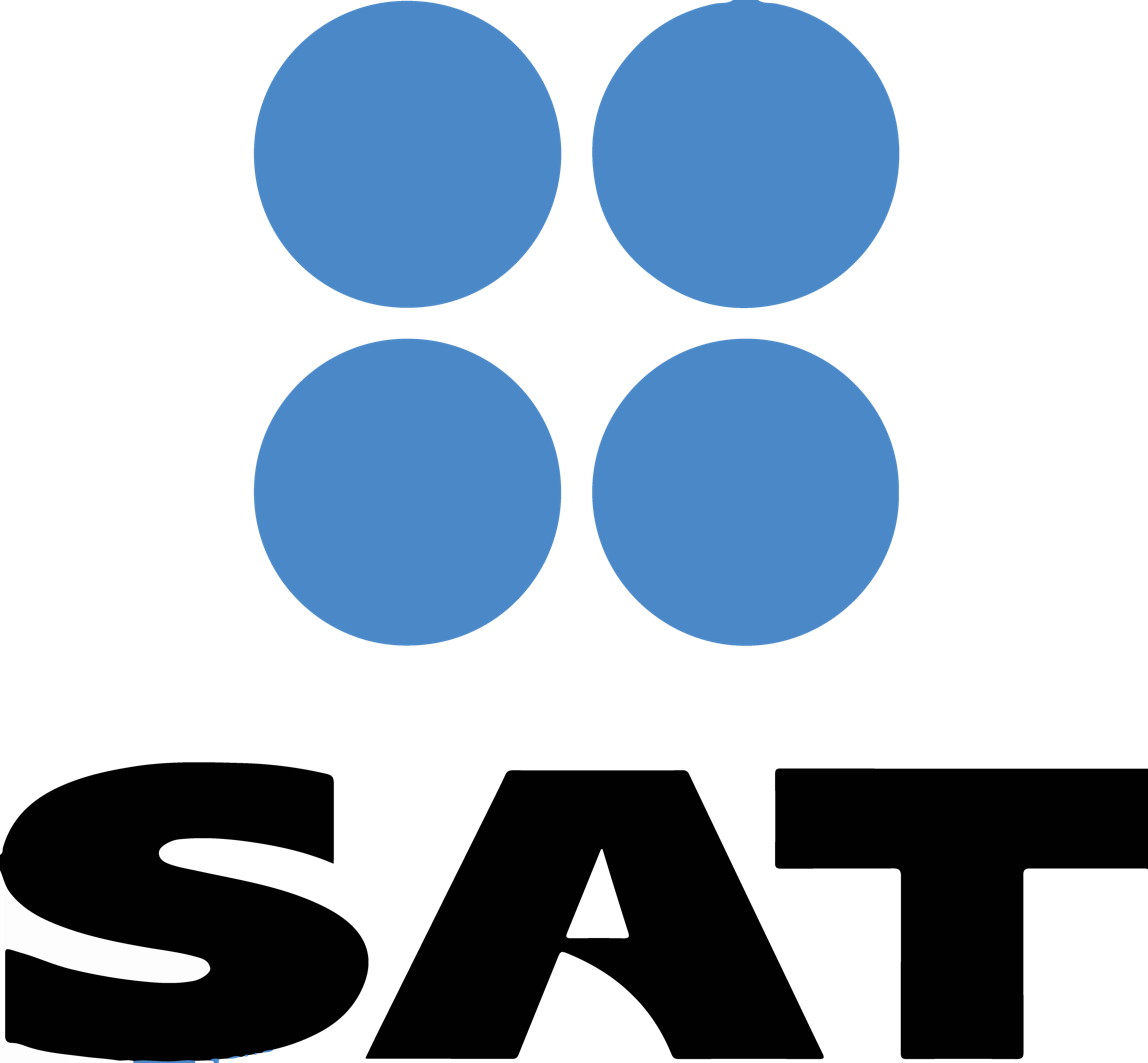
- Logo of Servicio de Administración Tributaria

Agency overview
- Formed: December 15, 1995; 30 years ago
- Preceding agency: Undersecretariat of Income (Subsecretaría de Ingresos)
- Annual budget: Mex$13,790,000,000 (2016)

Jurisdictional structure
- Operations jurisdiction: Mexico
- Constituting instrument: Law of the Tax Administration Service, 1995
- Specialist jurisdictions: Customs, excise, gambling; Taxation

Operational structure
- Agency executive: Osvaldo Santín Quiroz, Chief of the SAT (Jefe del SAT)
- Parent agency: Secretariat of Finance and Public Credit

Website
- www.sat.gob.mx

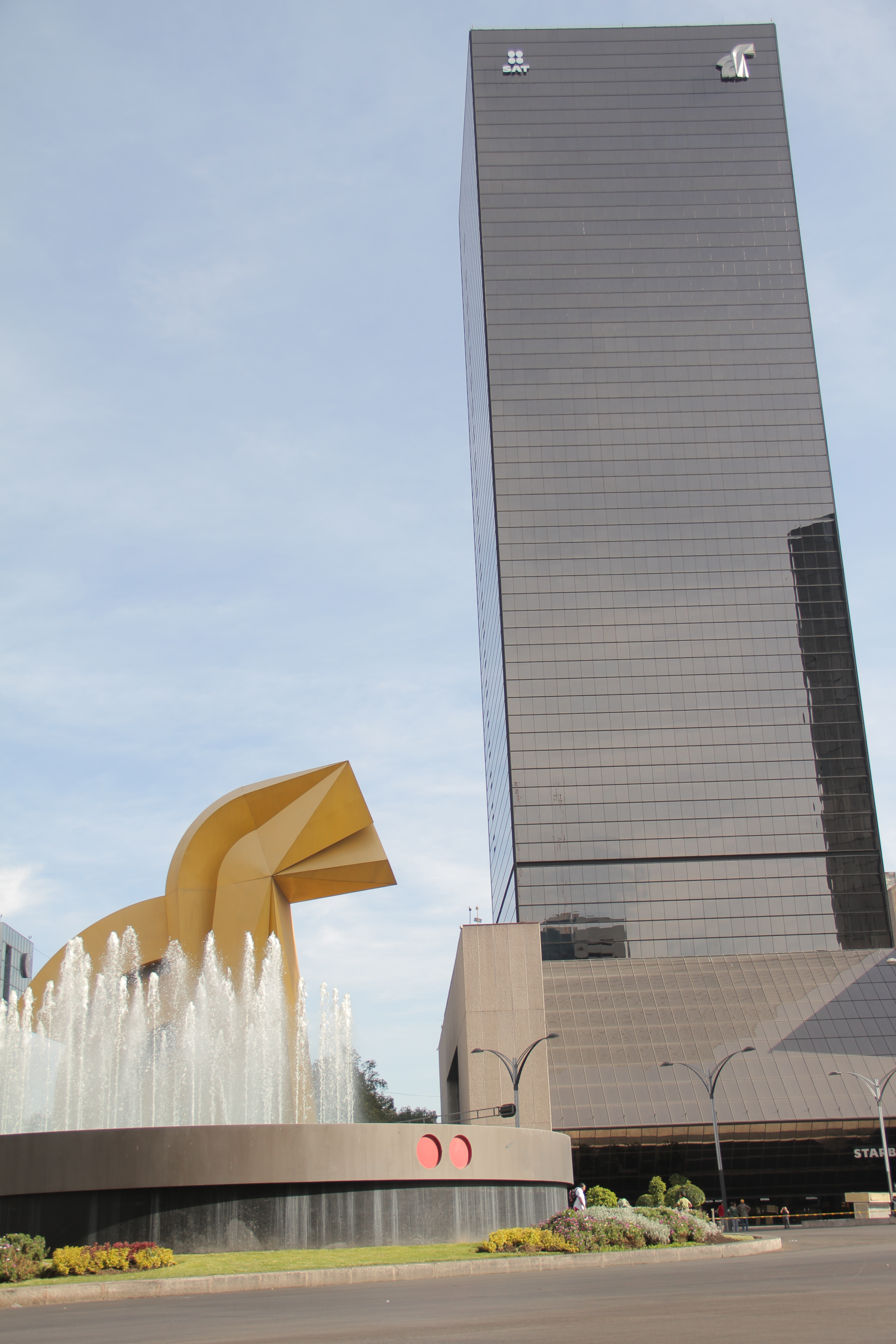
SAT Offices on Paseo de la Reforma in Mexico City.

The Tax Administration Service (Spanish: Servicio de Administración Tributaria, SAT) is the revenue service of the Mexican federal government. The government agency is a deconcentrated bureau of the Secretariat of Finance and Public Credit, Mexico's cabinet-level finance ministry, and is under the immediate direction of the Chief of the Tax Administration Service. The SAT is responsible for collecting taxes, as well as applying fiscal and customs law, with the purpose of funding public spending in a proportional and equitable manner. Additionally, it is the bureau's responsibility to generate and collect information necessary for the formation and evaluation of fiscal policy.

== History ==
On 15 December 1995, the Law of the Tax Administration Service (Ley del Servicio de Administración Tributaria) was published in the Official Journal of the Federation, through which the new bureau was established, endowing it with the highest fiscal authority. In March 1996, a new organic structure for the Secretariat of Finance and Public Credit was authorized and registered, which brought about a number of changes in the organisms and dependencies of the ministry that dealt with taxation, including the General Information, Development, and Evaluation Administration (Administración General de Información, Desarrollo y Evaluación) and the General Directorate of Tax Policy (Dirección General de Política de Ingresos).

The SAT officially began operations on 1 July 1997, with the internal bylaws published on 30 June that same year. The Tax Administration Service substituted the Undersecretariat of Income. In addition, the creation of the new bureau gave rise to the establishment of several different administrative units, as well as a number of state and local administrative dependencies for the purposes of federal tax collection, fiscal auditing, revenue and customs law, as well as the redistribution of federal resources.

== Composition ==
The SAT is composed of a Governing Board, which constitutes its primary decision-making body; the eleven general administrations and units which make up the bureau; and a Chief of the Tax Administration Service, who is appointed and removed by the President with the approval of the Senate. The Chief of the SAT is the primary link between the bureau and the rest of the departments and bureaus which make up the executive branch of the Mexican federal government, as well as all other government entities at the state and local levels, private and social sector actors.

The Governing Board of the SAT is made up of the following individuals:

- Arturo Herrera Gutiérrez as Secretary of Finance;
- Three counsellors appointed by the former from within the finance ministry; and
- Three independent counsellors appointed by the President, two of whom must have been nominated by the National Committee of Fiscal Officials (Reunión Nacional de Funcionarios Fiscales) in accordance with the Law of Fiscal Coordination.

Additionally, the general administrations which make up the SAT are as follows:

- Custom
- Taxpayer Services
- Federal Tax Auditing
- Large Taxpayers
- Legal
- Revenue
- Resources and Services
- Communication and Information Technology
- Evaluation
- Planning
- Foreign Trade Auditing

These, together with the various state and local administrative units make up the main body of the Tax Administration Service.

== See also ==
- Federal Taxpayer Registry (RFC), Mexican tax identification number
