= Unique Population Registry Code =

Identity code for citizens and residents of Mexico

The Clave Única de Registro de Población (translated into English as Unique Population Registry Code also known as Personal ID Code Number) (abbreviated CURP) is a unique identity code for both citizens and residents of Mexico. Each CURP code is a unique alphanumeric 18-character string intended to prevent duplicate entries.

== How CURP codes are built ==
To understand how CURP codes are built, one must first understand Hispano American naming conventions. Full names in Spanish-speaking countries (including Mexican full names) consist of three elements:

1. Given name(s);
2. First surname: the father's first surname; and
3. Second surname: the mother's first surname.

The CURP code is composed of 18 characters that are assigned as follows:

- The first surname's initial and first inside vowel;
- The second surname's initial (or the letter "X" if, like some foreign nationals, the person has no second surname);
- The first given name's initial;
- Date of birth (2 digits for year, 2 digits for month, and 2 digits for day);
- A one-letter gender indicator H for male (hombre in Spanish), M for female (mujer in Spanish), or X for non-binary;
- A two-letter code for the state where the person was born; for persons born abroad, the code NE (nacido en el extranjero) is used;
- The first surname's first inside consonant;
- The second surname's first inside consonant;
- The first given name's first inside consonant; and
- One character ranging from 0-9 for people born before 2000 or from A-Z for people born since 2000; this is generated by the National Population Registry to prevent identical entries.
- Control digit, which checks the validity of the previous 17 digits

For married women, only maiden names are used.

For example, the CURP code for a hypothetical person named Gloria Hernández García, a female, born on 27 April 1956 in the state of Veracruz, could be HEGG560427MVZRRL04.

=== Exceptions ===
Several exceptions to the above rules exist, including:

==== "Ñ" ====
If any step in the above procedure leads to the letter "Ñ" appearing anywhere in the CURP, the "Ñ" is replaced by an "X".

==== Very common given names ====
When a person has two given names and the first given name is María, as is often the case for women in Mexico, or José, in the case of men, the first name will be overlooked and the fourth character will be taken from the second given name's initial. This is because the names María and José are very common and would generate many duplicates if used to generate the code.

For example, if the person were named María Fernanda Escamilla Arroyo, her CURP's first four characters would be EAAF because María does not count for the CURP's fourth character when a second given name is present.

==== Catalog of Inappropriate Words ====
To prevent words from forming that would be deemed palabras altisonantes ('foul-sounding words', such as profanity or pejoratives) in the first four characters of the string, a Catalog of Inappropriate Words (Catálogo de Palabras Inconvenientes) lists many such possible combinations and provides replacements that usually entail changing the second letter, a vowel, into an "X".

== CURP card ==
=== Issuance ===
Initially, a CURP card (cédula) was obtainable at CURP government offices, and also at the Civil Registry, ISSSTE, IMSS, and other government services; the document was printed on green paper at the time. Valid copies of existing CURPs can now be printed on plain paper by visiting an official website.

While an existing CURP can be looked up using one of the .gob.mx sites listed in the external links, it is not possible to get a CURP issued online. There are advertising sites that will generate a "CURP" look alike. Those sites do not enter a new CURP in the national database, they simply generate a number. Two of those advertising sites are listed below. A new CURP can only be applied for in person at the appropriate government office.

=== Description ===
The CURP card is 5.4 cm wide and 8.6 cm long, fits in a wallet and may be laminated for preservation. The front of the card gives the CURP 18-character string, given names and surnames, plus the date of registration and a folio number. The back contains information referencing the document used as proof to originally assign the CURP code (if it was a birth certificate, folio number and issuing municipio are included), and a barcode.

== Use ==
On 23 October 1996, the Presidential Agreement for the Adoption and Use of the Population Registry Unique Code by the Federal Government (Acuerdo Presidencial para la adopción y uso por la Administración Pública Federal de la Clave Única de Registro de Población) was published in the Official Gazette of the Federation. The first CURP issued in 1996 was generated for the then President of Mexico, Ernesto Zedillo Ponce de León. This was done as part of the initial implementation of the system to test its functionality.

The Agreement provides assigning a CURP number to everyone living in Mexico and to Mexicans living abroad.

Currently, the CURP is essential for tax filings, to keep records of companies, schools, membership in government-run health services, passport applications, and other government services.

CURP number is now used in all Civil Registry individual records (birth and death certificates) and certified copies thereof.

Although primarily intended to substitute for a series of registration numbers (IMSS, RFC, IFE), CURP has failed to replace any of these, which continue to use their own code-generation protocols. Nevertheless, INE voting card now contains both the IFE code and the CURP code.

The Personal Data collected, incorporated and processed in the National Database of the Unique Population Registration Key, are used as elements of support in the role of the Secretary of the Interior, through the General Directorate of the National Population Registry and Identidpd in the registration and accreditation of the identity of the country's population and of nationals residing abroad; assigning and issuing the Unique Key of Population Register. This Database is registered in the Person System of the National Institute of Transparency, Access to Information

== CRIP ==
Outside Mexico City, the Clave de Registro e Identidad Personal (Personal Registration and Identification Code) (CRIP) is used, in addition to CURP.

== CUI ==
The creation of a Unique Identity Code (CUI) that could possibly replace the CURP has been proposed, to unify the system throughout Mexico.

== See also ==
- Identity document
- Identity documents in Mexico
- Federal Taxpayer Registry (RFC)
- Voter Credential (INE Card)
- Matrícula Consular
- Mexican passport
