= Federal Taxpayer Registry =

Mexican tax identification number

The Federal Taxpayer Registry (Spanish: Registro Federal de Contribuyentes, RFC), also known as RFC number, is a tax identification number required by any physical or natural person or moral or juridical person (legal entity) in Mexico to carry out any lawful economic activity for which they are obliged to pay taxes, with some exceptions. These people are called taxpayers. The tax identification number must include details of the natural person (e.g. name and date of birth) or legal entity (e.g. name and date of incorporation). Registration is done at the offices of the Tax Administration Service (SAT) of the Secretariat of Finance and Public Credit (SHCP), and is mandatory for all those indicated by the Federal Tax Code. An RFC number is required for all Mexican citizens and residents, even if they are not employed, as this number is necessary to do various tasks such as opening a bank account, applying for a job, buying a vehicle, registering a vehicle, and buying property.

== Requirements ==
The registration process in the Federal Taxpayer Registry (RFC) has different requirements, depending on the type of person who promotes it. It is necessary to validate official identifications, proof of address and the powers of attorney accepted by the SAT, which must be submitted in original.

=== Individuals ===
==== Those who have the Unique Population Registry Code (CURP) ====
The procedure must be carried out in person at an office of the Tax Administration Service (SAT) and the person must bring proper documentation and a thumb drive. For Mexicans living abroad, the procedure must be done in person at an embassy or consulate and the person must bring proper documentation and a thumb drive. Upon completion, the unique acknowledgment of registration in the Federal Taxpayer Registry is obtained, which contains the tax identification card, the homoclave and the two-dimensional barcode.

==== Minors ====
Parents who exercise parental authority or guardianship of minors and act as their representatives, must register an appointment with the SAT and submit the following documentation to the tax authority:

- the child's birth certificate, issued by the Civil Registry;
- the personal identity card, issued by the Secretariat of the Interior through the National Population Registry (original);
- the court decision or the document issued by a notary public, in the case of parental authority or guardianship (certified copy);
- written statement of consent by the parents for one of them to act as the minor's representative, accompanied by their valid official identification (original);
- the current official identification of the parent or guardian acting as the minor's representative (original);
- proof of tax domicile (original);
- if necessary, the power of attorney certifying the legal personality of the legal representative or the power of attorney signed in the presence of two witnesses and the signatures ratified before the tax authorities or before a notary or notary public (certified copy).

===== Minors from the age of 16 who have their own identification and who receive only a salary =====
They must carry out the procedure in person at a SAT office, after an appointment registered on the SAT portal. By submitting the following documents:

- CURP or Personal Identity Card, issued by the Secretariat of the Interior through the National Population Registry;
- a written statement to the Decentralized Administration of Taxpayer Services, signed by the minor, in which he or she indicates under oath to tell the truth his or her willingness to register in the RFC in order to perform exclusively a subordinate personal service and that he or she will not have any other activity until he or she reaches the age of 18;
- proof of tax address;
- valid official identification.

==== Legal entities ====
Pre-registration must be done on the SAT portal. It will not be considered filed if the taxpayer does not comply with the conclusion of the procedure at the SAT office, within ten days following the sending of the application, after an appointment registered on the SAT portal, and the following documentation must be submitted to the tax authority:

- acknowledgment of pre-registration in the RFC;
- notarized constituent document (certified copy);
- proof of tax address;
- power of attorney in the case of legal representation, which certifies the personality of the legal representative (certified copy), or power of attorney signed in the presence of two witnesses and the signatures ratified before the tax authorities or before the Notary Public (original). If it was granted abroad, it must be duly apostilled or legalized and have been formalized before a Mexican Notary Public and, if applicable, have a translation into Spanish by an authorized expert;
- valid official identification of the legal representative;
- they must have a valid RFC code of each of the partners, shareholders or associates within the articles of incorporation. In the event that the valid RFC of the partners, shareholders or associates is not included in the articles of incorporation, the legal representative must submit a written statement containing the corresponding RFC keys;
- some legal entities whose constitution is special may require additional documentation, which can be consulted in file 43/CFF.
- The legal representative must answer the questions asked by the authority, related to the identity, domicile and in general about the tax situation of the legal entity to be registered.

== Determination of the RFC ==
The RFC, just like any other legal document, needs verification. This indicates that each section represents a value or data referring to the person who owns the RFC.

=== Natural person ===
It refers to the person with business activity who has the right or obligation to file taxes. For example, the following RFC VECJ880326:

- VE is the first letter of the paternal surname plus the first internal vowel of the paternal surname.
- C is the initial of the mother's surname. If there is no maternal surname, an (X) is used.
- J is the initial of the first name. If the 4 letters would form an insulting or offensive word, this letter is replaced with an (X).
- 88 is the last two digits of the year of birth.
- 03 is the month of birth.
- 26 is the day of birth. Therefore, in this case it can be deduced that the person was born on 26 March 1988.
- XXX is the homoclave, designated by the SAT through official paper already designated, and depends on some factors that the SAT performs by means of alphanumeric software.

=== Legal entity ===
It refers to the company that has the obligation to file taxes. For example, the following RFC ABC 680524 P-76, where:

- ABC can be the initials of the company or a combination of these.
- 68 represents the year the company was founded.
- 05 is the month of company creation.
- 24 is the day of creation of the company. Therefore, the company was created on 24 May 1968.
- P76 is the homoclave, designated by the SAT through official paper already designated, and depends on some factors that the SAT performs by means of numerical or alphanumeric systems.

== Exceptions ==
When the paternal surname begins with a vowel, the second character will be taken as the next vowel. For example, Fernanda Escamilla Arroyo, the first 4 characters will be EAAF, and not ESAF.

When a person has two names, where the first name is María (women) or José (men), the fourth character will be taken from the first letter of the middle name, instead of the first. This is because the names María and José are excessively common and would generate many duplicates. For example, a person is named María Fernanda Escamilla Arroyo, the first four characters will be EAAF (María does not count towards forming the fourth character).

== Tax identifiers in other countries ==
- Argentina = CUIT (Clave Única de Identificación Tributaria)
- Bolivia = NIT
- Brazil = CNPJ / CPF
- Canada = DUI / NIT
- Chile = RUT / RUN
- Colombia = NIT / RUT
- Costa Rica = NIT
- Cuba = NIT
- Dominican Republic = RNC (Registro Nacional de Contribuyentes)
- Ecuador = RUC
- El Salvador = NIT (Número de Identificación Tributaria)
- France = fiscal number
- Guatemala = NIT / RTU / SAT
- Honduras = RTN
- Indonesia = NPWP (Nomor Pokok Wajib Pajak)/(Tax Identification Number)
- Mexico = RFC (Registro Federal de Contribuyentes) / NSS (Número de Seguridad Social)
- Nicaragua = NIT / RUC
- Panama = RUC (Registro Único del Contribuyente)
- Paraguay = RUC
- Peru = RUC
- Spain = NIF / NIE / CIF
- United States = SSN / TIN / TaxID
- Uruguay = RUT
- Venezuela = RIF (Registro de Identificación Fiscal)

== See also ==
- Unique Population Registry Code (CURP)
- Social Security Number (Mexico) (NSS)
- Voter Credential (INE Card)
- Tax Administration Service (SAT)
