= Matrícula Consular =

Consular identification card issued by the Government of Mexico

Mexican Matrícula Consular
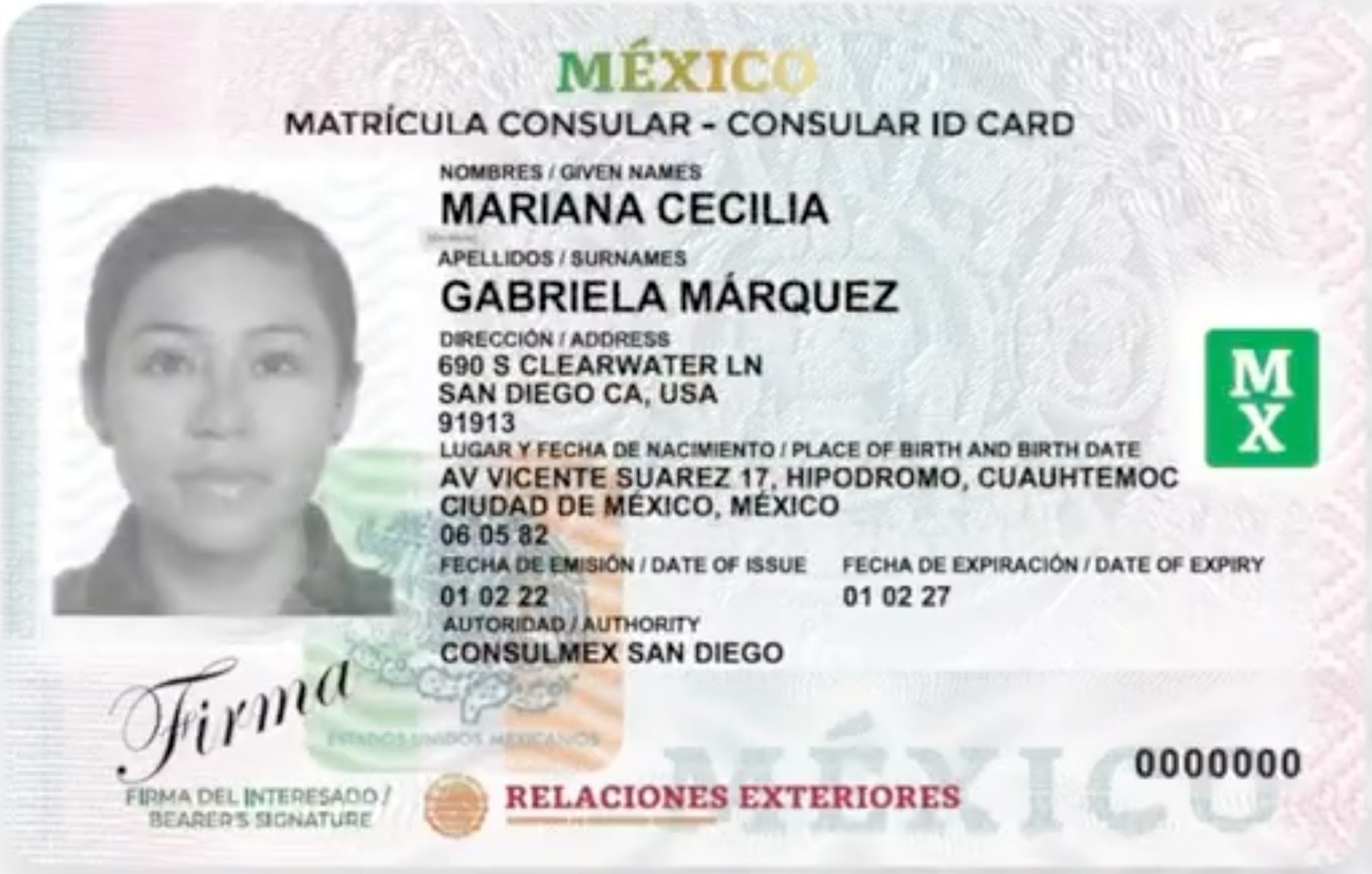
- Mexican Matrícula Consular card issued in 2022 (sample)
- Type: Identity card
- Issued by: (Mexico) Secretariat of Foreign Affairs at Mexican Consulates
- First issued: 1871
- Valid in: Country where issued and Mexico
- Eligibility: Mexican citizenship
- Expiration: 5 years
- Cost: Varies

The Matrícula Consular de Alta Seguridad (MCAS; English: High Security Consular Registration, HSCR), also known as the Mexican Consular Identification Card (Mexican Consular ID Card or Mexican CID Card; Spanish: Tarjeta de Identificación Consular Mexicana, TICM), is an identification card issued by the Government of Mexico through its consulate offices to Mexican nationals residing outside of Mexico. Also known as the Mexican CID card, it has been issued since 1871. The issue of the card has no bearing on immigration status in the foreign country they are residing in. The purpose of the consular ID card is to demonstrate that the bearer is a Mexican national living outside of Mexico. It includes a Government of Mexico issued ID number and bears a photograph and address outside of Mexico of the Mexican national to whom it is issued.

== Use in the United States ==
Several states, municipalities, and businesses in the United States accept the Matrícula Consular (English: Consular Registration) as an official form of identification. Two million Mexican CIDs were issued in 2002–2003. A number of countries have followed suit including Guatemala, Brazil, and Ecuador. Other countries are considering the program, including: Colombia, El Salvador, Honduras, Nicaragua, and Peru. Peru has specifically cited "the acceptance of the Mexican CID card in the United States as a factor contributing to its interest in issuing a CID card." The Vienna Convention on Consular Relations defines consular functions to include issuing passports and travel documents, and the United States Department of State accepts that the issuing of CID cards is a permissible consular function.

On September 14, 2004, the United States Congress voted down a motion to prevent financial institutions from accepting consular IDs. Representative Tom Price announced that the Committee on Financial Services would be convening hearings on the methods permitted by the United States Department of the Treasury applying to the use of the Matricula Consular by banking institutions for the purposes of verification of identity.

The FDIC says "about $18 billion is wired annually from the U.S. to Mexico. Many U.S. banks have welcomed the IDs as a way to get a cut of this activity by profiting from the handling charges on the wires and increased deposits."

== Security issues ==
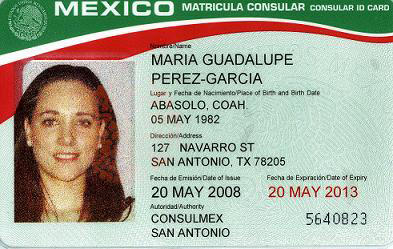
Mexican Matrícula Consular card issued in 2008 (sample).

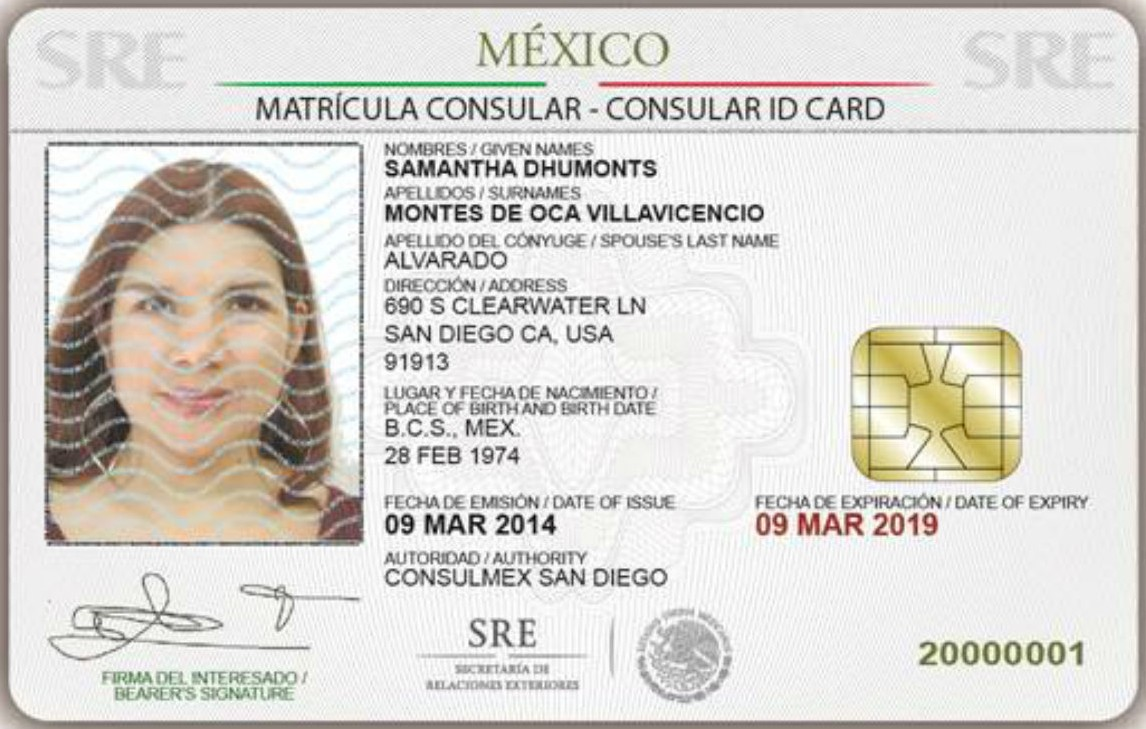
Mexican Matrícula Consular card issued in 2014 (sample). Starting on November 1, 2014, Matrícula Consular cards have additional security measures that address security concerns.

Former New Jersey Representative Scott Garrett (R) stated that the use of MCAS (Matrícula Consular de Alta Seguridad) cards by undocumented immigrants weakens the measures established by the U.S. Congress after "9/11 to safeguard American businesses and financial institutions against fraud and abuse". U.S. law enforcement officials also cite that Matrícula Consular cards are issued by Mexican Consulate without checking the authenticity of the applicant's supporting documentation. In testimony to the Senate Judiciary Committee on June 26, 2003, the Federal Bureau of Investigation (FBI) disclosed and reported that the Matricula Consular card is inherently unreliable and unverifiable as an identification card and is highly vulnerable to fraud, regardless of its security features. The FBI reported that because Mexico lacks a centralized database for their CIDs, they are unable to prevent an individual from receiving multiple CIDs and cannot access information about a CID applicant's identity. An FBI agent said that "Mexican consulates issued CID cards to individuals lacking any proof of identification, as long as they fill out a questionnaire and satisfy the consular official that they are who they claim to be." U.S. federal and local drug enforcement agents have discovered that numerous non-citizen narcotics traffickers obtain Matricula Consular cards using aliases and that their use in the United States presents the United States with a serious criminal threat.

In a 2003 letter to the Secretary of Homeland Security Tom Ridge by the U.S. House Chairmen of the Homeland Security Committee, the Judiciary Committee, the Appropriations Subcommittee on Homeland Security, and the Judiciary Subcommittee on Courts, the Internet, & Intellectual Property, it was written that the Matricula Consular "can be a perfect breeder document for establishing a false identity". They warned that criminals could exploit the cards to conceal their identity as well as launder money and write fraudulent checks. They went on to point out that any acceptance of the cards by the Federal Government "compromises our homeland security" by providing an opportunity for terrorists to freely move about the United States, board planes and transfer funds for terrorist activities.

In January 2003, Nancy Pelosi, the ranking Democrat in the U.S. House of Representatives, pushed for a trial arrangement to give holders of Matricula Consular cards access to the Phillip Burton Federal Building in San Francisco. Due to national security concerns, other members of Congress later revoked the privilege by the summer of 2003. In response to this, Pelosi argued that the vote to restrict the use of the Matrícula Consular was "anti-Hispanic" and that "We in San Francisco know that the Matrícula Consular works". The Matricula Consular card has been embraced by the Democratic Caucus. The Mayor of San Francisco established a policy in December 2001 for the city and county of San Francisco to accept the Mexican CID as a valid form of ID. The mayor's office issued a press release stating that the card would prevent those in the Mexican immigrant community lacking an acceptable identification from being jailed or deported when committing minor offenses.

The United States Department of Agriculture warned that the Matricula Consular card is not sufficient to determine legal immigration status nor eligibility for the U.S. Food Stamp Program. The department also advised that home addresses on these cards may not be current "given the potential mobility of this population".

Bank on California, a program launched by Governor Arnold Schwarzenegger in December 2008, encourages financial institutions to accept the Mexican CID, Guatemalan CID and other CID cards as primary identification for opening bank accounts.

The Center for Immigration Studies, a conservative research organization, argued in a research brief that the Matricula is becoming a shield that hides criminal activity for two reasons: first, the holder's identity was not verified when the card was issued, and second, police in jurisdictions that accept the Matricula are less likely to run background checks on card holders picked up for minor infractions. The organization claimed that the Matricula consular is useful in the United States only for the undocumented, since legal immigrants, have U.S. government-issued documents, and that the objective the card's supporters is to achieve quasi-legal status for "Mexican illegals in the United States".

Anti-immigration activists also claimed the Federal Government of Mexico responded to the September 11 attacks by aggressively lobbying for the ID.

== Mexican Consular Identification Card ==
The Mexican Consular Identification Card (CID; Spanish: Tarjeta de Identificación Consular Mexicana, TICM), also referred to as the Matrícula Consular de Alta Seguridad (MCAS; English: High Security Consular Registration), is an official document issued by Mexican consulates. It certifies the bearer's Mexican nationality and registration within the consular district. The card is issued in accordance with Mexican law and international agreements, including the Vienna Convention on Consular Relations of 1963.

Mexican consulates have historically provided these identification cards to nationals residing abroad, regardless of their immigration status. More than 180 countries, including the United States and Mexico, have ratified the Vienna Convention, which recognizes consular functions such as issuing documents and protecting nationals abroad.

=== Legal Basis ===
Article 5(d) of the Vienna Convention identifies the issuance of passports and official documents to nationals as a core consular function. Subsections (g) and (h) outline the responsibility of consulates to safeguard the interests of minors and deceased nationals. Consular ID cards fall within these functions.

=== Requirements ===
To obtain a Mexican Consular ID card, individuals must present:

- Proof of Mexican nationality;
- An official photo identification;
- Proof of residence within the consular district.

The card cannot be issued to individuals undergoing judicial or administrative processes in Mexico.

=== Background ===
The MCAS was introduced in 2002. In 2006, its security features were enhanced to include biometrics, 2D barcodes, and internationally recognized safeguards.

In 2014, Mexico's Ministry of Foreign Affairs released a new version of the card with advanced security measures such as:

- Guilloché patterns;
- Laser-engraved elements;
- Ghost images and ultraviolet features;
- 2D barcodes;
- Pearlescent ink;
- Microtext and nanotext;
- Holographic laminates;
- A cryptographic chip containing encrypted data.

=== Use and Recognition in the United States ===
The CID card is accepted as valid identification by financial institutions, law enforcement agencies, and government entities in both Mexico and the United States. In Arizona, where individuals of Mexican origin make up over half of the state's foreign-born population, the card has been used to open bank accounts, access credit, and participate in legal and financial transactions.

=== Legal History in Arizona ===
In 2011, Arizona Senate Bill SB1465 prohibited state and local agencies from recognizing the CID card, citing security concerns.

In 2015, Arizona Governor Doug Ducey issued a proclamation acknowledging Mexico as the state's largest trading partner and encouraged the legislature to reconsider the ban. Starting in 2019, Consul General Jorge Mendoza Yescas led outreach efforts with local leaders, including mayors, sheriffs, and legislators, to advocate for the card's acceptance.

In 2020, state lawmakers Rep. Tony Rivero, Rep. David Cook, and Sen. Paul Boyer introduced SB1420, aimed at restoring the legal recognition of biometric consular ID cards. The bill was approved by the Arizona legislature and signed into law by Governor Ducey on March 5, 2021.

=== Consular Presence in Arizona ===
Mexico's consular network in Arizona includes two Consulates General (Phoenix and Nogales) and three Consulates (Douglas, Tucson, and Yuma).

== See also ==
- Unique Population Registry Code (CURP)
- Federal Taxpayer Registry (RFC)
- Mexican passport
- Voter Credential (INE Card)
- Driving licence in Mexico
