= Institute for Mexicans Abroad =

Mexican government agency

The Institute for Mexicans Abroad (Instituto de los Mexicanos en el Exterior, IME) is a Mexican government agency that supports Mexican citizens and others of Mexican descent who live and work in other countries. Its primary focus is Mexican immigrants going to the United States.

Founded in 2003, IME is run by a council called the CC-IME. IME is under the control of the Mexican Foreign Ministry.

== Overview ==
Mexican emigrants overwhelmingly go to the United States. According to Pew Research Center, in 2012 over 11.2 million unauthorized immigrants were living in the United States, 52%, or 5.85 million, of whom were Mexican nationals. In another 2012 analysis, Pew estimated that 33.7 million people in the United States were of Mexican origin. The Mexican diaspora to the United States"

"has become a economic resource for Mexico, as a result of the social and familial micro-networks that have allowed it to grow in a contravention of the U.S. Immigration and border control policies."

Mexican immigrants send large amounts of money by remittance to families in Mexico. Because they are contributing to Mexico's economic growth, they want a voice in Mexico. However, because many immigrants are undocumented, they are frequently seen as stateless. Stateless people are typically "invisible" in both their country of origin as well as their new country. This created the need for organizations like the IME.

Both the United States and Mexico wanted to maintain control of Mexican migrants to the United States. However, these goals frequently result in conflicts between the two nations that affect not only migrants, but also Mexican-Americans. Mexican-Americans may never have lived in Mexico and have no desire to do so. It means that it is understood that their cultural origins derive from Mexico, which can add on to the multinational conflicts and the need to be involved both within the United States Policies and the Mexican Policies. This has led to multiple organizations being formed in order to establish the connection between nations.

== History ==
=== Before IME ===
In 1986, the US Congress passed the Immigration Reform and Control Act. It allowed immigrants to apply for US residency, It eased travel between the United States and Mexico, especially for undocumented people. Mexico also joined the General Agreement on Tariffs and Trade, GATT This new economic connection between Mexico and the United States meant new policies for migrants.

In 1989, the Mexican Government introduced Program Paisano. It was meant to assist Mexican migrants entering the United States in getting due process from the U.S. government. Also in 1989., Grupos Beta de Protección a Migrantes, was established, creating a type of transnational police protecting migrants at the border.

In 1990, the Mexican Government started Programa para las Comunidades Mexicanas, (PCME). PCME granted Mexican migrants an ID known as the matricula consular.

Mexico has had to view their policy issues with a new perspective due to migrants "...[pressuring] for change in Mexico's policies and politics - change that came to further modify state-diaspora relations." This forced Mexico to support improvements in immigration policies. Mexican officials have stated that their deliberations have been thoroughly thought out regarding both national and international policy, which in return, there have been organizations that help migrants, and the reason IME eventually came to be. In order to take advantage of conditions happening both in the United States and Mexico regarding politics and their people and migrants, "...the Mexican government took the important step of establishing a new institutional framework to promote ties between Mexicans on both sides of the border."

=== IME history ===
IME was conceptualized in 2002 and inaugurated on April 16, 2003.

Beginning in 2010, IME set new goals for the organization:

- to further connect with educated and experienced Mexican professionals abroad.
- to reach a much larger foreign audience
- In conjunction with the Instituto de la Mujer, to create women's networks through the CC-IME's members that would focus on "domestic violence, self-esteem, staying in school, scholarships," and health related issues.

IME also made plans for 2015 to create fifty-six local councils, nine regional reunions, and various general meetings. In these meetings, they were to mention education and the need for financial aid, for all, but more so based on the dreamers and the younger generations of Mexicans. Then, they will also mention health, political and legal issues, culture and media, businesses, and the CC-IME that leave the post and are replaced with new members.

== Background ==
=== Programs ===
IME provides programs and services in health, education, and networking. Mexicans have access to the IME through 50 Mexican Consular offices in the United States, and six offices in Canada.

One IME program is the Jornadas Informativas parallel program. The IME invites Mexican professionals or community leaders living in the United States to Mexico D.F. for a two- to three-day program. The goal is for the participants to make their contributions and state their thoughts about challenges involving Mexico and the diaspora. This program helps the IME create and expand relationships between Mexico, the consulate, and the migrant leaders.

IME successfully pushed to have the United States accept an updated version of the matricula consular. IME also claims to have achieved greater recognition of its members in United States offices.

One issue is how IME programs relate to the United States and Mexico. The attempts to consolidate and construct connections and identity between Mexican communities in the United States and Mexico have different consequences for each country.

"[T]he power from the Mexican diaspora in terms of political influence over the voting choices of their families still in Mexico has been slowly bleeding into Mexican politics."

Mexican politicians have started campaigning within the United States for office in Mexico. They know that voters in Mexico will consider the opinions and advice of their relatives in America on political matters.

== CC-IME ==
=== Structure ===
The CC-IME is a "formal and institutionalized assembly of networks, with a fixed membership that is convened twice yearly and is divided into specialized committee." CC-ME provides a forum for Mexican leaders to debate and look for a common agenda. It has 128 members who reside outside of Mexico and are elected by migrants living in their geographic districts. They are members for a three-year period and cannot be re-elected. About two-thirds of CC-IME members were born in Mexico and about one-third are Mexican-American.

During its first term, the CC-IME divided itself into six committees to focus on different policies. The committees consider ideas from their constituents and bring them up to the Mexican government. These include concerns on policies, the diaspora, and managing how to gather resources in order to put into action the IME programs.

=== Issues ===
Some critics argue that the CC-IME lacks any real power and participation in it is a mockery. CC-IME representative Joel Magallan, stated that it was not about actually creating change and having power. It was more-so the idea of being able to talk about such issues, stay connected, and in the run, possibly create political change; that the power they receive is to engage with communities outside of Mexico, and that this was exactly what was occurring.

Other criticism related to the behavior of some male CC-IME behavior towards women. Some women alleged sexist behavior in the first meeting. This led to the creation of the Code of Behavior, which mandates respect for both genders. All six commission coordinators agreed to implement it.

One issue is that "in some consular jurisdictions, elections were controlled by local power groups that interfered in the election processes to prevent outsiders from being elected."

- "Outsiders" may not have theknowledge, control, and strategy to create a common agenda and strengthen the relationships within CC-IME. Without that, their ideas and contributions may be ignored.
- The election process for CC-IME members is not clear, raising concerns with corruption.
- Native Mexicans, and Mexican-Americans in CC-IME have differing perspectives on policies, and the process for resolving these differences is unclear. This is due to the idea that there has to be loyalty and to some extent a form of equality for the migrants, and some issues might not be understood with those that are not actual migrants themselves.
