= Mexican passport =

Passport of the United Mexican States issued to Mexican nationals

Mexican passport; Pasaporte mexicano
- The front cover of a current Mexican biometric passport with the coat of arms of Mexico and chip
- Type: Passport
- Issued by: Mexico —Secretariat of Foreign Affairs
- First issued: January 2008 (First edition Machine Readable Passport); 27 August 2012 (Second edition Machine Readable Passport); 12 June 2016 (Third edition Machine Readable Passport); October 2021 (Biometric Passport)
- Purpose: Identification
- Valid in: All Countries
- Eligibility: Mexican citizenship
- Expiration: 3, 6, or 10 years (18 years or older)
- Cost: MXN 1 730 (3 years); MXN 2 350 (6 years); MXN 4 120 (10 years)
- Size: 32 Pages

The Mexican passport (Spanish: Pasaporte mexicano) is the passport issued to Mexican citizens for the purpose of travelling abroad. The Mexican passport is also an official ID and proof of Mexican citizenship. According to the July 7, 2026 Henley Passport Index, holders of a Mexican passport can visit 157 (of 195) countries without a visa, ranking Mexico 22nd in terms of global travel freedom.

Mexico transitioned to a biometric passport in 2021 called the electronic passport (pasaporte electrónico).

== Types of passports ==
- Ordinary Passport – Issued for ordinary travel, such as holidays and business trips.
- Diplomatic Passport – Issued to Mexican diplomats, top ranking government officials, diplomatic couriers, and family of the previous on the list, another type of identification Cédula diplomática mexicana is issued for travel when not in official duties, it may be accompanied by an ordinary passport.
- Official Passport – Issued to individuals representing the Mexican government on official business

== Physical appearance ==
Mexican passports are dark green, with the Mexican Coat of Arms in the center of the front cover and the official name of the country "Estados Unidos Mexicanos" (United Mexican States) around the coat of arms. The word "Pasaporte" is inscribed below the coat of arms, the international biometric symbol below this, and "Mexico" (as the country is commonly known) above. The Mexican passport contains many different security features, some of them visible only under a black light.

=== Identity information page ===
Each passport has a biographical information page and a signature page. Illustration: biographical information page and signature page – right. Mexico is currently on the 'G' and 'N' series passport.

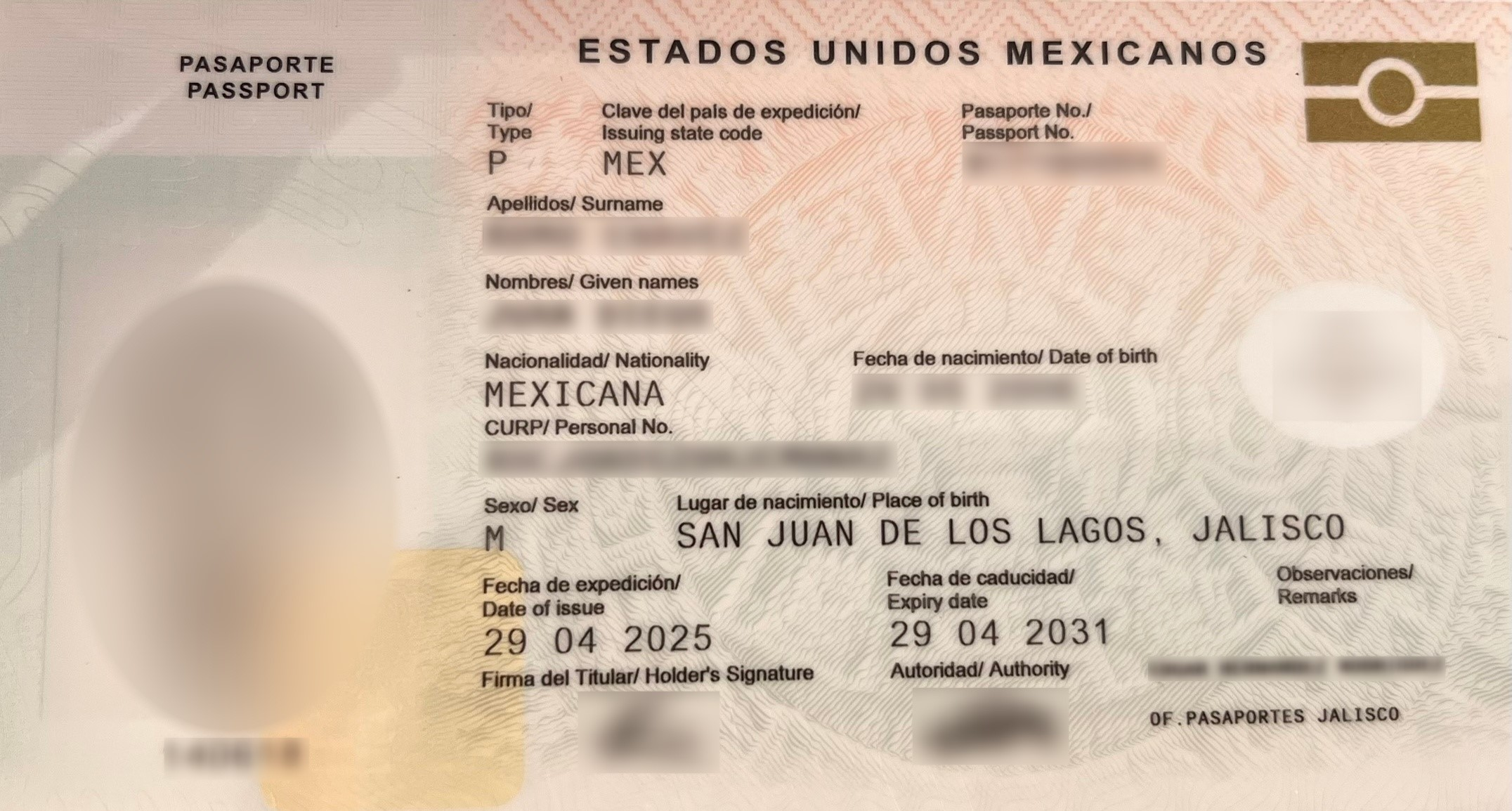
The identity information page on the 2021 revision of the Mexican biometric passport.

- Photo of passport holder (digital)
- Type (P)
- Country code (MEX)
- Passport no.
- Surnames (Includes Father/Mother's maiden name)
- Given names
- Nationality
- Observations
- Date of birth
- Personal ID number (CURP)
- Sex
- Place of birth
- Date of issue
- Authority
- Date of expiration
- Hologram picture in the center-right and national symbols scattered throughout the biographic page.
- The passports of minors (18 and under), as well as those of people unable to express their will, also contain the image, full name, nationality, CURP and signature of those that have custody of the minor, or represent the person unable to express their will.

The biographical information page ends with the Machine Readable Zone. The passport includes 32 pages for visas and passport stamps, each featuring the coat of arms of one of the 31 Mexican states and Mexico City.

=== Requirements ===
Requirements for first time applicants that are over the age of eighteen.

1. Personally attend to any Secretaría de Relaciones Exteriores (SRE) delegation or SRE affiliated office, with an appointment.
2. Fill with black ink, and by hand and in print the application for an ordinary passport book (Form OP-5). The application can be obtained for free at any of the branches of the SRE or the Office of State or Municipal Liaison SRE.
3. Proof of Mexican nationality by presenting an original and a photocopy of any of the following documents:

a) Certified copy of birth certificate issued by the Mexican civil registry office. Birth registration should not be time-barred (must have occurred within the first three years of life), if exceeded temporality, see section "Additional Documentation for birth certificates with untimely registration" this is referred to as "registro extemporáneo" under Mexican law;
b) Certified copy of birth certificate issued by a consular office abroad *.
c) Certificate * Copy of Mexican nationality;
d) Declaration of Mexican nationality by birth *;
e) Naturalization Certificate*, and
f) Certificate of Citizenship Identity issued by the Secretary of the Interior

4. Prove identity with an original and a photocopy of any of the following official documents with photograph and signature of the holder, the data should agree closely with those of the document that is proving nationality:

a) Cédula de Identidad Ciudadana issued by the Secretaría de Gobernación;
b) Matrícula Consular (Certificate of Consular Registration, Consular ID Card);
c) Naturalization Certificate;
d) Certificate of Mexican nationality;
e) Declaration of Mexican nationality by birth;
f) Voting Card issued by the National Electoral Institute;
g) Cartilla de Identidad del Servicio Militar Nacional Liberada;
h) Professional Certificate;
i) Professional Degree;
j) Letter of internship;
k) A valid identification issued by the Instituto Nacional de las Personas Adultas Mayores;
l) Credential of medical services from a public health institution or social security badges with a photo that has been sealed with official seal of the institution. If credentials are in digital format, they can be accepted even if the seal does not overlap the photograph;
m) For retired or pensioned credentials issued by an institution of social security, badges have to be sealed with the official seal, along with the signature and title of the person who issued it. If credentials in digital format, they can be accepted even if the seal does not overlap the photograph and
n) National Credential for Persons with Disabilities issued by the Sistema Integral para la Familia (DIF).
o) Embassies and consulates abroad may also accept identity documents issued in the country or region in which it is located such as but not limited to, drivers licenses, passports, residence permits or visas.

=== Fees ===
In Mexico, fees are paid either online or at an affiliated Mexican bank that receives payments for passports. Citizens that live abroad pay at the consulate or embassy in which they are applying. There is a 50% discount for people that are over the age of sixty, people with disabilities, and agricultural workers. In order to be able to receive a discount, the person must show proof at the time of payment. All fees below are current as of 2025.

- Mexican 1-year expiration passport: 885 MXN (Mexican Peso)

Issued to children under three years of age and in cases of a justified emergency to adults who cannot fulfill all of the requirements for an ordinary passport issuance, as well as to individuals living outside Mexico that need consular protection.

- Mexican 3-year expiration passport: 1,730 MXN

Issued to all individuals over the age of three.

- Mexican 6-year expiration passport: 2,350 MXN

Issued to all individuals over the age of three.

- Mexican 10-year expiration passport: 4,120 MXN

Issued only to adults over the age of eighteen in Mexico and some embassies and consulates abroad.

=== Languages ===
The textual portions of the Mexican passports are printed in Spanish, English and French. In the updated passport design or the "Pasaporte Electronico" French is absent with the SRE deciding to no longer print any text in the passports in that language.

=== Passport message ===
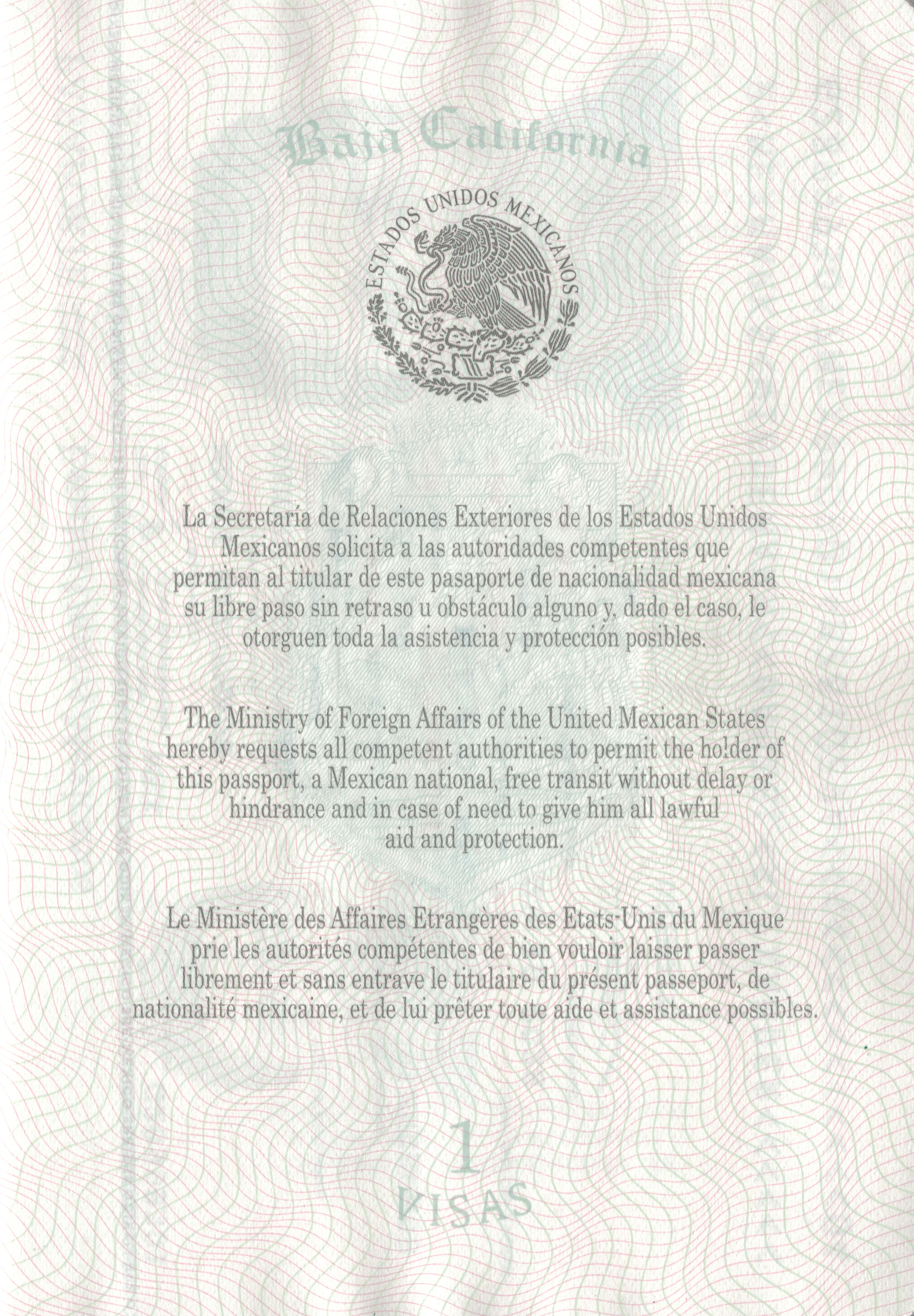
The message page in the Mexican passport.

The passports contain a note from the issuing state that is addressed to the authorities of all other states, identifying the bearer as a citizen of that state and requesting that he or she be allowed to pass and be treated according to international norms. The note inside the Mexican passports state:

In Spanish,

"La Secretaría de Relaciones Exteriores de los Estados Unidos Mexicanos solicita a las autoridades competentes que permitan al titular de este pasaporte de nacionalidad mexicana su libre paso sin retraso u obstáculo alguno y, dado el caso, le otorguen toda la asistencia y protección posibles."

in English,

"The Ministry of Foreign Affairs of the United Mexican States hereby requests all competent authorities to permit the holder of this passport, a Mexican national, free transit without delay or hindrance and in case of need to give him all lawful aid and protection."

and in French.

"Le Ministère des Affaires Étrangères des États-Unis du Mexique prie les autorités compétentes de bien vouloir laisser passer librement et sans entrave le titulaire du présent passeport, de nationalité mexicaine, et de lui prêter toute aide et assistance possibles."

== Visa requirements ==
Countries and territories with visa-free or visa on arrival entry for holders of regular Mexican passports Mexico Visa free access Visa on arrival eVisa Visa available both on arrival or online Visa required

As of 2026, Mexican citizens have visa-free or visa on arrival access to 156 countries and territories, ranking the Mexican passport 20th in the world according to the Henley Passport Index.

== Gallery of historic images ==
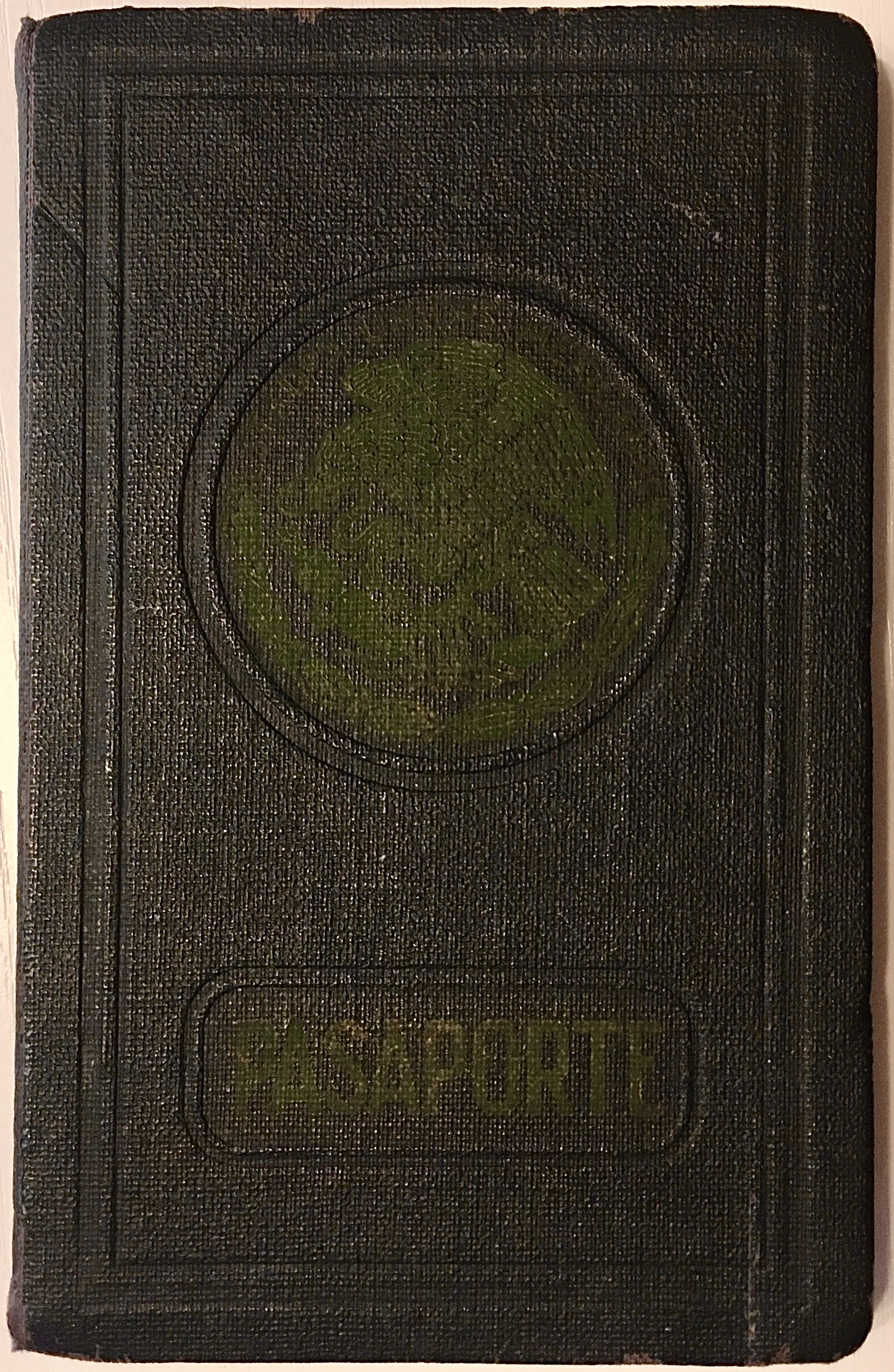
Mexican passport issued in 1952

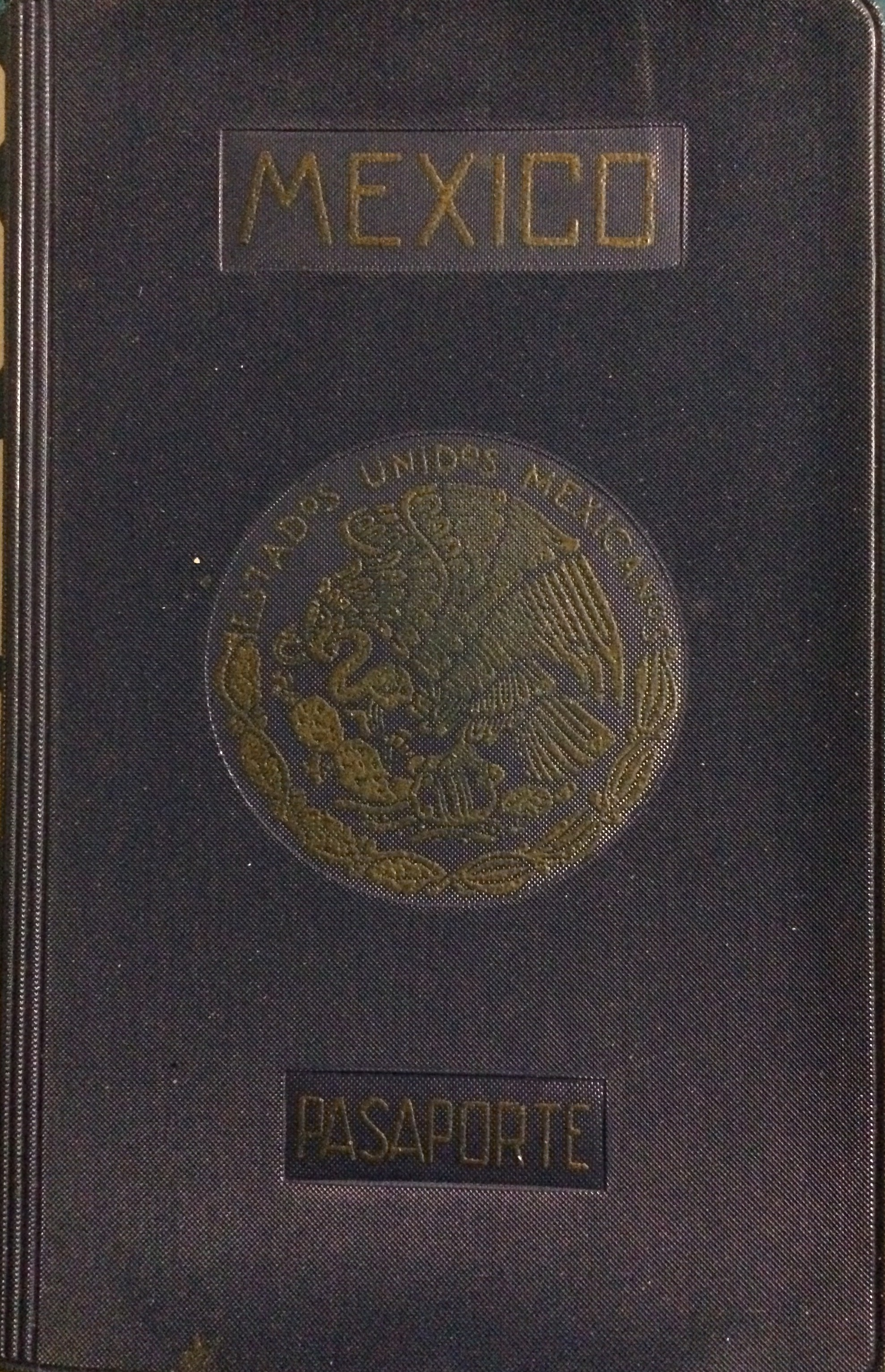
Mexican passport issued in 1962

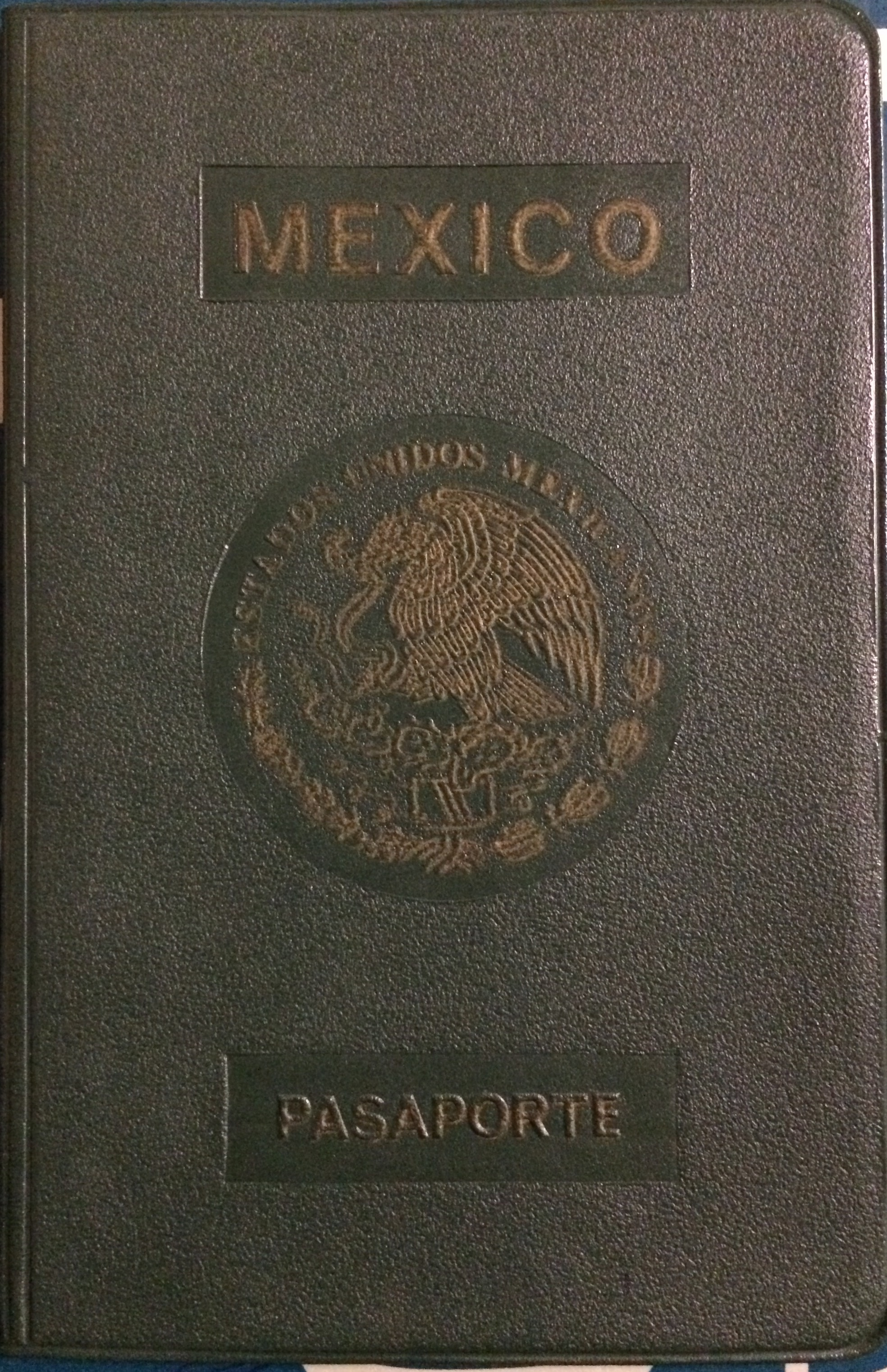
Mexican passport issued in 1981

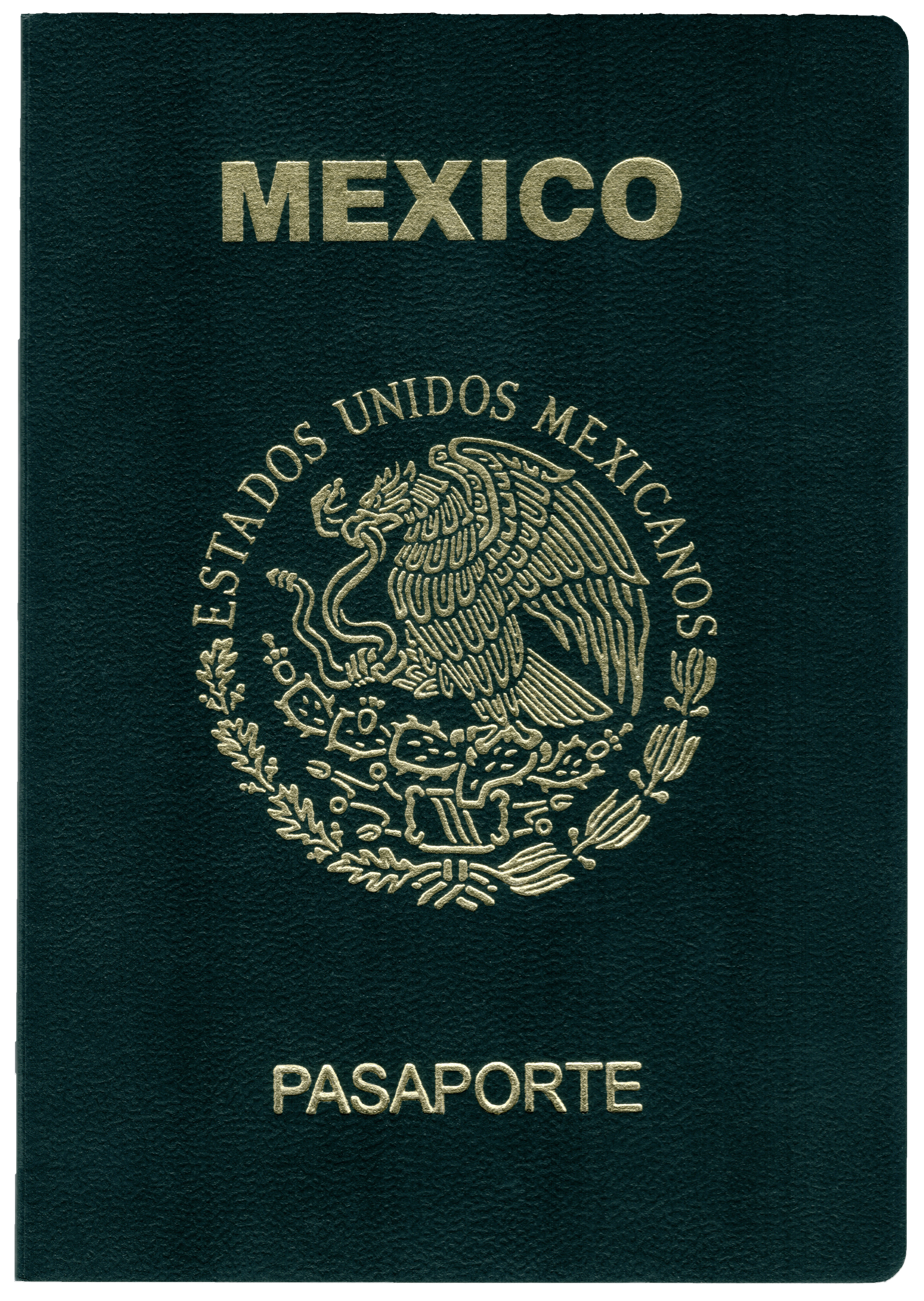
Mexican passport issued in 2016

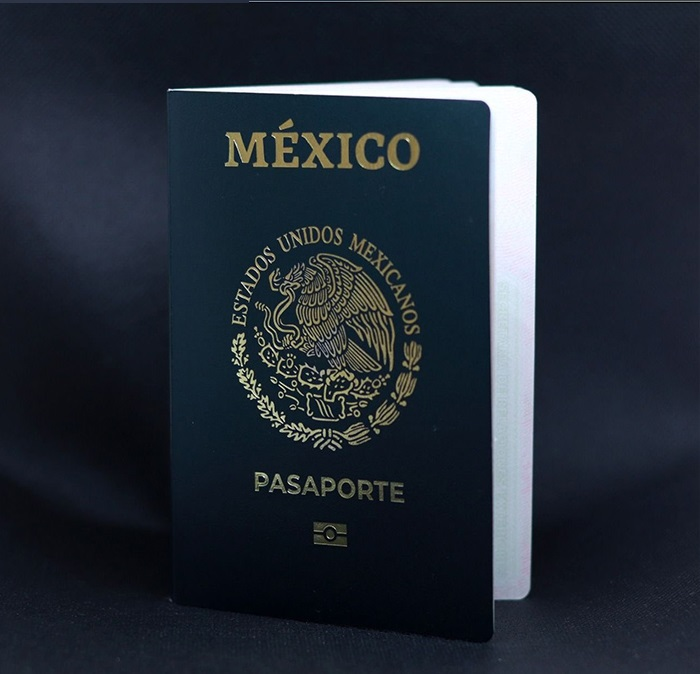
Mexican passport issued in 2021

== See also ==
- List of diplomatic missions of Mexico
- List of diplomatic missions in Mexico
- Mexican nationality law
- Matrícula Consular
- Voter Credential (INE Card)
- Secretariat of Foreign Affairs
- Visa requirements for Mexican citizens
- Visa policy of Mexico

== Notes ==
- (1) holders of diplomatic identity cards enjoy the same rights and privileges as holders of diplomatic passports .
- (2) diplomatic identity cards are usually accompanied by an ordinary passport
