= Mexican nationality law =

Nationality Law Ley de Nacionalidad

Congress of the Union
- Citation: L.N., vigente desde 1998
- Territorial extent: Mexico
- Enacted by: LVII Legislature
- Signed by: President of Mexico
- Signed: December 12, 1997
- Commenced: March 20, 1998
- Administered by: Secretariat of Foreign Affairs
- Status: Amended

Nationality in Mexico is defined by multiple laws, including the 30th article of the Constitution of Mexico and other laws. The Constitution's 32nd article specifies the rights granted by Mexican legislation to Mexicans who also possess dual nationality. This article was written to establish the norms in this subject in order to avoid conflicts which may arise in the case of dual nationality. This law was last modified in 2021.

In general terms, Mexican nationality is based on both the principle of jus soli and the principle of jus sanguinis. The Mexican constitution also makes a distinction between nationals of Mexico and citizens of Mexico. The legal means to acquire nationality and formal membership in a nation differ from the relationship of rights and obligations between a national and the nation, known as citizenship.

== Acquisition of nationality ==
According to the 30th article of the Constitution of Mexico, there are two ways in which a person can acquire Mexican nationality: by birth or by naturalization.

=== Nationality by birth ===
The Mexican Constitution states that Mexican nationals by birth are:

- people born on Mexican territory regardless of their parent's nationality.
- people born abroad to at least one parent who is a national of México.
- people born on Mexican vessels or aircraft that are either for war or merchant.

=== Nationality by naturalization ===
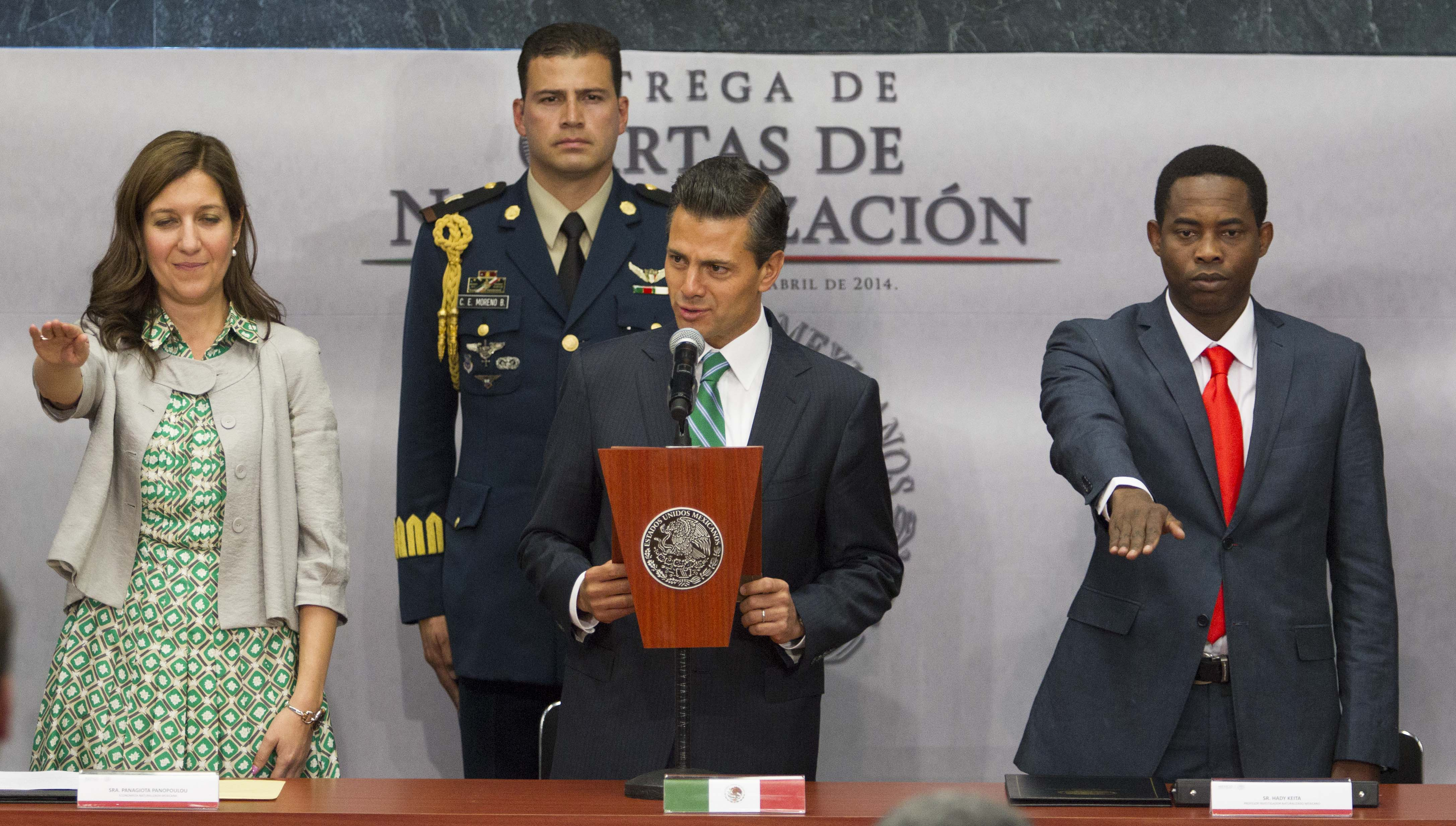
President Enrique Peña Nieto swears in new Mexicans at a naturalization ceremony, including Dr. Panagiota Panopoulou (left) and Dr. Hady Keita (right), researchers from Greece and Guinea, respectively.

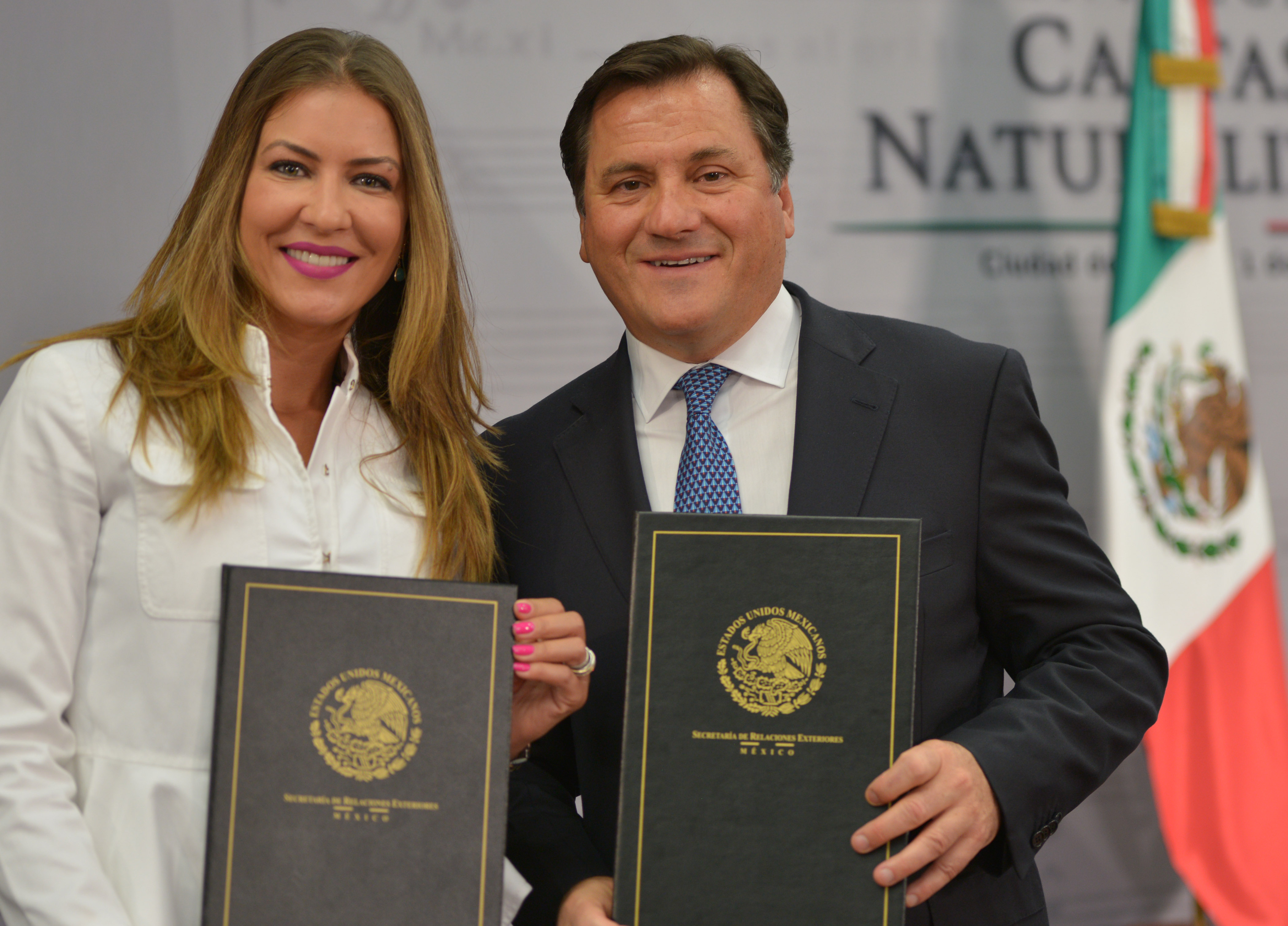
Newly naturalized Mexican citizens with their naturalization certificates in ceremonial folders.

Mexicans by naturalization are:

- those who obtain from the Secretariat of Foreign Affairs a letter of naturalization and
- an individual married to a Mexican national residing in Mexico who fulfills the requirements set forth in the Mexican nationality law: to have lived with the spouse for two years immediately prior to the date of the application.

The Nationality Law establishes also that a foreigner who wishes to naturalize must do the following:

- present the application to the Secretariat of Foreign Affairs;
- formulate the renunciation of the person's country of origin, and take the oath of sole nationality to Mexico. Once this has been given;
- prove knowledge of the Spanish language and of Mexican history; integration to the national culture; and
- prove residence in Mexico for five years immediately prior to the submission of the application, or

- two years of residency if:

- a direct descendant of a Mexican by birth; or
- the mother or father of a Mexican by birth; or
- a national of a Latin American or Iberian country; or
- to the judgment of the Secretariat, she or he has performed or created outstanding works in a cultural, social, scientific, technical, artistic, sports or business area that benefit the nation, in which case, the foreigner is not required to have resided in the country for the number of years prescribed in the law; or

- one year of residency if adopted by a Mexican national, as well as all minors who are second generation descendants or have been under tutelage of a Mexican national.

== Possession of Mexican nationality ==
Mexican nationality entails several obligations set forth in the 31st article of the Constitution, namely:

- to take their children or pupils to public or private schools to receive preschool, primary and secondary education; as well as military education as and if required by the law;
- to present themselves in the days and hours designated by the municipalities in which they reside to receive civic and military instruction;
- to enlist and serve in the Mexican Armed Forces (which includes Mexican Army, Mexican Air Force, Mexican Navy, and Mexican Navy Infantry Force/Marine Corps) to defend the independence, territory, honor, rights and interest of the nation;
- to contribute to the public expenditures through their taxes;

Documents that serve as proof of nationality are the following:

- birth certificates;
- letter of naturalization;
- passports;
- OP7 (minor’s passport) and
- consular identity cards (Matricula consular) if they have a digital photograph, a magnetic band and a holographic identification.

== Mexican citizenship ==
Mexican nationality grants the right to obtain a Mexican passport. The one shown above is the biometric passport issued after 2021.

Mexican law differentiates between nationality and citizenship. Nationality is the attribute of the person in international law that describes their relationship to the State, whereas citizenship is given to those nationals (those who hold Mexican nationality) who have certain rights and responsibilities before the State. The 34th article of the Mexican constitution establishes that Mexican citizens are those Mexican [nationals] who are 18 years of age or older, and who have an "honest way of living". Mexican citizens have these rights:

- vote in all elections;
- be elected in all elections
- gather or associate freely to participate in the political affairs of the nation;
- enlist in the Mexican Army or the Mexican National Guard to defend the Republic and its institutions, and
- exercise the right of petition.

Mexican law also distinguishes between naturalized citizens and natural-born citizens in many ways. Under the Mexican constitution, naturalized citizens are prohibited from serving in a wide array of positions, mostly governmental. Naturalized Mexicans cannot occupy any of following posts:

- The Mexican military during peacetime
- Policeman
- Captain, pilot, or crew member on any Mexican-flagged vessel or aircraft
- President of Mexico
- Member of the Congress of Mexico
- Member of the Supreme Court of Mexico
- Governor of a Mexican state
- Mayor or member of the legislature of Mexico City

== Loss of nationality and loss of citizenship ==
Article 37 of the constitution establishes that no authority can deprive Mexicans by birth (natural born Mexicans) of their nationality, as defined in the Nationality law, in the acquisition of another nationality. However, naturalized Mexicans may lose their nationality by doing the following:

- voluntarily acquiring another nationality, presenting themselves as foreigners or accepting nobility titles that imply a submission to a foreign state;
- acquiring another nationality by means of a naturalization process.
- living for five years continuously outside of Mexico

Even though Mexican nationals by birth can never involuntarily lose their nationality, Mexican citizenship, and thus its prerogatives, may be lost if a person does the following:

- accepts nobility titles from foreign countries;
- serves in a foreign government without the authorization of the Congress of the Union;
- accepts or uses foreign distinctions, titles or functions, without the authorization of the Congress of the Union, with the exception of those that are literary, scientific or humanitarian in nature;
- helps a foreign citizen or government against Mexico in any diplomatic claim or before an International Tribunal.

Mexican nationals, both by birth or naturalized, can give up their nationality.

== Multiple nationality ==
The Mexican nationality law acknowledges that a Mexican by birth may possess another nationality. If that is the case, however, such an individual must always enter and leave the country as a Mexican (by presenting a Mexican proof of nationality). The law also established that regardless of possession of another nationality, an individual will always be considered a Mexican national and cannot claim protection from a foreign country in certain cases:

- participating in capital of an entity or a company if they are constituted according to the Mexican law; if
- giving credits to such entities; and if
- possessing property in Mexican territory.

All government positions in which the Constitution or Mexican law explicitly require that someone be "Mexican by birth" are restricted to those who hold multiple nationality, even if they are Mexican by birth. (ie, policeman, President, etc.).

== Visa requirements ==
Visa requirements for Mexican citizens Mexico Visa free access Visa on arrival eVisa Visa available both on arrival or online Visa required

Visa requirements for Mexican nationals are administrative entry restrictions by the authorities of other states placed on nationals of Mexico. In 2018, Mexican nationals had visa-free or visa on arrival access to 159 countries and territories, ranking the Mexican passport 22nd in terms of travel freedom according to the Henley visa restrictions index.

== History ==
Though Mexico gained its independence from Spain in 1821, nationality was not defined in any constitution of the territory until 1836. However, the Decree of 16 May 1823, required the automatic naturalization of a wife and children when a foreign man naturalized as Mexican. This was reconfirmed in a statute of 14 April 1828. The Constitution of 1836 provided that Mexican nationals were those who descended from a Mexican father or those who were born in the territory to a foreign father and chose Mexican nationality upon reaching the age of majority. In 1843, a new constitution was drafted which established that nationality was based upon birth in the territory, or if abroad, to children of Mexican fathers. Only in the case of the father being unknown was the mother able to pass on her nationality to her children and in no case could her nationality be derived by her husband. The 1854 Governmental Decree on Foreigners and Nationality, promoted by Santa Anna, mirrored the Napoleonic Code in its requirements for married women to derive their nationality from their husbands. The 1854 Law confirmed the 1843 constitutional provisions on nationality, but in 1856 after a period of unrest, a provisional constitutional statute extended the provisions of children born abroad to include Mexican mothers.

The Constitution of 1857 confirmed the provisional conditions with the added requirement those who were naturalized or born abroad had to relinquish their nationality of origin. The constitution also codified that marriage was a civil contract regulated by the state and established a civil registry. This meant that marriages conducted under religious rites without a civil ceremony and registration were invalid, making children born of such unions illegitimate under the law and wives not subject to loss of nationality. The reverse was also true, in that civil marriage legitimized the children of the union and automatically conferred the nationality of the husband upon the wife. The 1857 constitution also contained a provision that foreigners who had children, or acquired real estate, in the territory would be naturalized and carried no provisions for expatriating any spouse by virtue of their marital state. (Note: The only provisions in the 1857 Constitution for loss of citizenship were service to a foreign government or acquiring other nationality.) But, because the Article automatically bestowed nationality unless a foreigner expressly refused it upon purchasing property or having children, Mexican courts were divided on its interpretation. In theory, a Mexican woman who had been expatriated by her marriage to a foreigner would have automatically been repatriated upon having a child. However, the Mexican Supreme Court in 1881 upheld a decision depriving married sisters Felícitas and Enriqueta Tavares of the right to engage in buying ships for their family business, which was restricted to nationals. The court based the ruling upon the fact that they were married to Spanish men, and thus no longer had Mexican nationality, under the 1854 Nationality Law, despite being mothers.

In 1884 a Civil Code was developed which legally incapacitated married women. Two years later, Ignacio Luis Vallarta became the architect of a new law on naturalization. The Law of Alienship and Naturalization (Ley de Extranjería y Naturalización) of 1886 would largely remain in force until 1934. Under its terms, birthright nationals were limited to those born in the territory or born abroad and the legitimate, legitimized, or illegitimate but legally recognized children of a Mexican father. Nationality could only be derived from the mother if the father was unknown or the child was illegitimate and unrecognized by the father. Foundlings born in Mexico were also considered birthright nationals. The law continued the practice that married women and minor children automatically derived the nationality of their husbands and independent nationality for married women was banned. To prevent the possibility of statelessness of a wife, there was a provision in the law that if the husband's nation did not grant a Mexican woman married to a foreigner his nationality, she could retain her birthright nationality. If the husband died, a former Mexican national who was a widow could retrieve her nationality by establishing residence in Mexico and advising the proper authorities. A woman who had gained nationality from marriage to a Mexican could relinquish it by acquiring other nationality.

During the Mexican Revolution the Constitution of 1917 was drafted. It based nationality upon being born of Mexican parents. It allowed children born to foreigners within the territory to declare that they claimed Mexican nationality upon reaching their majority and it also accepted naturalization. The new constitution was silent upon the matter of married women's nationality, just as it was regarding women's ability to exercise the rights of citizenship. Articulation of the exclusion was unnecessary because the 1886 Law of Alienship was still in force. The 1917 Constitution also did away with the ambiguity in the law regarding property ownership, clarifying that foreigners could not own property. Wives who had been expatriated by marriage were able to declare to the Secretary of Foreign Affairs that they were birthright Mexican nationals and would not appeal to a foreign government for protection of their property rights. A Law on Family Relations (Ley sobre Relaciones Familiares) was passed in 1917 which broadened the civil rights of women, but maintained the dependent nature of nationality for married women. At the same time, it became a distinct policy to promote the mestizoization of the nation by promoting measures to integrate the indigenous population while dissuading assimilation of foreigners who were deemed to be too culturally different. Some states drafted legislation, like the 1923 state law of Sonora, barring the marriage of Mexicans with Chinese, which was discussed as proposed national legislation at the end of the 1920s. Though no national legislation was passed, circulars issued from the immigration authorities in 1923, 1927, and 1933 excluded from immigration blacks, Arabs, Armenians, Lebanese, Malaysians, Palestinians, Syrians, and those who were Hindu. A circular issued in 1934 and marked "strictly confidential" (Spanish: estrictamente confidencial) barred various races including black skinned people and Australians, yellow skinned people and Mongolians, olive skinned people and Malays, and listed Jews, Latvians, Lithuanians, Poles, and Romani people as undesirable. (Note: Schwarz cites "'Circular No. 157', 27 de abril de 1934", as the official document for this policy.)

In 1928 a new Civil Code was drafted which under Article 2 stated that administration of civil rights could not be subjugated on the basis of sex, but simultaneously continued the practice of marital authority, allowing husbands to curtail the activities of their wives. Between 1931 and 1934, Chinese expulsion orders, primarily carried out in Sinaloa and Sonora, but also occurring in other states like Baja California and Chiapas, resulted in a large number of families of women who had lost their nationality by virtue of marriage being deported to China. In 1933, Manuel J. Sierra, Eduardo Suxrez, and Basilio Vadillo, the Mexican delegates to the Pan-American Union's Montevideo conference, signed the Inter-American Convention on the Nationality of Women, which became effective in 1934, without legal reservations. A new Law of Alienship and Naturalization was promoted in that year, which provided in Article 4 that marriage to a foreigner no longer resulted in women losing their nationality; however, Article 2(2) limited the provision to include only if the couple established their domicile in Mexico. Residing outside the territory continued to expatriate wives of foreigners. Also in 1934 an amendment to the Constitution's Article 30 was drafted which allowed wives who had lost citizenship because of marriage to foreigners to repatriate as naturalized, rather than birthright, Mexicans. The amendment also allowed Mexican women whether birthright or naturalized to pass on their nationality to their children, but retained the requirement that the father had to be unknown.

In 1937, at the outbreak of the Sino-Japanese War in 1937, President Lázaro Cárdenas allowed 400 women who had lost their nationality by marrying Chinese men to repatriate with their children. Other small groups of Chinese-Mexicans returned in the 1940s and 1950s; however, an official repatriation effort did not occur until 1960. Despite the changes, into the 1950s court cases evaluated married women's nationality. In a 1951 case, the Supreme Court ruled that a Mexican woman had not lost her nationality by marrying a Japanese man. Another case in 1956 dealt with whether a woman married to a foreigner could own property in Mexico. The Supreme Court decision ruled that as she did not lose her nationality upon marriage, she could own property. In 1969, an amendment to Article 30 of the constitution allowed derivative nationality for all children born abroad to a Mexican mother. Legislation passed in 1974 granted equal nationality for men and women. Reforms in 1997 refined birthright nationality to limit Mexican nationality to children born abroad for one generation. In 1998, provisions were made that Mexicans by birth could not be expatriated and dual nationality was confirmed for birthright Mexicans, but not for naturalized Mexicans. In 2021, a constitutional reform came into force, allowing the descendants of a Mexican national who are born abroad nationality beyond the first generation.

== See also ==
- Visa policy of Mexico
- Visa requirements for Mexican citizens
- Immigration to Mexico
