= Embassy of Turkey, Mexico City =

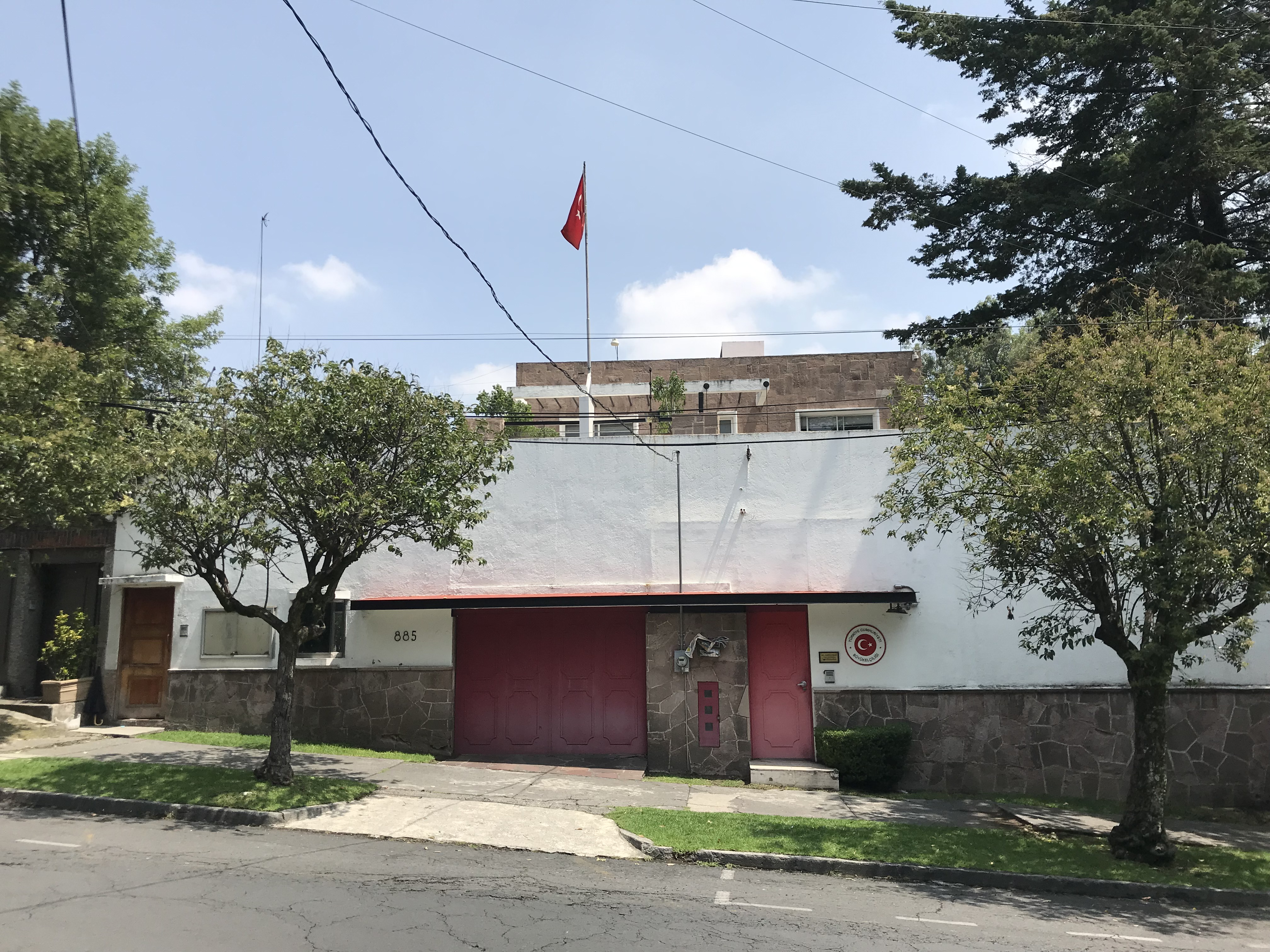
The embassy building

The Embassy of Turkey in Mexico City is the diplomatic mission of the Republic of Turkey to the United Mexican States. It is located in the Lomas de Chapultepec neighborhood of Mexico City.

== History ==
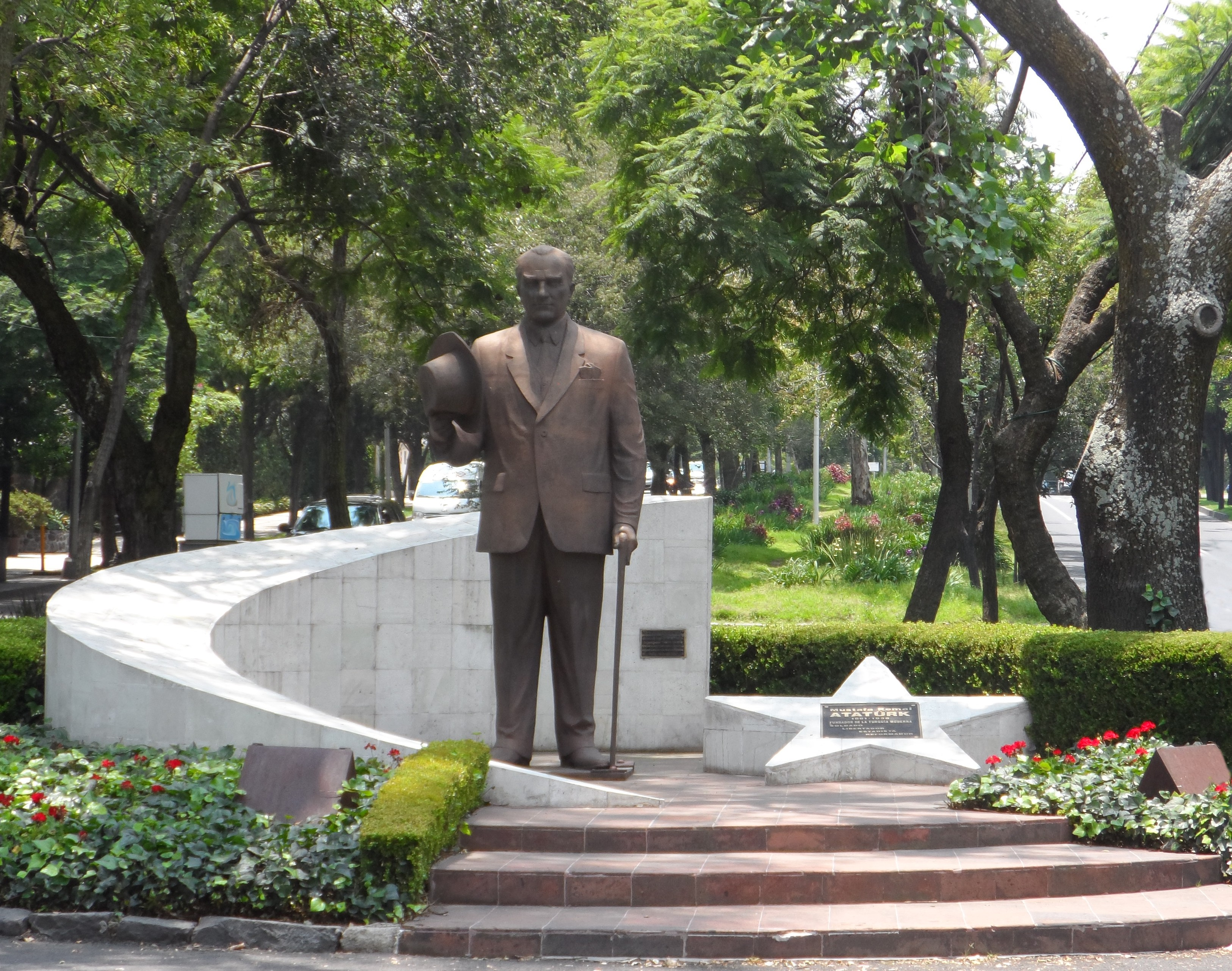
Atatürk memorial on Paseo de la Reforma in Mexico City

The Embassy of Turkey in Mexico City was established in 1931, eight years after Turkey was formed following the demise of the Ottoman Empire. Since then, the embassy has played an important role in maintaining diplomatic relations between Turkey and Mexico.

== Services ==
The Embassy of Turkey in Mexico City provides a range of services to Turkish citizens living in Mexico and Mexican citizens who wish to visit or travel to Turkey. These services include consular services, such as passport and visa issuance, and assistance with legal and financial issues. The embassy also promotes cultural exchange between Turkey and Mexico through a range of activities, such as exhibitions, concerts, and film screenings.

== Ambassador ==
As of 2023, the Ambassador of Turkey to Mexico is İlhan Kemal Tuğ. The ambassador is the chief diplomat of Turkey in Mexico and is responsible for overseeing the embassy's activities and representing Turkey's interests in Mexico.

== Memorial statue ==
Mexico City's Paseo de la Reforma avenue houses a statue of Mustafa Kemal Atatürk, the founder of the Republic of Turkey.

== See also ==
- List of diplomatic missions of Turkey
- List of diplomatic missions in Mexico
