= List of diplomatic missions in Mexico =

There are currently 87 embassies in Mexico City, and many countries maintain consulates and/or consulates-general in many Mexican cities (not including honorary consulates).

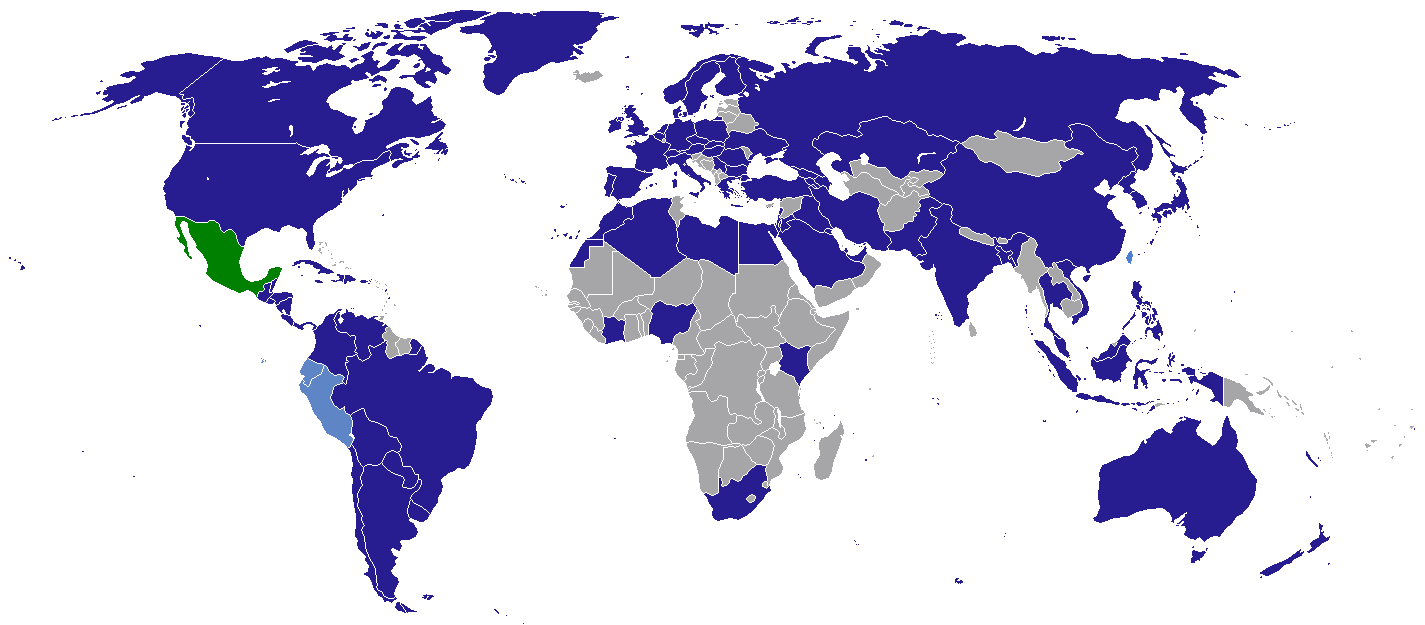
Diplomatic missions in Mexico Mexico Countries with an embassy in Mexico Missions in Mexico

== Diplomatic missions in Mexico ==
=== Diplomatic missions in Mexico City ===
Country	Mission type	Address	Locality	Photo	Website
Algeria	Embassy	Sierra Madre 540	Lomas de Chapultepec		
Argentina	Embassy	Paseo de las Palmas 1685	Lomas de Chapultepec		
Argentina	Consulate-General	Paseo de la Reforma 373, 4th floor	Cuauhtémoc		
Armenia	Embassy	Monte Everest 1055	Lomas de Chapultepec		
Australia	Embassy	Rubén Darío 55	Polanco		
Austria	Embassy	Sierra Tarahumara 420	Lomas de Chapultepec		
Azerbaijan	Embassy	Calle Bosques de la Reforma 580	Bosques de Reforma		
Bangladesh	Embassy	Sierra Nevada 601	Lomas de Chapultepec		
Belgium	Embassy	Avenida Alfredo de Musset 41	Polanco		
Belize	Embassy	Calle Bernardo de Gálvez 215	Lomas de Chapultepec		
Bolivia	Embassy	Calle Goethe 104	Anzures		
Brazil	Embassy	Lope Diaz de Armendariz 130	Lomas de Chapultepec		
Brazil	Consulate-General	Paseo de las Palmas 405	Lomas de Chapultepec		
Bulgaria	Embassy	Paseo de la Reforma 1990	Lomas de Chapultepec		
Canada	Embassy	Calle Schiller 529	Polanco		
Chile	Embassy	Calle Andrés Bello 10, 18th floor	Polanco		
Chile	Consulate-General	Campos Elíseos 188, 14th floor	Polanco		
China	Embassy	Avenida San Jerónimo 217 B	La Otra Banda		
China	Consular section	Rio de la Magdalena 172	La Otra Banda		
Colombia	Embassy	Avenida Paseo de la Reforma 412, 19th floor	Cuauhtémoc		
Colombia	Consulate-General	Paseo de la Reforma 379, 1st floor	Cuauhtémoc		
Costa Rica	Embassy	Calle Río Po 113	Cuauhtémoc		
Cuba	Embassy	Presidente Masaryk 554	Polanco		
Czech Republic	Embassy	Calle Cuvier 22	Anzures		
Denmark	Embassy	Tres Picos 43	Polanco		
Dominican Republic	Embassy	Paseo de Lomas Altas 132	Lomas de Chapultepec		
Dominican Republic	Consulate-General	Avenida Horacio 124	Polanco		
Ecuador	Interest Section	Tennyson 217	Polanco		
Egypt	Embassy	Alejandro Dumas 131	Polanco		
El Salvador	Embassy	Temístocles 88	Polanco		
Finland	Embassy	Monte Pelvoux 111, 4th floor	Lomas de Chapultepec		
France	Embassy	Campos Elíseos 339	Polanco		
France	Consulate-General	Calle Lafontaine 32	Polanco		
Georgia	Embassy	Monte Everest 905	Lomas de Chapultepec		
Germany	Embassy	Calle Horacio 1506	Polanco		
Greece	Embassy	Calle Monte Ararat 615	Lomas de Chapultepec		
Guatemala	Embassy	Avenida Explanada 1025	Lomas de Chapultepec		
Guatemala	Consulate-General	Avenida Insurgentes Sur 667	Colonia Nápoles		
Haiti	Embassy	Sierra Vertientes 840	Lomas de Chapultepec		
Holy See	Embassy	Juan Pablo II 118	Guadalupe Inn		
Honduras	Embassy	Alfonso Reyes 220	Condesa		
Hungary	Embassy	Av. Montes Auvernia 310	Lomas de Chapultepec		
India	Embassy	Calle Musset 325	Polanco		
Indonesia	Embassy	Calle Julio Verne 27	Polanco		
Iran	Embassy	Paseo de la Reforma 2350	Lomas de Chapultepec		
Iraq	Embassy	Paseo de la Reforma 1875	Lomas de Chapultepec		
Ireland	Embassy	Calle Goldsmith 53	Polanco		
Israel	Embassy	Sierra Madre 215	Lomas de Chapultepec		
Italy	Embassy	Paseo de las Palmas 1994	Lomas de Chapultepec		
Ivory Coast	Embassy	Calle Alfredo Tennyson 67	Polanco		
Jamaica	Embassy	Avenida de las Palmas 1340	Lomas de Chapultepec		
Japan	Embassy	Paseo de la Reforma 243, 9th floor	Cuauhtémoc		
Jordan	Embassy	Sierra Fría 489	Lomas de Chapultepec		
Kazakhstan	Embassy	Fray Garcia Guerra 175	Lomas de Chapultepec		
Kenya	Embassy	Sierra Leona 235	Lomas de Chapultepec		
Kuwait	Embassy	Paseo de los Tamarindos 98	Lomas de Chapultepec		
Lebanon	Embassy	Julio Verne 8	Polanco		
Libya	Embassy	Boulevard de los Virreyes 1035	Lomas de Chapultepec		
Malaysia	Embassy	Calle Monte Libano 1015	Lomas de Chapultepec		
Morocco	Embassy	Avenida Explanada 1255	Lomas de Chapultepec		
Netherlands	Embassy	Calle Volcán 150, 2nd floor	Lomas de Chapultepec		
New Zealand	Embassy	Avenida Jaime Balmes 8, 4th floor	Polanco		
Nicaragua	Embassy	Fernando de Alencastre 136	Lomas de Chapultepec		
Nigeria	Embassy	Sierra Gorda 145	Lomas de Chapultepec		
North Korea	Embassy	Calle Halley 12	Anzures		
Norway	Embassy	Boulevard de los Virreyes 1460	Lomas Virreyes		
Pakistan	Embassy	Boulevard de los Virreyes 1015	Lomas de Chapultepec		
Palestine	Embassy	Paseo de la Reforma 2621	Lomas de Reforma		
Panama	Embassy	Calle Sócrates 339	Polanco		
Paraguay	Embassy	Avenida Homero 415	Polanco		
Peru	Embassy	Paseo de la Reforma 2601	Lomas de Chapultepec		
Peru	Consulate-General	Presidente Masaryk 29, 2nd floor	Polanco		
Philippines	Embassy	Avenida Thiers 111	Anzures		
Poland	Embassy	Calle Cracovia 40	San Ángel		
Portugal	Embassy	Calle Alpes 1370	Lomas de Chapultepec		
Qatar	Embassy	Paseo de la Reforma 2290	Lomas de Chapultepec		
Romania	Embassy	Calle Sofocles 311	Polanco		
Russia	Embassy	Avenida José Vasconcelos 204	Condesa		
Sahrawi Republic	Embassy	Calle Descartes 91	Anzures		
Saudi Arabia	Embassy	Paseo de las Palmas 2075	Lomas de Chapultepec		
Serbia	Embassy	Avenida Montañas Rocallosas 515	Lomas de Chapultepec		
Singapore	Embassy	Ruben Dario 281, 10th Floor	Polanco		
Slovakia	Embassy	Julio Verne 35	Polanco		
South Africa	Embassy	Andres Bello 10, 9th floor	Polanco		
South Korea	Embassy	Lopez Diaz de Armendariz 110	Lomas de Chapultepec		
Spain	Embassy	Calle Galileo 114	Polanco		
Spain	Consulate-General	Calle Galileo 114	Polanco		
Sweden	Embassy	Paseo de las Palmas 1225	Lomas de Chapultepec		
Switzerland	Embassy	Paseo de las Palmas 405, 11th floor	Lomas de Chapultepec		
Republic of China (Taiwan)	Taipei Economic and Cultural Office	Bosques de la Reforma 758	Lomas de Chapultepec		
Thailand	Embassy	Alpes 365	Lomas de Chapultepec		
Turkey	Embassy	Monte Libano 885	Lomas de Chapultepec		
Ukraine	Embassy	Blvd. de los Virreyes 810	Lomas de Chapultepec		
United Arab Emirates	Embassy	Paseo de la Reforma 505	Lomas de Chapultepec		
United Kingdom	Embassy	Paseo de la Reforma 350, 20th floor	Cuauhtémoc		
United States	Embassy	Presa Angostura 225	Nuevo Polanco		
Uruguay	Embassy	Calle Homero 411, 10th floor	Polanco		
Uruguay	Consulate-General	Calle Hegel 149, 1st floor	Polanco		
Venezuela	Embassy	Calle Schiller 326	Polanco		
Vietnam	Embassy	Sierra Ventana 255	Lomas de Chapultepec		

== Other missions in Mexico City ==
Country/Territory/Organization	Mission type	Address	Locality	Photo	Website
Basque Country	Delegation	Avenida Horacio 1213	Polanco		
Catalonia	Delegation	Leibnitz 77, 1st floor	Anzures		
European Union	Delegation	Paseo de la Reforma 1675	Lomas de Chapultepec		
Quebec	General Delegation	Avenida Taine 411	Polanco		

== Consular missions ==
=== Acapulco ===
- Canada Consular Agency
- United States Consular Agency

=== Acayucan ===
- El Salvador Consulate-General
- Guatemala Consulate
- Honduras Consular Agency

=== Arriaga ===
- Guatemala Consulate

=== Cabo San Lucas ===
- Canada Consular Agency
- United States Consular Agency

=== Cancún ===
- Canada Consular Agency
- Colombia Consulate-General
- Cuba Consulate-General
- Guatemala Consulate-General
- United Kingdom Consulate-General
- United States Consular Agency

=== Ciudad Hidalgo ===
- Guatemala Consulate

=== Ciudad Juárez ===
- El Salvador Consulate-General
- Guatemala Consulate-General
- Honduras Consulate-General
- United States Consulate-General

=== Comitán ===
- Guatemala Consulate

=== Guadalajara ===
- Canada Consulate
- Colombia Consulate
- El Salvador Consulate-General
- Spain Consulate-General
- United States Consulate-General

=== Hermosillo ===
- United States Consulate-General

=== León ===
- Japan Consulate-General

=== Matamoros ===
- United States Consulate-General

=== Mazatlán ===
- Canada Consular Agency
- United States Consular Agency

=== Mérida ===
- Cuba Consulate-General
- United States Consulate

=== Monterrey ===
- Canada Consulate-General
- Cuba Consulate-General
- El Salvador Consulate-General
- France Consulate-General
- Guatemala Consulate-General
- Honduras Consulate-General
- Spain Consulate-General
- United States Consulate-General

=== Nogales ===
- United States Consulate-General

=== Nuevo Laredo ===
- United States Consulate-General

=== Oaxaca City ===
- El Salvador Consulate-General
- Guatemala Consulate-General
- United States Consular Agency

=== Piedras Negras ===
- United States Consular Agency

=== Playa del Carmen ===
- Argentina Consulate
- Canada Consular Agency
- United States Consular Agency

=== Puerto Vallarta ===
- Canada Consular Agency
- United States Consular Agency

=== San Luis Potosí ===
- El Salvador Consulate-General
- Guatemala Consulate-General
- Honduras Consulate-General

=== San Miguel de Allende ===
- United States Consular Agency

=== Tapachula ===
- El Salvador Consulate-General
- Guatemala Consulate-General
- Haiti Consulate-General
- Honduras Consulate-General

=== Tenosique ===
- Guatemala Consulate-General

=== Tijuana ===
- China Consulate-General
- El Salvador Consulate-General
- Guatemala Consulate-General
- Haiti Consulate-General
- Honduras Consulate-General
- United States Consulate-General

=== Tuxtla Gutiérrez ===
- Guatemala Consulate-General

=== Veracruz City ===
- Cuba Consulate-General
- Honduras Consulate-General
- Panama Consulate-General

=== Villahermosa ===
- El Salvador Consulate-General
- Honduras Consulate-General

== Non-resident embassies ==
Resident in Washington, D.C. unless otherwise noted:

- Andorra (New York City)
- Angola
- Afghanistan (Ottawa)
- Bahamas (Nassau)
- Bahrain
- Barbados (Panama City)
- Belarus
- Benin
- Bosnia
- Botswana
- Brunei
- Burkina Faso
- Cape Verde
- Central African Republic
- Cambodia
- Chad
- Comoros (New York City)
- Congo-Brazzaville
- Congo-Kinshasa
- Croatia
- Djibouti (Havana)
- Equatorial Guinea
- Eritrea
- Estonia
- Ethiopia
- Fiji
- Gambia
- Ghana
- Guinea (Havana)
- Guinea-Bissau (New York City)
- Guyana
- Iceland
- Kyrgyzstan
- Laos
- Latvia
- Lesotho
- Lithuania
- Luxembourg
- Mali
- Madagascar
- Malawi
- Maldives (New York City)
- Malta
- Mauritius
- Micronesia (New York City)
- Moldova
- Mongolia
- Myanmar
- Namibia
- Nauru (New York City)
- Nepal
- North Macedonia
- Oman
- Palau
- Papua New Guinea
- Rwanda
- Sierra Leone
- Senegal
- Seychelles (New York City)
- Slovenia
- Sudan
- Sri Lanka
- Syria (Havana)
- South Sudan
- Tanzania
- Timor-Leste
- Trinidad and Tobago
- Togo
- Tajikistan
- Turkmenistan
- Tunisia
- Uganda
- Vanuatu
- Yemen
- Zambia
- Zimbabwe

== Diplomatic missions to open ==
Country	Mission	Ref.
Croatia	Embassy	
Ghana	Embassy	

== Former missions ==
Host city	Sending country	Mission	Year closed	Ref.
Mexico City	Albania	Embassy	1991	
Mexico City	Angola	Embassy (Note: Resident in Washington, D.C., United States of America)	2018	
Mexico City	Cyprus	Embassy	2020	
Mexico City	East Germany	Embassy	1990 (Note: Existed as a commercial mission in between 1968 and 1973, when it opened as an embassy after formal diplomatic relations were established.)	
Mexico City	Ecuador	Embassy (Note: Continues as an interest section)	2024	
Mexico City	Ethiopia	Embassy	1990	
Mexico City	Ghana	Embassy	Unknown	
Mexico City	Suriname	Embassy	1986	
Guadalajara	Ecuador	Consulate	2013	
Mazatlan	United States	Consulate	1993	
Monterrey	Colombia	Consulate	2002	
Monterrey	Ecuador	Consulate	2024	
Tapachula	Ecuador	Consulate	2020	
Tapachula	Nicaragua	Consulate	2024	
Veracruz City	United States	Consular Agency	2016	

== See also ==
- Foreign relations of Mexico
- List of diplomatic missions of Mexico
- Visa requirements for Mexican citizens
