= Visa requirements for Mexican citizens =

Administrative entry restrictions

A Mexican passport

Visa requirements for Mexican citizens are administrative entry restrictions by the authorities of other states placed on citizens of Mexico.

As of 2026, Mexican citizens have visa-free or visa on arrival access to 157 countries and territories, ranking the Mexican passport 22nd in the world according to the Henley Passport Index.

== Visa requirements map ==
Visa requirements for Mexican citizens holding ordinary passports Mexico Visa not required / ETA Visa not required (conditional) Visa on arrival eVisa Visa available both on arrival or online Visa required

== Visa requirements ==
Country	Visa requirement	Allowed stay	Notes (excluding departure fees)
Afghanistan	eVisa	30 days	e-Visa : Visitors must arrive at Kabul International (KBL).
Albania	Visa not required	90 days	
Algeria	Visa required		Persons may be denied entry if entering with a passport containing visas or stamps issued by Israel.; Visitors on tours organized to some southern regions by an approved travel agency may obtain a visa on arrival for up to 30 days.
Andorra	Visa not required		
Angola	Visa not required	30 days	30 days per trip, but no more than 90 days within any 1 calendar year for tourism purposes only.; Visitors must have a return/onward ticket and a hotel reservation confirmation.; An International Certificate of Vaccination is required.
Antigua and Barbuda	Visa not required	6 months	
Argentina	Visa not required	90 days	
Armenia	eVisa / Visa on arrival	120 days	
Australia and territories	Online Visa required		May apply online (Online Visitor e600 visa).; Fee 195 AUD.; Transit visa is not required.; Exempt for stays of up to 90 days for holders of an APEC Business Travel Card (ABTC) with local pre-clearance.
Austria	Visa not required	90 days	90 days within any 180-day period in the Schengen Area.
Azerbaijan	eVisa	30 days	
Bahamas	Visa not required	3 months	
Bahrain	eVisa / Visa on arrival	14 days	
Bangladesh	Visa required		Visa on arrival available to business travelers if they are holding a letter of invitation issued by an accredited organization in Bangladesh that has notified the Immigration authorities prior to arrival.
Barbados	Visa not required	30 days	
Belarus	Visa not required	30 days	Must arrive and depart via Minsk National Airport.
Belgium	Visa not required	90 days	90 days within any 180-day period in the Schengen Area.
Belize	Visa not required	30 days	
Benin	eVisa	30 days	Must have an international vaccination certificate.; Three types of electronic visa are offered: the e-Visa valid for 30 days for a single entry (50 EUR), the e-Visa valid for 30 days for several (multiple) entries (75 EUR), and the e-Visa valid for 90 days to make several (multiple) entries (100 EUR).
Bhutan	eVisa	90 days	The Sustainable Development Fee (SDF) of 200 USD per person, per night for almost all visitors to Bhutan. Additionally, if payment is made in US dollars from September 1, 2023 to August 31, 2027, the SDF is 100 USD.
Bolivia	Visa not required	180 days	
Bosnia and Herzegovina	Visa not required	90 days	90 days within any 6-month period.
Botswana	Visa not required	90 days	
Brazil	Visa not required	90 days	
Brunei	Visa required		Exempt for stays of up to 90 days for holders of an APEC Business Travel Card (ABTC).
Bulgaria	Visa not required	90 days	90 days within any 180-day period in the Schengen Area.
Burkina Faso	eVisa		
Burundi	Online Visa / Visa on arrival	1 month	
Cambodia	eVisa / Visa on arrival	30 days	Fee 37 USD.
Cameroon	eVisa		
Canada	Visa required		Citizens of Mexico who have held a Canadian visa within the past 10 years or who currently hold a valid non-immigrant U.S. visa can apply for an eTA when arriving by air only (a Canadian visa is required if arriving to Canada via-land from the United States or on a ship).
Cape Verde	Visa required		
Central African Republic	Visa required		
Chad	eVisa		
Chile	Visa not required	90 days	
China	Visa required (conditional); Visa not required		30-day visa-free entry to Hainan Island, if arriving directly on the island from outside Mainland China.; Exempt for business stays of up to 60 days for holders of an APEC Business Travel Card (ABTC).; 240-hour (10-day) visa-free transit to a third country or region (including Hong Kong, Macau or Taiwan) using any mode of transport. Must have a confirmed onward ticket/itinerary, and enter through 1 of 64 approved ports.; During which, may freely travel within the 24 provinces permitted for visa-free transit and engage in tourism, business, and visits.; 24-hour visa-free transit to a third country or region (including Hong Kong, Macau, and Taiwan), is available at most international airports, without leaving the airport.; Travellers who need to leave the airport may obtain a temporary entry permit from immigration.; 5-day port visa (Visa on Arrival) for Shenzhen if arriving at designated ports of entry from Hong Kong by land or sea, for stays within Shenzhen.; 3-day port visa (Visa on Arrival) if arriving in Zhuhai or Xiamen at designated ports of entry, for stays within the respective city.; 15-day visa-free entry for cruise ship passengers in tour groups, if arriving at any cruise port along China's coastline, including but not limited to Tianjin; Dalian; Shanghai; Lianyungang; Wenzhou; Zhoushan; Xiamen; Qingdao; Guangzhou; Shenzhen; Beihai; Haikou; Sanya. May further travel inland to all regions of coastal provinces (and equivalents) and Beijing.; May apply for a port visa (Visa on Arrival) if travelling for an urgent, qualified reason. Prior clearance for port visa is highly recommended or may be denied boarding by airlines.
Colombia	Visa not required	90 days	90 days - extendable up to 180-days stay within a 1-year period.
Comoros	Visa on arrival	45 days	
Republic of the Congo	Visa required		
Democratic Republic of the Congo	eVisa	7 days	
Costa Rica	Visa not required	180 days	
Côte d'Ivoire	eVisa	3 months	e-Visa holders must arrive via Port Bouet Airport.
Croatia	Visa not required	90 days	90 days within any 180-day period in the Schengen Area.
Cuba	eVisa	90 days	
Cyprus	Visa not required	90 days	90 days within any 180-day period.
Czech Republic	Visa not required	90 days	90 days within any 180-day period in the Schengen Area.
Denmark	Visa not required	90 days	90 days within any 180-day period in the Schengen Area.
Djibouti	eVisa	31 days	
Dominica	Visa not required	6 months	
Dominican Republic	Visa not required	90 days	Can be extended up to 120 days with fee.
Ecuador	Visa not required	90 days	
Egypt	eVisa / Visa on arrival	30 days	On-arrival visa costs 25 USD.
El Salvador	Visa not required	6 months	12 USD Tourist Card must be purchased upon arrival.
Equatorial Guinea	eVisa		Must arrive via Malabo International Airport, processing fee 75 USD.
Eritrea	Visa required		
Estonia	Visa not required	90 days	90 days within any 180-day period in the Schengen Area.
Eswatini	Visa required		
Ethiopia	eVisa / Visa on arrival	90 days	Visa on arrival is obtainable only at Addis Ababa Bole International Airport.; e-Visa holders must arrive via Addis Ababa Bole International Airport.; e-Visa is available for 30 or 90 days.
Fiji	Visa not required	4 months	
Finland	Visa not required	90 days	90 days within any 180-day period in the Schengen Area.
France	Visa not required	90 days	90 days within any 180-day period in the Schengen Area.
Gabon	eVisa	90 days	e-Visa holders must arrive via Libreville International Airport.
Gambia	Visa required		
Georgia	Visa not required	1 year	
Germany	Visa not required	90 days	90 days within any 180-day period in the Schengen Area.
Ghana	Visa required		
Greece	Visa not required	90 days	90 days within any 180-day period in the Schengen Area.
Grenada	Visa not required	90 days	
Guatemala	Visa not required	90 days	
Guinea	eVisa	90 days	
Guinea-Bissau	Visa on arrival	90 days	
Guyana	eVisa		Exempt from obtaining a visa for stays of up to 90 days if they hold a valid visa issued by Canada, the United States or a Schengen member state
Haiti	Visa not required	3 months	
Honduras	Visa not required	90 days	
Hungary	Visa not required	90 days	90 days within any 180-day period in the Schengen Area.
Iceland	Visa not required	90 days	90 days within any 180-day period in the Schengen Area.
India	eVisa	30 days	e-Visa holders must arrive via 32 designated airports (Note: Ahmedabad; Amritsar; Bagdogra; Bengaluru; Bhubaneswar; Chandigarh; Chennai; Coimbatore; Delhi; Gaya; Goa-Dabolim; Goa-Manohar; Guwahati; Hyderabad; Indore; Jaipur; Kannur; Kochi; Kolkata; Kozhikode; Lucknow; Madurai; Mangaluru; Mumbai; Nagpur; Port Blair; Pune; Surat; Thiruvananthapuram; Tiruchirappalli; Varanasi; Visakhapatnam) or 5 designated seaports. (Note: Chennai; Cochin; Mormugao (Goa); Mumbai; Mangalore); An Indian e-Tourist Visa may only be obtained twice within 1 calendar year.; Foreigners of Pakistani origin or who hold a Pakistani Passport are not eligible for an e-Visa. Foreigners who are not Pakistani nationals, but whose parents or grandparents (either paternal or maternal) were born in, or were permanent residents in Pakistan, are also not eligible for an e-Visa.; Since 2017 the Indian government has added to the list of e-Visa entry points, totaling 28 airports and 5 seaports.; e-Visa allows for 2 entries during the 6-month issue period.; e-Tourist Visa fee is 10 USD (April to June) or 40 USD (July to March).
Indonesia	e-VOA / Visa on arrival	30 days	Exempt for business stays of up to 60 days for holders of an APEC Business Travel Card (ABTC) with local pre-clearance.
Iran	Visa not required	15 days	Visa or entry may be refused if the passport contains an Israeli stamp or other countries' border crossing points with Israel (see Israeli stamps).; 30 days e-Visa also available.
Iraq	eVisa	30 days	
Ireland	Visa not required	90 days	
Israel	Electronic Travel Authorization	90 days	
Italy	Visa not required	90 days	90 days within any 180-day period in the Schengen Area.
Jamaica	Visa not required	90 days	
Japan	Visa not required	90 days	90 days, extendable up to 180 days.
Jordan	eVisa / Visa on arrival	30 days	Visa can be obtained upon arrival, it will cost a total of 40 JOD, obtainable at most international ports of entry and land border crossings. (except King Hussein/Allenby Bridge)
Kazakhstan	Visa not required	30 days	
Kenya	Electronic Travel Authorisation	90 days	Applications can be submitted up to 90 days prior to travel and must be submitted at least 3 days in advance.; eTA fee is 32.50 USD.; Proof of reservation at the hotel where visitors plan to stay is required (if staying with friends, an invitation letter is also acceptable).; Yellow fever vaccination certificate is required if coming from endemic countries.
Kiribati	Visa not required	90 days	90 days within any 12-month period.
North Korea	Visa required		
South Korea	Electronic Travel Authorization	3 months	The validity period of a K-ETA is 3 years from the date of approval. but is exempted until 31 December 2026.
Kuwait	Visa required		Eligible for an e-Visa if holding a valid residence permit of no less than 6 months in a GCC country.; Visa or entry may be refused if the passport contains an Israeli stamp (see Israeli stamps).
Kyrgyzstan	Visa not required	30 days	30 days within any 60-day period.
Laos	eVisa / Visa on arrival	30 days	18 (Note: Savannakhet Airport; Lanetoui - Mengkang (China); Meuangmom - Wan Pong (Myanmar); Banvang - Ban Khok Phai (Thailand); Namngeun - Huay Kon (Thailand); Paksan - Bueng Kan (Thailand); Paktaphan - Pak Saeng (Thailand); Pangmon - Ban Huak (Thailand); Phoudou (Thailand); Dak ta ock - Nam Giang (Vietnam); La Lai (Vietnam); Namkan (Vietnam); Namphao - Cau Treo (Vietnam); Namsoy - Na Meo (Vietnam); Naphao - Cha Lo (Vietnam); Pahang - Long Sap (Vietnam); Panghok - Tây Trang (Vietnam); Phoukeua - Bo Y (Vietnam)) of the 33 border crossings are only open to regular visa holders.; e-Visa may be used to enter Laos through the Luang Prabang, Pakse and Vientiane international airports, 3 Thai-Lao Friendship Bridges (Note: Vientiane (Friendship Bridge 1); Savannakhet (Friendship Bridge 2); Bokeo (Friendship Bridge 4)), in Boten (road and railroad), and in Vientiane (at Khamsavath railway station).; Visa on arrival is available at the Luang Prabang, Pakse and Vientiane international airports, 4 Thai-Lao Friendship Bridges (Note: Vientiane (Friendship Bridge 1); Savannakhet (Friendship Bridge 2); Khammouane (Friendship Bridge 3); Bokeo (Friendship Bridge 4)) and 7 border crossings. (Note: Nongnokkheane - Trapeang Kriel (Cambodia); Boten - Bo han (China); Golden Triangle/Samliemkham (Thailand); Khamsavath railway station (Thailand); Namheuang - Ban Na Kraseng (Thailand); Vang tao - Chongmek (Thailand); Dansavan - Lao Bảo (Vietnam))
Latvia	Visa not required	90 days	90 days within any 180-day period in the Schengen Area.
Lebanon	Free visa on arrival	1 month	Extendable for 2 additional months; granted free of charge at Beirut International Airport or any other port of entry if there is no Israeli visa or seal, holding a telephone number, an address in Lebanon, and a non refundable return or circle trip ticket.
Lesotho	eVisa		
Liberia	e-VOA	3 months	
Libya	eVisa		Visa or entry may be refused if the passport contains an Israeli stamp or visa (see Israeli stamps).
Liechtenstein	Visa not required	90 days	90 days within any 180-day period in the Schengen Area.
Lithuania	Visa not required	90 days	90 days within any 180-day period in the Schengen Area.
Luxembourg	Visa not required	90 days	90 days within any 180-day period in the Schengen Area.
Madagascar	eVisa / Visa on arrival	90 days	For stays of 61 to 90 days, the visa fee is 59 USD.
Malawi	eVisa / Visa on arrival	90 days	
Malaysia	Visa not required	30 days	Up to 90 days for holders of an APEC Business Travel Card (ABTC) with local pre-clearance.
Maldives	Free visa on arrival	30 days	
Mali	Visa required		
Malta	Visa not required	90 days	90 days within any 180-day period in the Schengen Area.
Marshall Islands	Visa on arrival	90 days	
Mauritania	eVisa	30 days	
Mauritius	Visa not required	180 days	180 days per calendar year for tourism, 120 days per calendar for business
Micronesia	Visa not required	30 days	
Moldova	Visa not required	90 days	90 days within any 180-day period.
Monaco	Visa not required	90 days	
Mongolia	eVisa	30 days	
Montenegro	Visa not required	90 days	
Morocco	Visa not required	3 months	
Mozambique	eVisa / Visa on arrival	30 days	
Myanmar	eVisa	28 days	e-Visa holders must arrive via Yangon, Nay Pyi Taw or Mandalay airports or via land border crossings with Thailand — Tachileik, Myawaddy and Kawthaung or India — Rih Khaw Dar and Tamu.; e-Visa is available for tourism only.
Namibia	eVisa / Visa on arrival	3 months / 90 days	Visa on arrival is available at the following locations: Hosea Kutako International Airport; Impalila Island; Katima Mulilo; Ngoma; Trans Kalahari (Buitepos); Walvis Bay Airport
Nauru	Visa required		
Nepal	Online Visa / Visa on arrival	90 days	
Netherlands	Visa not required	90 days	90 days within any 180-day period in the Schengen Area.
New Zealand	Electronic Travel Authority	3 months	International Visitor Conservation and Tourism Levy must be paid upon requesting an Electronic Travel Authority.; Holders of an Australian Permanent Resident Visa or Resident Return Visa may be granted a New Zealand Resident Visa on arrival permitting indefinite stay (pursuant to the Trans-Tasman Travel Arrangement), subject to meeting character requirements and obtaining an Electronic Travel Authority prior to departure. Such travelers are not required to pay the International Visitor Conservation and Tourism Levy.
Nicaragua	Visa required		
Niger	Visa required		
Nigeria	eVisa	30 days	
North Macedonia	Visa not required	90 days	
Norway	Visa not required	90 days	90 days within any 180-day period in the Schengen Area.
Oman	Visa required		Eligible for 30 days e-Visa if holding a valid Schengen visa, or a valid visa or residence permit from Australia, Canada, UK or USA.
Pakistan	eVisa	3 months	
Palau	Free visa on arrival	30 days	
Panama	Visa not required	90 days	
Papua New Guinea	Easy Visitor Permit	60 days	Exempt for stays of up to 60 days for holders of an APEC Business Travel Card (ABTC) with local pre-clearance.
Paraguay	Visa not required	90 days	
Peru	Visa not required	183 days	
Philippines	Visa not required	30 days	Up to 60 days for holders of an APEC Business Travel Card (ABTC) with local pre-clearance.
Poland	Visa not required	90 days	90 days within any 180-day period in the Schengen Area.
Portugal	Visa not required	90 days	90 days within any 180-day period in the Schengen Area.
Qatar	Visa not required	30 days	
Romania	Visa not required	90 days	90 days within any 180-day period in the Schengen Area.
Russia	eVisa	30 days	Up to 6 months with a hotel booking confirmation ("touristic voucher").; Exempt for stays of up to 90 days for holders of a non-virtual APEC Business Travel Card (ABTC) with local pre-clearance.
Rwanda	eVisa / Visa on arrival	30 days	
Saint Kitts and Nevis	Visa not required	3 months	
Saint Lucia	Visa not required	6 weeks	
Saint Vincent and the Grenadines	Visa not required	3 months	
Samoa	Entry permit on arrival	90 days	
San Marino	Visa not required	90 days	
São Tomé and Príncipe	eVisa		
Saudi Arabia	Visa required		Visa or entry may be refused if the passport contains an Israeli stamp, visa or if the holder also has Israeli citizenship (see Israeli stamps).; Eligible for an e-Visa, visa on arrival or transit visa if holding a valid Schengen, USA or UK visa (used at last once) or a permanent residence visa in the European Union, UK or USA.; Eligible for an e-Visa or transit visa if holding a valid residence permit of no less than 3 months in a GCC country.
Senegal	Visa required		
Serbia	Visa not required	90 days	
Seychelles	Electronic Border System	3 months	Application can be submitted up to 30 days before travel.; Visitors must upload a reservation confirmation(s) for each visitor's location of stay in Seychelles.; Yellow fever vaccination certificate is required if coming from endemic countries.; Payment of the fee (EUR 10) by credit or debit card.; Valid for one journey only and it expires once exit the country.
Sierra Leone	eVisa	3 months	
Singapore	Visa not required	30 days	Up to 60 days for holders of an APEC Business Travel Card (ABTC) with local pre-clearance.
Slovakia	Visa not required	90 days	90 days within any 180-day period in the Schengen Area.
Slovenia	Visa not required	90 days	90 days within any 180-day period in the Schengen Area.
Solomon Islands	Visa required		
Somalia	eVisa	30 days	
South Africa	Electronic Travel Authorization / eVisa	90 days	Mexican passport holders may apply for instant South African electronic travel authorisation (ETA), provided the entry is via O.R. Tambo International Airport, Cape Town International Airport or Lanseria International Airport.; ETA is valid for 1 year, multi-entry, with each stay up to 90 days.; ETA issuance is usually within an hour.; In addition to ETA, e-Visa is also available.
South Sudan	eVisa		Obtainable online 30 days single entry for 100 USD, 90 days multiple entry for 200 USD and 180 days multiple entry for 350 USD.; Printed visa authorization must be presented at the time of travel.
Spain	Visa not required	90 days	90 days within any 180-day period in the Schengen Area.
Sri Lanka	ETA / Visa on arrival	30 days	
Sudan	Visa required		
Suriname	Visa not required	90 days	An entrance fee of USD 50 or EUR 50 must be paid online prior to arrival.; Multiple entry e-Visa is also available.
Sweden	Visa not required	90 days	90 days within any 180-day period in the Schengen Area.
Switzerland	Visa not required	90 days	90 days within any 180-day period in the Schengen Area.
Syria	eVisa		Visa or entry may be refused if the passport contains an Israeli stamp.
Tajikistan	Visa not required / eVisa	30 days / 60 days	e-Visa also available.; e-Visa holders can enter through all border points.
Tanzania	eVisa / Visa on arrival	90 days	
Thailand	Visa not required	60 days	Exempt for stays of up to 90 days for holders of an APEC Business Travel Card (ABTC) with local pre-clearance.
Timor-Leste	Visa on arrival	30 days	
Togo	eVisa	15 days	
Tonga	Visa required		
Trinidad and Tobago	Visa not required	90 days	
Tunisia	Visa not required	90 days	
Turkey	Free eVisa	30 days	Mandatory travel insurance costs 12 USD (VAT included) to receive free e-Visa.
Turkmenistan	Visa required		10-day visa on arrival if holding a letter of invitation provided by a company registered in Turkmenistan with a prior approval from the Foreign Ministry. Visitors can apply to extend their stay for an additional 10 days.; When transiting between two non-bordering countries, visitors can obtain a Turkmenistan transit visa for a five-day stay. This must be applied for in advance at the Turkmenistan Embassy. Visitors must also submit copies of the visas for the country of entry into Turkmenistan and the country of departure from Turkmenistan. Visa fee is 20 USD.
Tuvalu	Visa on arrival	1 month	
Uganda	eVisa	3 months	Visa fee is 50 USD.
Ukraine	eVisa	30 days	
United Arab Emirates	Visa not required	180 days	
United Kingdom and Crown dependencies	Electronic Travel Authorisation	6 months	ETA UK will be valid for 2 years.
United States	Visa required		Visa not required for government officials not permanently assigned to the United States and their accompanying family members, holding diplomatic or official passports, for stays of up to 6 months.; Visa not required for members of the Kickapoo Native American tribes of Texas and Oklahoma for stays of up 6 months, provided they hold an I-872 form or an American Indian Card.; Visa not required for crew members of Mexican airlines operating in the United States.; Other nationals of Mexico may travel to the United States with a Border Crossing Card, which functions as a visa and has similar requirements.
Uruguay	Visa not required	3 months	
Uzbekistan	Visa not required	30 days	
Vanuatu	Visa not required	120 days	
Vatican City	Visa not required		
Venezuela	Visa not required	90 days	
Vietnam	eVisa		e-Visa is valid for 90 days and multiple entry.; Exempt for business stays of up to 90 days for holders of an APEC Business Travel Card (ABTC) with local pre-clearance.; 30 days visa free when visiting Phu Quoc Island.
Yemen	Visa required		Visa or entry may be refused if the passport contains an Israeli stamp or if the holder was born in Israel (see Israeli stamps).; Yemen introduced an e-Visa system for visitors who meet certain eligibility requirements (group travel of 10 or more people, business trips, and transit etc.).
Zambia	eVisa / Visa on arrival	90 days	
Zimbabwe	eVisa / Visa on arrival	1 month	

=== Dependent, disputed, or restricted territories ===
==== Unrecognized or partially recognized countries ====
Territory	Conditions of access	Notes
Abkhazia	Visa required	Tourists from all countries (except Georgia) can visit Abkhazia for a period not exceeding 24 hours as part of an organized tourist group.
Kosovo	Visa not required	90 days
Northern Cyprus	Visa not required	90 days
Palestine	Visa not required	Arrival by sea to Gaza Strip not allowed.
Sahrawi Arab Democratic Republic		Undefined visa regime in the Western Sahara controlled territory.
Somaliland	Visa required	
South Ossetia	Visa required	To enter South Ossetia, visitors must have a multiple-entry visa for Russia and register their stay with the Migration Service of the Ministry of Internal Affairs within 3 days.
Taiwan	Visa required	Exempt for stays of up to 90 days for holders of an APEC Business Travel Card (ABTC) with local pre-clearance.
Transnistria	Visa not required	Registration required after 24 hours.

==== Dependent and autonomous territories ====
Territory	Conditions of access	Notes
Hong Kong	Visa not required	90 days
Macau	Visa not required	90 days
Denmark
Faroe Islands	Visa not required	
Greenland	Visa not required	
France
Clipperton Island	Special permit required	
French Guiana	Visa not required	Visa free for 3 months within any 6-month period for each territory.
French Polynesia	Visa not required	Visa free for 3 months within any 6-month period for each territory.
Guadeloupe	Visa not required	Visa free for 3 months within any 6-month period for each territory.
Martinique	Visa not required	Visa free for 3 months within any 6-month period for each territory.
Saint Barthélemy	Visa not required	Visa free for 3 months within any 6-month period for each territory.
Saint Martin	Visa not required	Visa free for 3 months within any 6-month period for each territory.
Mayotte	Visa not required	Visa free for 3 months within any 6-month period for each territory.
New Caledonia	Visa not required	Visa free for 3 months within any 6-month period for each territory.
Réunion	Visa not required	Visa free for 3 months within any 6-month period for each territory.
Saint Pierre and Miquelon	Visa not required	Visa free for 3 months within any 6-month period for each territory.
Wallis and Futuna	Visa not required	Visa free for 3 months within any 6-month period for each territory.
Netherlands
Aruba	Visa not required	Up to 90 days for each territory.
Bonaire	Visa not required	Up to 90 days for each territory.
Sint Eustatius	Visa not required	Up to 90 days for each territory.
Saba	Visa not required	Up to 90 days for each territory.
Curaçao	Visa not required	Up to 90 days for each territory.
Sint Maarten	Visa not required	Up to 90 days for each territory.
New Zealand
Cook Islands	Visa not required	31 days
Niue	Visa not required	30 days
Tokelau	Permit required	
Norway
(Norway) Jan Mayen	Permit required	Permit issued by the local police required for staying for less than 24 hours and permit issued by the Norwegian police for staying for more than 24 hours.
(Norway) Svalbard	Visa not required	Unlimited period under Svalbard Treaty but it's practically impossible to board a flight/ferry to Svalbard without entering Norway. Hence double entry Schengen visa would be required to go and come back from Svalbard to mainland Norway.
United Kingdom
Akrotiri and Dhekelia	Visa not required	
Anguilla	Visa not required	3 months
Bermuda	Visa not required	Up to 6 months, decided on arrival.
British Indian Ocean Territory	Special permit required	
British Virgin Islands	Visa not required	Up to 6 months.
Cayman Islands	Visa not required	6 months
Falkland Islands (Malvinas)	Visa not required	A visitor permit is normally issued as a stamp in the passport on arrival, The maximum validity period is 1 month.
Gibraltar	Visa not required	
Montserrat	Visa not required	6 months
Pitcairn Islands	Visa not required	14 days visa free and landing fee 35 USD or tax of 5 USD if not going ashore.
Saint Helena	eVisa	
Ascension Island	eVisa	3 months within any year period.
Tristan da Cunha	Permission required	Permission to land required for 15/30 pounds sterling (yacht/ship passenger) for Tristan da Cunha Island or 20 pounds sterling for Gough Island, Inaccessible Island or Nightingale Islands.
South Georgia and the South Sandwich Islands	Permit required	Pre-arrival permit from the Commissioner required (72 hours/1 month for 110/160 pounds sterling).
Turks and Caicos Islands	Visa not required	90 days
United States
American Samoa	Entry permit required	
Guam	Visa required	
Northern Mariana Islands	Visa required	
Puerto Rico	Visa required	
U.S. Virgin Islands	Visa required	
Antarctica and adjacent islands
Special permits required for Bouvet Island, British Antarctic Territory, French Southern and Antarctic Lands, Argentine Antarctica, (Australia) Australian Antarctic Territory, (Antártica Chilena Province) Chilean Antarctic Territory, (Australia) Heard Island and McDonald Islands, (Norway) Peter I Island, (Norway) Queen Maud Land, (New Zealand) Ross Dependency.

==== Other territories ====
- Australia. Ashmore and Cartier Islands - Special authorisation required.
- Belarus. Brest and Grodno - Visa not required for 10 days.
- China. Hainan - Visa not required for 30 days.
- China. Tibet Autonomous Region - Tibet Travel Permit required (10 USD).
- Colombia. San Andrés and Leticia - Visitors arriving at Gustavo Rojas Pinilla International Airport and Alfredo Vásquez Cobo International Airport must buy tourist cards on arrival.
- Ecuador. Galápagos - 60 days; Visitors must pre-register to receive a 20 USD Transit Control Card (TCT).
- Eritrea outside Asmara – To travel in the rest of the country, a Travel Permit for Foreigners is required (20 Eritrean nakfa).
- Fiji. Lau Province - Special permission required.
- Greece Mount Athos - Special permit required (4 days: 25 euro for Orthodox visitors, 35 euro for non-Orthodox visitors, 18 euro for students). There is a visitors' quota: maximum 100 Orthodox and 10 non-Orthodox per day and women are not allowed.
- India. Protected Area Permit (PAP) required for whole states of Nagaland and Sikkim and parts of states Manipur, Arunachal Pradesh, Uttaranchal, Jammu and Kashmir, Rajasthan, Himachal Pradesh. Restricted Area Permit (RAP) required for all of Andaman and Nicobar Islands and parts of Sikkim. Some of these requirements are occasionally lifted for a year.
- Iran. Kish Island - Visa not required.
- Kazakhstan. Closed cities - Special permission required for the town of Baikonur and surrounding areas in Kyzylorda Oblast, and the town of Gvardeyskiy near Almaty.
- North Korea outside Pyongyang - Special permit required. People are not allowed to leave the capital city, tourists can only leave the capital with a governmental tourist guide (no independent moving).
- Malaysia. Sabah and Sarawak - Visa not required. These states have their own immigration authorities and passport is required to travel to them, however the same visa applies.
- Maldives outside Malé - Permission required. Tourists are generally prohibited from visiting non-resort islands without the express permission of the Government of Maldives.
- Russia. Several closed cities and regions in Russia - Special authorization required.
- Saudi Arabia Mecca and Medina - Special access required. Non-Muslims and those following the Ahmadiyya religious movement are strictly prohibited from entry.
- Sudan. Darfur - Separate travel permit is required.
- Sudan outside Khartoum - All foreigners traveling more than 25 kilometers outside of Khartoum must obtain a travel permit.
- Tajikistan. Gorno-Badakhshan Autonomous Province - OIVR permit required (15+5 Tajikistani Somoni) and another special permit (free of charge) is required for Lake Sarez.
- Turkmenistan. Closed cities - A special permit, issued prior to arrival by Ministry of Foreign Affairs, is required if visiting the following places: Atamurat, Cheleken, Dashoguz, Serakhs and Serhetabat.
- United States. Closed city of Mercury, Nevada, United States - Special authorization is required for entry into Mercury.
- United States. United States Minor Outlying Islands - Special permits required for Baker Island, Howland Island, Jarvis Island, Johnston Atoll, Kingman Reef, Midway Atoll, Palmyra Atoll and Wake Island.
- Venezuela. Margarita Island - Visa not required. All visitors are fingerprinted.
- Vietnam. Phú Quốc - Visa not required for 30 days.
- Yemen outside Sana'a or Aden - Special permission needed for travel outside Sana'a or Aden.
- (United Nations) UN Buffer Zone in Cyprus - Access Permit is required for travelling inside the zone, except Civil Use Areas.
- (United Nations) Korean Demilitarized Zone - Restricted area.
- (United Nations) UNDOF Zone and Ghajar - Restricted area.

== APEC Business Travel Card ==
Full members of the scheme Transitional members (United States, Canada)

Holders of an APEC Business Travel Card (ABTC) travelling on business do not require a visa to the following countries:

- Australia^{1}
- Brunei^{1}
- Chile^{1}
- China^{3}
- Hong Kong^{3}
- Indonesia^{3}
- Japan^{1}
- Malaysia^{1}
- New Zealand^{1}
- Papua New Guinea^{3}
- Peru^{1}
- Philippines^{3}
- Russia^{2}
- Singapore^{3}
- South Korea^{1}
- Taiwan^{1}
- Thailand^{1}
- Vietnam^{3}

_{1 - Up to 90 days}
_{2 - Up to 90 days in a period of 180 days}
_{3 - Up to 60 days}

The card must be used in conjunction with a passport and has the following advantages:

- No need to apply for a visa or entry permit to APEC countries, as the card is treated as such (except by Canada and United States)
- Undertake legitimate business in participating economies
- Expedited border crossing in all member economies, including transitional members

== Non-visa restrictions ==
=== Blank passport pages ===
Many countries require a minimum number of blank pages to be available in the passport being presented, typically one or two pages. Endorsement pages, which often appear after the visa pages, are not counted as being valid or available.

=== Vaccination ===
Cover of the new International Certificate of Vaccination issued by the Bureau of Quarantine in the Philippines since 2021

The African countries of Angola, Benin, Burkina Faso, Burundi, Cameroon, Central African Republic, Democratic Republic of the Congo, Republic of the Congo, Côte d'Ivoire, Gabon, Ghana, Guinea-Bissau, Mali, Niger, Sierra Leone and Togo, South Sudan and Uganda, along with French Guiana in South America, require all incoming passengers older than nine months to one year, to have a current International Certificate of Vaccination or Prophylaxis.

Some other countries require vaccination only if the passenger is coming from an infected area or has visited one recently or has transited for 12 hours in those countries: Algeria, Botswana, Cabo Verde, Chad, Djibouti, Egypt, Eswatini, Ethiopia, Gambia, Ghana, Guinea, Lesotho, Libya, Equatorial Guinea, Eritrea, Madagascar, Malawi, Mauritania, Mauritius, Mozambique, Namibia, Nigeria, Papua New Guinea, Seychelles, Somalia, South Africa, Sudan, Tunisia, Uganda, Tanzania, Zambia and Zimbabwe.

=== Passport validity length ===
Very few countries, such as Paraguay, just require a valid passport on arrival.

However many countries and groupings now require only an identity card – especially from their neighbours. Other countries may have special bilateral arrangements that depart from the generality of their passport validity length policies to shorten the period of passport validity required for each other's citizens or even accept passports that have already expired (but not been cancelled).

Some countries, such as Japan, Ireland and the United Kingdom, require a passport valid throughout the period of the intended stay.

In the absence of specific bilateral agreements, countries requiring passports to be valid for at least 6 more months on arrival include Afghanistan, Algeria, Anguilla, Bahrain, Bhutan, Botswana, British Virgin Islands, Brunei, Cambodia, Cameroon, Cape Verde, Cayman Islands, Central African Republic, Chad, Comoros, Costa Rica, Côte d'Ivoire, Curaçao, Ecuador, Egypt, El Salvador, Equatorial Guinea, Fiji, Gabon, Guinea Bissau, Guyana, Haiti, India, Indonesia, Iran, Iraq, Israel, Jordan, Kenya, Kiribati, Kuwait, Laos, Madagascar, Malaysia, Marshall Islands, Mongolia, Myanmar, Namibia, Nepal, Nicaragua, Nigeria, Oman, Palau, Papua New Guinea, Peru, Philippines, Qatar, Rwanda, Samoa, Saudi Arabia, Singapore, Solomon Islands, Somalia, Sri Lanka, Sudan, Suriname, Tanzania, Thailand, Timor-Leste, Tokelau, Tonga, Turkey, Tuvalu, Uganda, United Arab Emirates, Vanuatu, Venezuela, and Vietnam.

Countries requiring passports valid for at least 4 months on arrival include Micronesia and Zambia.

Countries requiring passports with a validity of at least 3 months beyond the date of intended departure include Azerbaijan, Bosnia and Herzegovina, Honduras, Montenegro, Nauru, Moldova and New Zealand. Similarly, the EEA countries of Iceland, Liechtenstein, Norway, all European Union countries (except Ireland) together with Switzerland also require 3 months validity beyond the date of the bearer's intended departure unless the bearer is an EEA or Swiss national.

Countries requiring passports valid for at least 3 months on arrival include Albania, North Macedonia, Panama, and Senegal.

Bermuda requires passports to be valid for at least 45 days upon entry.

Countries that require a passport validity of at least one month beyond the date of intended departure include Eritrea, Hong Kong, Lebanon, Macau, the Maldives and South Africa.

==== Maximum passport age ====
Countries of the Schengen area require non-EU passports to be less than 10 years old upon entry.

=== Criminal record ===
Some countries, including Australia, Canada, Fiji, New Zealand and the United States, routinely deny entry to non-citizens who have a criminal record, while others impose restrictions depending on the type of conviction and the length of the sentence.

=== Persona non grata ===
The government of a country can declare a diplomat persona non grata, banning them from entering the country or expelling them if they have already entered. In non-diplomatic use, the authorities of a country may also declare a foreigner persona non grata permanently or temporarily, usually because of unlawful activity.

=== Israeli stamps ===
Kuwait, Lebanon, Libya, and Yemen do not allow entry to people with passport stamps from Israel or whose passports have either a used or an unused Israeli visa, or where there is evidence of previous travel to Israel such as entry or exit stamps from neighbouring border posts in transit countries such as Jordan and Egypt.

To circumvent this Arab League boycott of Israel, the Israeli immigration services have now mostly ceased to stamp foreign nationals' passports on either entry to or exit from Israel (unless the entry is for some work-related purposes). Since 15 January 2013, Israel no longer stamps foreign passports at Ben Gurion Airport. Passports are still (as of 22 June 2017) stamped at Erez when passing into and out of Gaza.

Iran refuses admission to holders of passports containing an Israeli visa or stamp that is less than 12 months old.

=== Biometrics ===
Several countries mandate that all travellers, or all foreign travellers, be fingerprinted on arrival and will refuse admission to or even arrest travellers who refuse to comply. In some countries, such as the United States, this may apply even to transit passengers who merely wish to change planes rather than go landside.

Fingerprinting countries/regions include Afghanistan, Argentina, Brunei, Cambodia, China, Ethiopia, Ghana, Guinea, India, Japan, Kenya (both fingerprints and a photo are taken), Malaysia upon entry and departure, Mongolia, Saudi Arabia, the Schengen Area, Singapore, South Korea, Taiwan, Thailand, Uganda, the United Arab Emirates and the United States.

Many countries also require a photo be taken of people entering the country. The United States, which does not fully implement exit control formalities at its land frontiers (although long mandated by its own legislation), intends to implement facial recognition for passengers departing from international airports to identify people who overstay their visa.

Together with fingerprint and face recognition, iris scanning is one of three biometric identification technologies internationally standardised since 2006 by the International Civil Aviation Organization (ICAO) for use in e-passports and the United Arab Emirates conducts iris scanning on visitors who need to apply for a visa. The United States Department of Homeland Security has announced plans to greatly increase the biometric data it collects at US borders. In 2018, Singapore began trials of iris scanning at three land and maritime immigration checkpoints.

== See also ==
- Visa policy of Mexico
- Mexican passport
