= Cédula diplomática mexicana =

Identity card issued to Mexican diplomats

Mexican Diplomatic Identity card
- Type: Identity card
- Issued by: Mexico
- First issued: January 2016 (Most recent edition)
- Purpose: Identification of diplomatic officers
- Eligibility: Diplomatic officers and family

Mexican diplomatic identity cards are issued to diplomatic officers and family for the purpose of traveling abroad when not in official duties. The Mexican diplomatic identity card is also an official identification and proof of Mexican citizenship.

== Physical appearance ==
Mexican diplomatic identity cards are white plastified cards bearing the coat of arms of Mexico, the seal of the ministry of foreign affairs, and the words "Estados Unidos Mexicanos" (United Mexican States) above the coat of arms.

=== Identity information page ===
Cards currently issued include the following data:

- Photograph
- Type (D)
- Country code (MEX)
- ID card number
- Surname(s)
- Given name(s)
- Appointment
- Observation(s)
- Date of birth
- Personal ID number (CURP)
- Sex
- Place of birth
- Date of issue
- Authority
- Date of expiration
- Hologram picture in the center-right

=== Languages ===
The textual portions of the Mexican diplomatic ID cards are printed in Spanish, English and French.

== Urban legend ==
There was an urban legend circulating online that Mexican people could not enter Ecuador, with or without such a card, but Reuters exposed that as false.
