= Visa policy of Mexico =

Policy on permits required to enter Mexico

Visitors to Mexico must obtain a visa unless they are citizens from one of the visa-exempt countries or citizens eligible for the Electronic Authorization System (SAE).

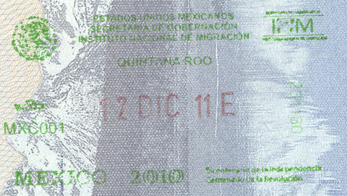
Entry stamp issued at a border crossing

Visas are issued by the National Institute of Migration, dependent on the Secretariat of the Interior, with the stated goal of regulating and facilitating migratory flows into the country.

== Visa policy map ==
Visa policy of Mexico Mexico Visa not required (180 days) Electronic Travel Authorization (SAE) eVisa Visa not required (180 days) if holding a valid Canadian, Japanese, Schengen, UK or US multiple-entry visa, or a permanent residence permit issued by any Schengen Area member state, Canada, Chile, Colombia, Japan, the UK or the US; otherwise, visa required

== Visa exemption ==
=== Ordinary passports ===
Citizens of the following countries and territories may enter Mexico without a visa for tourist, business, correspondence, study or medical purposes for up to 180 days:

- All European Union member states
- All European Free Trade Association member states
- Andorra
- Argentina
- Australia
- Bahamas
- Barbados
- Belize
- Bolivia
- Canada
- Chile
- Colombia
- Costa Rica
- Hong Kong
- Israel
- Jamaica
- Japan
- Macau
- Malaysia
- Marshall Islands
- Micronesia
- Monaco
- New Zealand
- Palau
- Panama
- Paraguay
- San Marino
- Singapore
- South Korea
- Trinidad and Tobago
- United Arab Emirates
- United Kingdom (Note: Including all types of British passports.)
- United States
- Uruguay

Date of visa changes
- 15 April 1958: Belgium
- 1959: France
- 14 May 1968: Jamaica
- 10 April 1972: Japan
- 9 August 1972: Greece
- 5 April 1979: South Korea
- 14 May 1997: Hungary
- 1 December 2008: Barbados
- 9 November 2012: Colombia
- 31 October 2018: United Arab Emirates
- 24 May 2021: Bolivia

Cancelled:

- 4 September 2021: Ecuador
- 22 January 2022: Venezuela
- 18 August 2022: Brazil
- 20 April 2024: Peru

==== Electronic Authorization System (SAE) ====
The Electronic Authorization System (Sistema de Autorización Electrónica, SAE) is an online system which allows citizens of the following countries to obtain an electronic authorization to travel to Mexico by air without a visa. The authorization is free of charge, valid for 30 days and a single entry. Upon arrival, visitors are authorized to stay in Mexico for tourist, business or transit purposes for up to 180 days. SAE does not apply to travelers entering Mexico by land or sea, or those who are travelling on a non-participating airline.

- Russia
- Turkey
- Ukraine

==== Substitute visa ====
Citizens of other countries who would normally require visas may enter Mexico for a maximum stay of 180 days if they are holding a valid multiple-entry visa or permanent residence permit issued by the following countries:

- (European Union) Any Schengen Area member state

- Canada
- Chile^{1}
- Colombia^{1}
- Japan
- United Kingdom
- United States

_{1 - For holders of permanent residence permits only.}

Only visas physically stamped in the passport or permanent residence cards are recognized for substituting Mexican visas. Temporary residence permits on a stand-alone paper or card from any of the above countries, such as a temporary residency card from an EU country, U.S. I-20 or Canadian work permit, are not accepted for this purpose.

==== Cruise ship passengers ====
Cruise ship passengers of any nationality do not need a visa to visit Mexican ports.

==== Crew members ====
Airline and ship crew members holding their respective credentials do not need a visa.

=== Non-ordinary passports ===
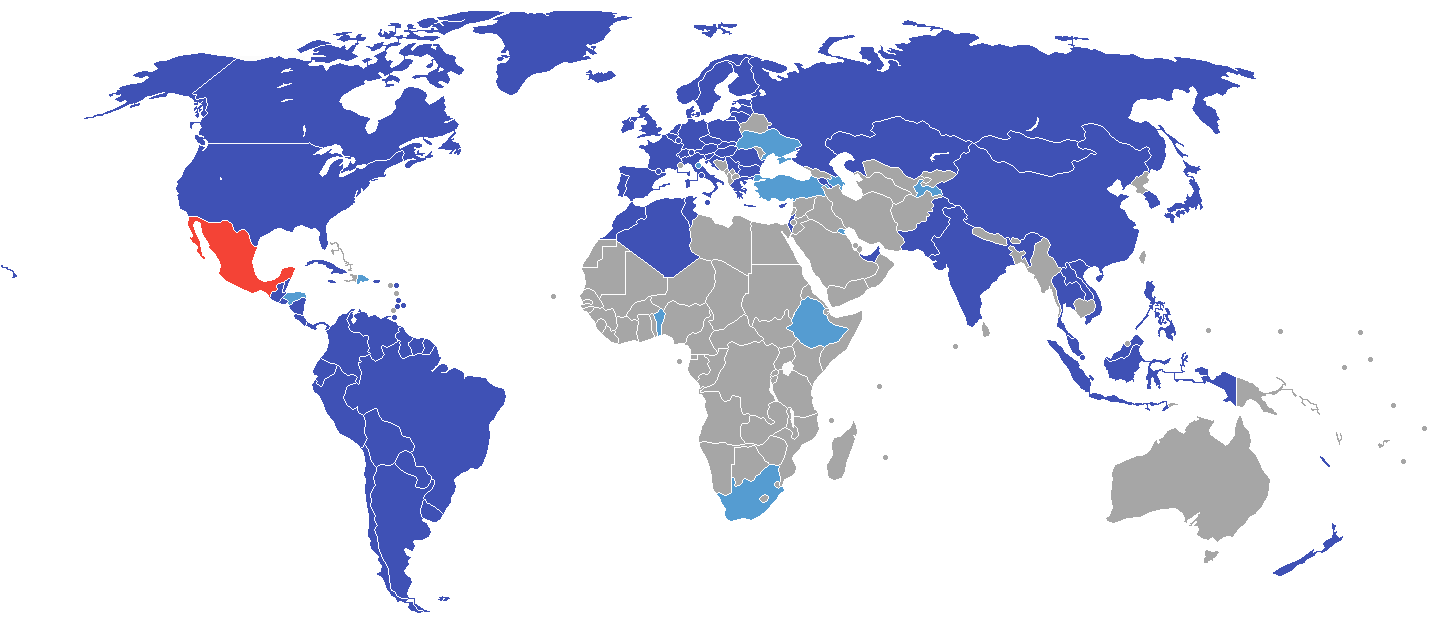
Mexico Visa not required for diplomatic or service category passports Visa not required for diplomatic passports

Holders of diplomatic or various categories of service passports (official, service, special, consular) of visa-exempt countries (listed above, except Australia, Bahamas, Marshall Islands, Micronesia, Monaco, Palau, and only diplomatic passports of San Marino) may enter Mexico without a visa for up to 90 days (180 days for Japan and the United States).

In addition, holders of diplomatic or categories of service passports of Algeria, Antigua and Barbuda, Armenia, Brazil, China, Cuba, Ecuador, El Salvador, Guatemala, Guyana, Holy See, India, Indonesia, Kazakhstan, Laos, Mongolia, Morocco, Nicaragua, Pakistan, Peru, Philippines, Russia, Saint Lucia, Saint Vincent and the Grenadines, Serbia, Suriname, Thailand, Tunisia, Venezuela, Vietnam, and holders of diplomatic passports of Azerbaijan, Benin, Dominican Republic, Ethiopia, Honduras, Kuwait, South Africa, Tajikistan, Turkey and Ukraine may enter Mexico without a visa for up to 90 days (30 days for Indonesia and 3 months for Venezuela).

=== APEC Business Travel Card ===
Holders of passports of the following countries who possess an APEC Business Travel Card (ABTC) containing the code "MEX" on the reverse, indicating that it is valid for Mexico, may travel to Mexico by air without a visa for business trips for up to 180 days.

ABTCs are issued to citizens of:

- Australia
- Brunei
- Chile
- China
- Hong Kong
- Indonesia
- Japan
- South Korea
- Malaysia
- New Zealand
- Papua New Guinea
- Peru
- Philippines
- Russia
- Singapore
- Taiwan
- Thailand
- Vietnam

== Electronic visa (e-Visa) ==
Citizens of the following countries may apply for an e-Visa to travel to Mexico by air for tourist, business or transit purposes. An e-Visa costs of USD 10, valid for 180 days and allows for a single entry.

- Brazil

== Transit ==
From 22 October 2023, the Mexican visa requirement also applies for transit. All foreign nationals who need a visa to enter Mexico also need one even if only transiting a Mexican airport.

== Immigration form ==
All visitors entering Mexico must obtain a Multiple Immigration Form (Forma Migratoria Múltiple, FMM) to present at checkpoints within the country. As of 2026, the FMM has a fee of 983 MXN, about 57 USD. For visitors arriving by commercial flight, the airline includes the fee in the ticket and provides the form to the passenger. Visitors arriving by other means must obtain the form online or on arrival.

== Treatment of Colombians ==
In October 2019, a 17-year old autistic child was selected to join a drawing competition in Mexico City, and arriving into Mexico he was interviewed by some people who, according to the minor, yelled at him and told him that he was not welcome in their country. They took away his cell phone, his drawing book and put him in a room that the minor described as a prison. Another traveler interviewed by Colombian newspaper Semana described arriving into Mexico like "landing in hell".

In 2019, 5,935 Colombians were not allowed to enter Mexican territory, while in 2020 with Colombia being closed for 7 months because of the COVID-19 pandemic, 3,721 Colombians where inadmissible in the remaining 5 months.

In March 2021, the Colombian chancellery spoke about Colombians who claimed to have suffered human rights violations by Mexican immigration authorities, and chancellor Claudia Blum sent a letter to the chancellor of Mexico regarding concerns about the repeated non-admissions of Colombians arriving in Mexico.

== See also ==
- Visa requirements for Mexican citizens
- Foreign relations of Mexico
